= Bardsey Island =

Welsh island

Coordinates: 52.76°N 4.79°W

Bardsey Island: Welsh: Ynys Enlli
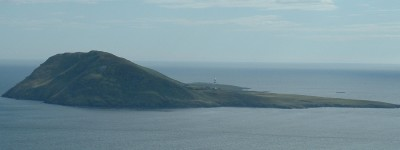
- Bardsey Island seen from Mynydd Mawr

- Location within Gwynedd
- Area: 1.79 km^{2} (0.69 sq mi)
- Population: 3 (as of 2025)
  - Density: 2/km^{2} (5.2/sq mi)
- OS grid reference: SH122218
- Community: Aberdaron
- Principal area: Gwynedd
- Preserved county: Gwynedd
- Country: Wales
- Sovereign state: United Kingdom
- Post town: PWLLHELI
- Postcode district: LL53
- Dialling code: 01758
- Police: North Wales
- Fire: North Wales
- Ambulance: Welsh
- UK Parliament: Dwyfor Meirionnydd
- Senedd Cymru – Welsh Parliament: Dwyfor Meirionnydd

Bardsey Island (Welsh: Ynys Enlli), known as the legendary "Island of 20,000 Saints", is located 1.9 miles (3.1 km) off the Llŷn Peninsula in the Welsh county of Gwynedd. The Welsh name means "The Island in the Currents", while its English name refers to the "Island of the Bards", or possibly the Viking chieftain, "Barda". At 179 hectares (440 acres; 0.69 sq mi) in area it is the fourth largest offshore island in Wales. As of 2025 it had a year-round population of three.

The north east rises steeply from the sea to a height of 548 feet (167 m) at Mynydd Enlli, which is a Marilyn, while the western plain is low and relatively flat cultivated farmland. To the south the island narrows to an isthmus, connecting a peninsula on which the lighthouse stands. Since 1974 it has been included in the community of Aberdaron.

The island has been an important religious site since the 6th century, when it is said that the Welsh king Einion Frenin and Saint Cadfan founded a monastery there. In medieval times it was a major centre of pilgrimage and, by 1212, belonged to the Augustinian Canons Regular. The monastery was dissolved and its buildings demolished by Henry VIII in 1537, but the island remains an attraction for pilgrims, marking the end point of the North Wales Pilgrims Way.

Bardsey Island is famous for its wildlife and rugged scenery. A bird observatory was established in 1953. It is a nesting place for Manx shearwaters and choughs, with rare plants, and habitats undisturbed by modern farming practices. The waters around the island attract dolphins and porpoises and grey seals.

In 2023, the island became the first site in Europe to be awarded International Dark Sky Sanctuary certification.

== Geology ==
1850 Geological map

Like the western and northern parts of nearby Llŷn, the island is formed from rocks of the late Precambrian Gwna Group, itself a part of the Monian Supergroup. The rocks are a mélange, often referred to as the Gwna Mélange, which contain an extraordinary mix of clasts of all sizes up to 100 metres (330 feet) across and of very varied types, including both sedimentary and igneous origin. Blocks of sheared granite within this mélange are visible in the northwestern coastal cliffs of the island. Elsewhere clasts of quartzite, limestone, sandstone, mudstone, jasper and basalt can be found. The deposit is interpreted as an olistostrome, a giant underwater landslide possibly triggered by an earthquake some time after 614 million years ago.

A dolerite dyke of Ordovician age intrudes the melange at Trwyn y Gorlech in the north whilst an olivine dolerite dyke of Tertiary age is seen at Cafn Enlli in the southeast. Further dykes occur in the cliffs at Ogof y Gaseg and at Ogof Hir.

A thin spread of glacial till stretches across the centre of the island, a relict of the late Devensian Irish Sea Icesheet. There is a small patch of blown sand at Porth Solfach on the west coast and a landslip at Briw Cerrig at the foot of the cliffs on the east coast.

== History ==
Map of Bardsey Island

The island was inhabited in Neolithic times, and traces of hut circles remain. During the 5th century, the island became a refuge for persecuted Christians, and a small monastery existed. Around 516, Saint Einion, king of Llyn, invited the Breton Saint Cadfan to move to the island from his first residence in Tywyn. Under Cadfan's guidance, St Mary's Abbey was built. For centuries, the island was important as "the holy place of burial for all the bravest and best in the land".

Bards called it "a direct path to heaven" and "the gates of Paradise", and in medieval times three pilgrimages to Bardsey were considered to be of equivalent benefit to the soul as one to Rome.

In 1188, the abbey was still a local institution but, by 1212, it belonged to the Canons Regular. Many people still walk the journey to Aberdaron and Uwchmynydd each year in the footsteps of the saints, although today only ruins of the old abbey's 13th century bell tower remain. A Celtic cross amidst the ruins commemorates the 20,000 saints reputed to be buried on the island.

Saint Einion is sometimes claimed to have joined the community on the island, although his relics are claimed by Llanengan on the mainland. Saint Deiniol, the Bishop of Bangor, was buried on the island in 584. Saint Dyfrig was also buried on Bardsey Island, although in 1120 his remains were transferred to Llandaff centuries later.

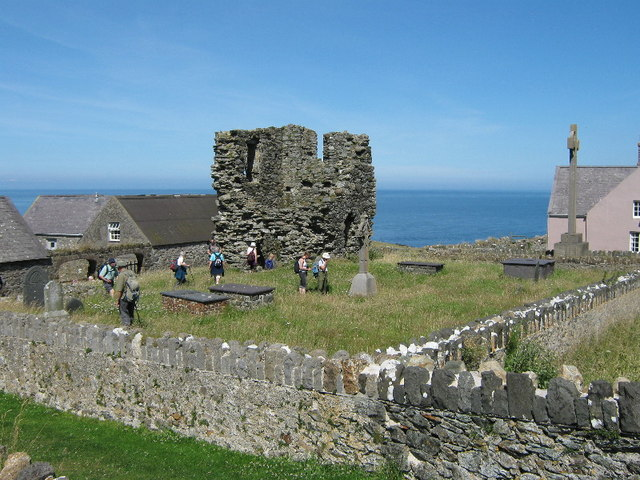
Ruins of St Mary's Abbey

The Suppression of Religious Houses Act 1535, on the orders of Henry VIII, resulted in St Mary's Abbey being dissolved and its buildings demolished in 1537. The choir stalls, two screens and the bells were transferred to Llanengan, where the parish church was then being built.

In the 16th century, Bardsey was owned by Sir John Wynn (an ancestor of the Newborough barons), who was standard bearer to Edward VI at Kett's Rebellion in Norfolk in 1549.

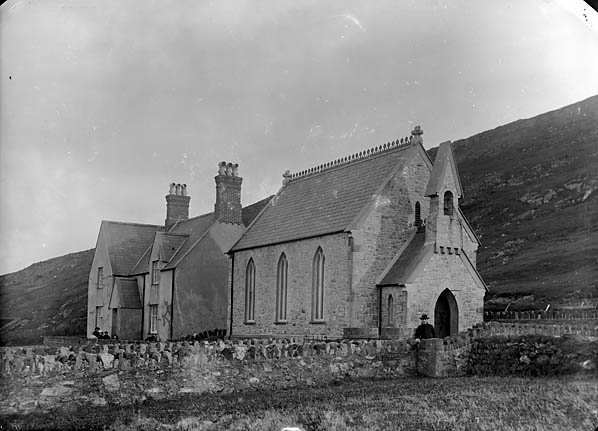
Bardsey Chapel in about 1885

For many years Bardsey Island formed part of the Newborough Estate, and between 1870 and 1875 the island's farms were rebuilt; a small limestone quarry was opened, and a lime kiln constructed. Carreg and Plas Bach are separate buildings, but the remaining eight were built as semi-detached houses, each pair with outbuildings set around a shared yard. The buildings are Grade II listed and, in 2008, Cadw approved a grant of £15,000 to cover the first phase of repairs. Only one of the original croglofft cottages, Carreg Bach, survives. Given the choice of a harbour or a new church, in 1875 the islanders asked the estate to provide a place of worship; a Methodist chapel was built.

The island had a population of 90 by 1841. It had increased to 132 in 1881; by 1961 it had fallen to seventeen. By 2014, the population had dropped to eleven. In 2019 there was still a long-term population of eleven, of whom four lived on the island during the winter. By 2025, the population had dropped to three. The island's small school opened in a former chapel in 1919 and closed in 1953.

The Bardsey Island Trust (Welsh: Ymddiriedolaeth Ynys Enlli) bought the island in 1977, after an appeal set up by the Bardsey Bird and Field Observatory and supported by the Church in Wales and many Welsh academics and public figures. The trust is financed through membership subscriptions, grants and donations, and is dedicated to protecting the wildlife, buildings and archaeological sites of the island; promoting its artistic and cultural life; and encouraging people to visit as a place of natural beauty and pilgrimage.

When, in 2000, the trust advertised for a tenant for the 440 acres (180 ha) sheep farm on the island, they had 1,100 applications. The tenancy was held by the Royal Society for the Protection of Birds; and the land is managed to maintain the natural habitat. Oats, turnips and swedes were grown; goats, ducks, geese and chickens kept; and there is a mixed flock of sheep and Welsh Black cattle. The RSPB pulled out of the agreement when the tenancy ended.

== Bardsey apple ==
A gnarled and twisted apple tree, discovered by Ian Sturrock growing by the side of Plas Bach, is believed to be the only survivor of an orchard that was tended by the monks who lived there a thousand years ago. In 1998, experts on the varieties of British apples at the National Fruit Collection in Brogdale stated that they believed this tree was the only example of a previously unrecorded cultivar, the Bardsey Apple (Welsh: Afal Enlli). The cultivar has since been propagated by grafting and is available commercially. Since its discovery it has led to a resurgence in the discovery and propagation of other Welsh apple varieties.

== Bardsey Lighthouse ==
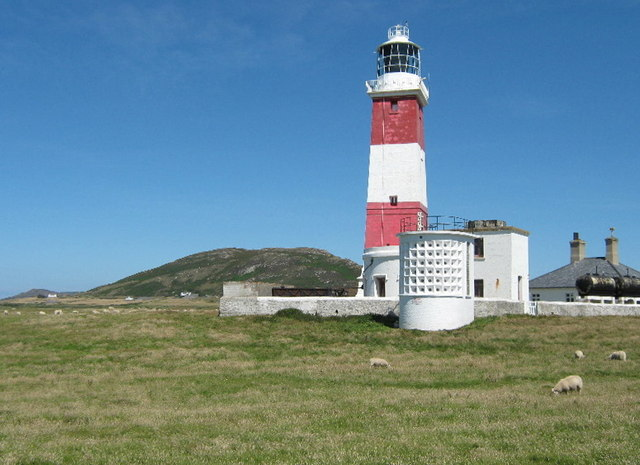
Bardsey Lighthouse

Bardsey Lighthouse stands on the southerly tip of the island and guides vessels passing through St George's Channel and the Irish Sea. It was built in 1821 by Joseph Nelson. Unusually for a British lighthouse, it is square in section and is painted in red and white bands. Y Storws, sometimes referred to as The Boathouse, was built a few years before the lighthouse, near to the landing place at Y Cafn.

== Wildlife ==
The island was declared a National Nature Reserve in 1986, and is part of Glannau Aberdaron ac Ynys Enlli Special Protection Area. It is now a favourite birdwatching location, on the migration routes of thousands of birds. Bardsey Bird and Field Observatory, founded in 1953, The West Midlands Bird club created a bird observatory, and also saw the opportunity to studying the ecology of a small island.

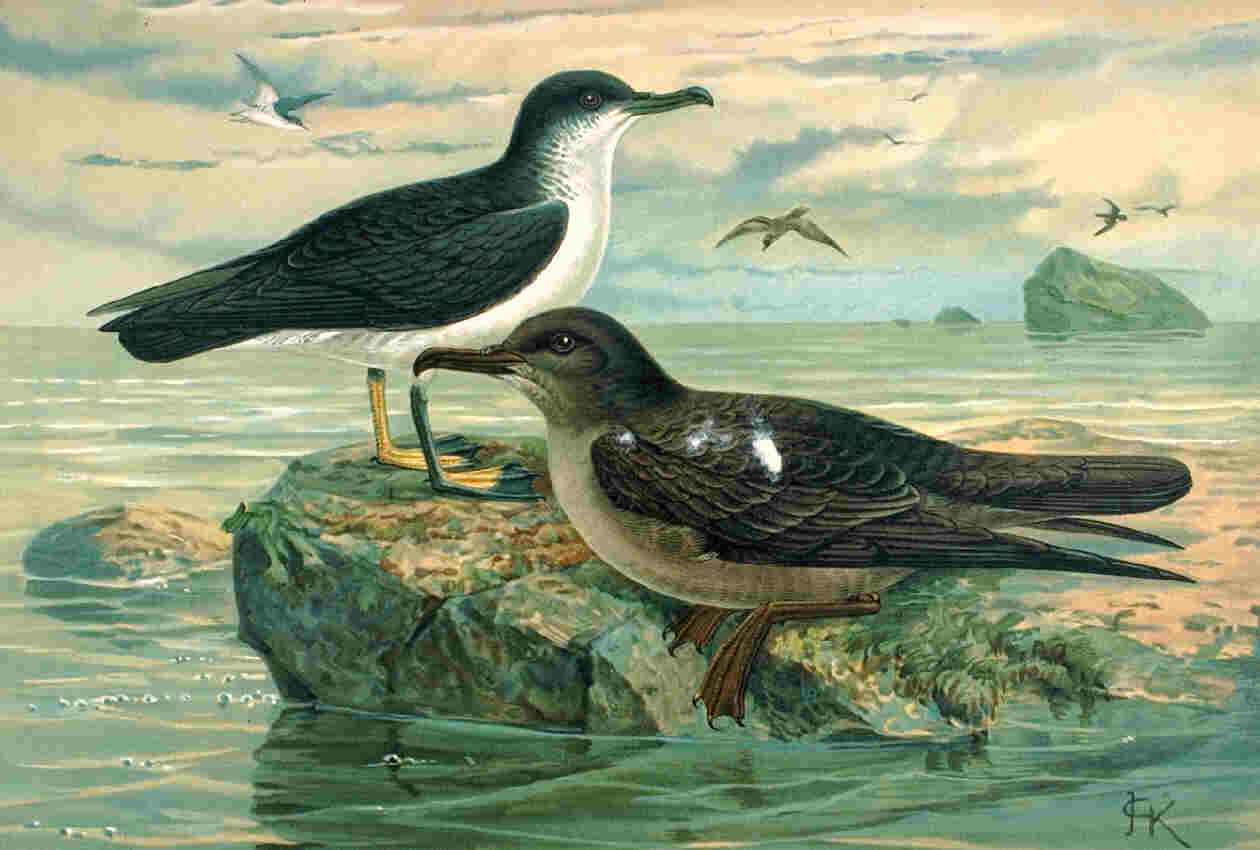
26,000-30,000 pairs of Manx shearwaters come ashore each year, under cover of darkness, to nest on Bardsey Island.

The island was designated a Site of Special Scientific Interest for its maritime communities; internationally rare lichens; bryophyte, vascular plant and bird species; and intertidal communities. Nationally important flowering plants include sharp rush, rock sea lavender, small adder's tongue and western clover, and the rare purple loosestrife is found in places. Two nationally rare heathland lichens are found on the slopes of Mynydd Enlli: the ciliate strap lichen and golden hair lichen; and there are over 350 lichen species in total. The leafcutter bee, named after its habit of cutting neat, rounded circles in rose leaves, used to seal the entrance to its nest, is native.

Thousands of birds pass through each year on their way to their breeding or wintering grounds. Chiffchaffs, goldcrests and wheatears are usually the first to pass through, followed by sedge warblers and willow warblers, whitethroats and spotted flycatchers.

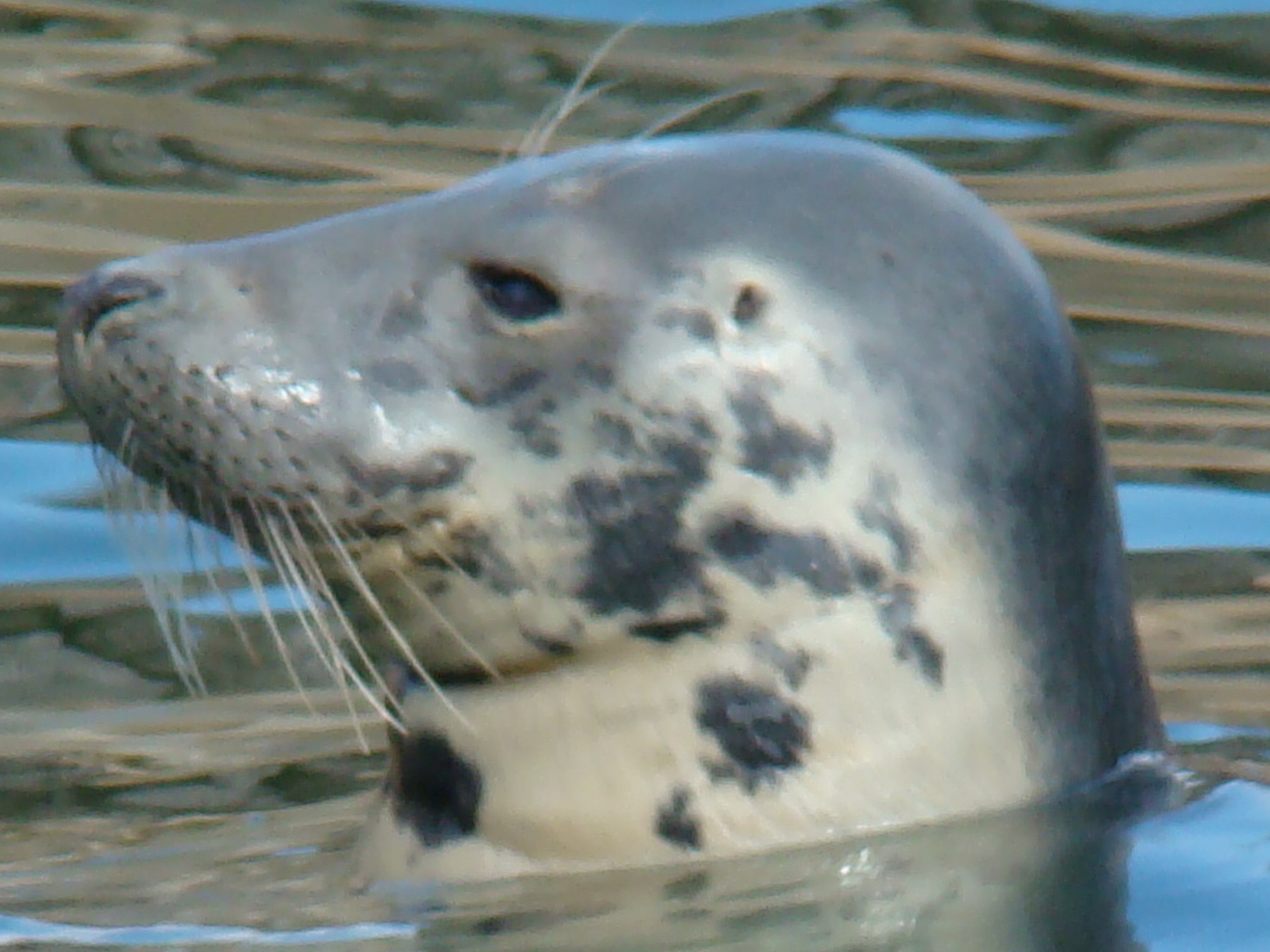
Bardsey Island is one of the best places in Gwynedd to see grey seals. About 25–30 pups are born each autumn

About thirty species of bird regularly nest on the island, including ravens, little owls, oystercatchers and the rare chough. Hundreds of seabirds, including razorbills, guillemots, fulmars and kittiwakes, spend the summer nesting on the island's eastern cliffs, the numbers reflecting the fact that there are no land predators such as rats or foxes to worry about. On a dark moonless night an eerie cackling can be heard across the island as 30,000 pairs of Manx shearwaters, come ashore to lay and incubate their eggs in abandoned rabbit warrens or newly dug burrows.

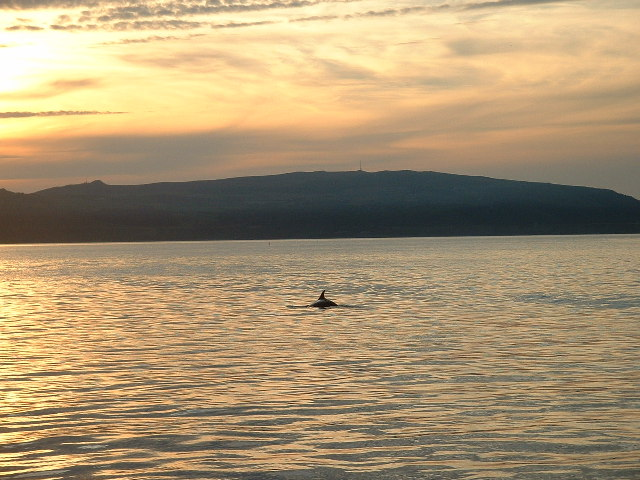
A bottlenose dolphin swimming in sunset in Porth Neigwl (Hell's Mouth) Bay

The island is one of the best places in Gwynedd to see grey seals. In mid-summer over two hundred can be seen, sunbathing on the rocks or bobbing in the sea, and about 60 pups are born each autumn. Their sharp teeth and strong jaws are perfect for breaking the shells of lobsters and crabs which dwell in the waters. It is also possible to spot bottlenose and Risso's dolphins, and porpoises. The currents around the island are responsible for flushing in food-rich waters, and the Whale and Dolphin Conservation Society has been carrying out surveys since 1999 to find out which areas are particularly important for feeding and nursing calves.

The seas around the island are rich in marine life. There are forests of strap seaweed; in the rock pools are sea anemones, crabs and small fish; and in deeper waters, the rocks are covered by sponges and sea squirts. The yellow star anemone, found offshore, is more common to the Mediterranean.

== Culture ==
=== Brenin Enlli ===
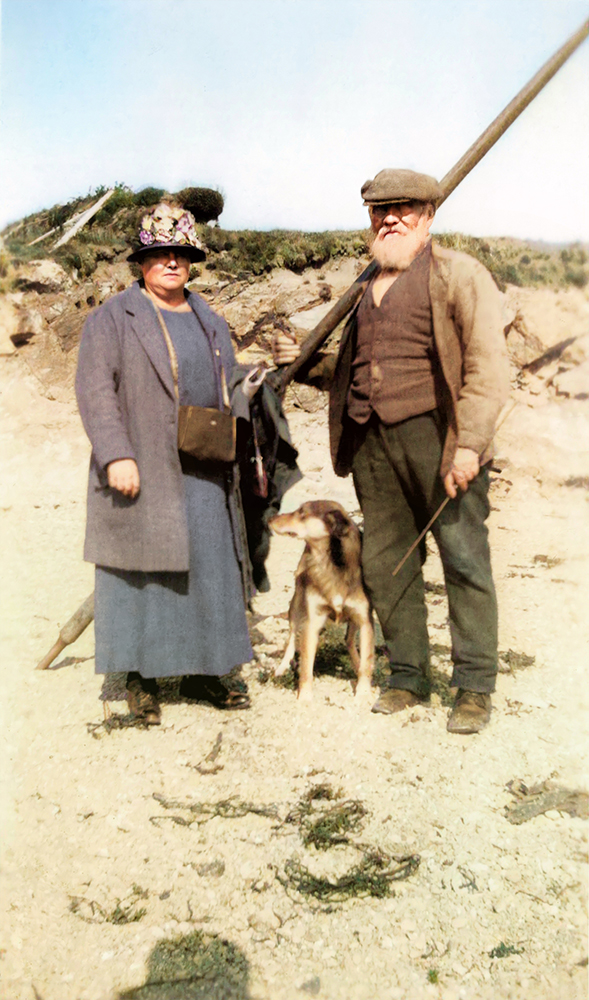
Love Pritchard, Brenin Enlli (Bardsey King) and an unknown woman and a dog, c.1915

It was tradition for the island to elect the "King of Bardsey" (Welsh: Brenin Enlli), and from 1826 onwards, he would be crowned by Baron Newborough or his representative.

In 1925, at the age of 80, Love Pritchard was concerned about the future of the crown, and wanted it to be kept at the National Museum Cardiff in Wales. However, against king Love's wishes, the Wynn family sold the crown to the Merseyside Maritime Museum in Liverpool, England in 1986 where it was stored until 2000, when it was requested by Gwynedd Council to display in a 'special exhibition'; it has since been loaned to Storiel gallery in Bangor.

The first known title holder was John Williams; his son, John Williams II, the third of the recorded kings, was deposed in 1900, and asked to leave the island as he had become an alcoholic. At the outbreak of the First World War, the last king, Love Pritchard, offered himself and the men of Bardsey Island for military service, but he was refused as he was considered too old at the age of 71. Pritchard took umbrage, and declared the island a neutral power. In 1925, Pritchard left the island for the mainland, to seek a less laborious way of life, but died the following year.

=== Notable residents ===
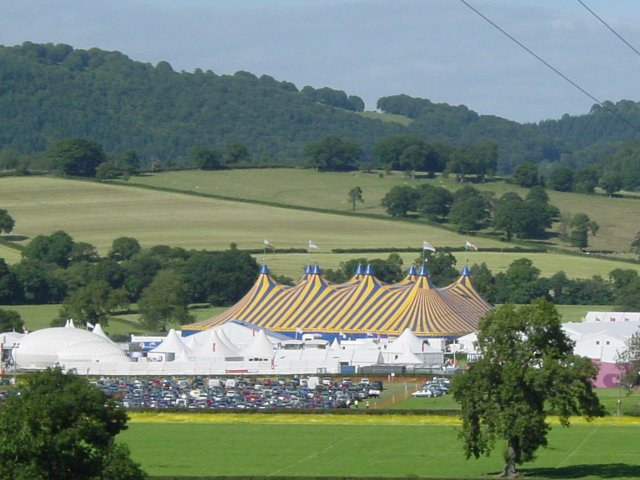
Several artists and writers successful at the National Eisteddfod were inspired by their time on Bardsey Island.

Dilys Cadwaladr, a former schoolteacher on the island, in 1953 became the first woman to win the Crown at the National Eisteddfod, for her long poem Y Llen. Artist Brenda Chamberlain twice won the Gold Medal for Art at the Eisteddfod; in 1951 for Girl with Siamese Cat, and in 1953 with The Christin Children. Some of the murals she painted can still be seen on the walls of Carreg, her home from 1947 to 1962. Wildlife artist Kim Atkinson, whose work has been widely exhibited in Wales and England, spent her childhood on the island and returned to live there in the 1980s.

Yorkshire-born poet Christine Evans lived half of each year on Bardsey Island. She moved to Pwllheli as a teacher, and married into a Bardsey Island farming family. Since 1998 ornithologist Steven Stansfield, has been the Warden and more recently Director of Operations of the Bardsey Bird and Field Observatory.

Since 1999, the Bardsey Island Trust has appointed an 'Artist in Residence' to spend several weeks on the island producing work which is later exhibited on the mainland. A Welsh literary residence was created in 2002; singer-songwriter Fflur Dafydd spent six weeks working on a collection of poetry and prose. Her play Hugo was inspired by her stay, and she has produced two novels, Atyniad (English: Attraction), which won the prose medal at the 2006 Eisteddfod; and Twenty Thousand Saints, winner of the Oxfam Hay Prize, which tells how the women of the island, starved of men, turn to each other.

=== Film ===
- Edgar Ewart Pritchard, an amateur filmmaker from Brownhills, produced The Island in the Current, a colour film of life on Bardsey Island, in 1953. A copy of the film is held by the National Screen and Sound Archive of Wales.

=== Literature ===
James Rollins's sixth Sigma Force novel, The Doomsday Key (2009), refers to Bardsey and its mythology.

Crime writer Mark Billingham set his 2014 novel, The Bones Beneath, on Bardsey. He includes notes on the island at the end of the book, which is one in his series of Tom Thorne novels.

Elizabeth O'Connor's debut novel Whale Fall (2024) is partly inspired by Bardsey Island.

=== Music ===
- Opera singer Bryn Terfel, a patron of the Bardsey Island Trust, has performed in the island's chapel.
- Triple harpist Llio Rhydderch released Enlli (2002), an album inspired by the spiritual emotions evoked on the pilgrimages.

== Transport ==
Passenger ferry services to Bardsey Island are operated from Porth Meudwy and Pwllheli by Bardsey Boat Trips and Enlli Charters. At times, the wind and the fierce sea currents make sailing between the island and the mainland impossible. Sometimes boats are unable to reach or leave Bardsey Island for many days; seventeen visitors were stranded for two weeks in 2000 when gales prevented a boat from going to rescue them.
