= Arthur Gibson =

Arthur Gibson may refer to:

- Arthur Gibson (cricketer, born 1889) (1889–1950), Royal Navy officer and cricketer
- Arthur Gibson (Kent cricketer) (1863–1895), English cricketer
- Arthur Gibson (Lancashire cricketer) (1863–1932), English cricketer
- Arthur Lummis Gibson (1899–1959), English politician and trade unionist
- Arthur Gibson (rugby union) (1844–1927), English rugby union player
- Arthur Gibson (footballer) (1888–1958), active in Spain and France
