= Welsh apples =

The Cambrian Journal (Vol. 111, 1858) contains a list of names for about 200 Welsh apples, the majority of which were from the Monmouth area.

In 1999 a single apple tree was identified by Ian Sturrock on Bardsey Island (located at the end of the Llŷn Peninsula in North Wales). Its uniqueness and the rugged location was seized upon by the media and it was described as "The rarest tree in the world". This media coverage seems to have sparked a resurgence in Welsh apple varieties. The gnarled and twisted tree, growing by the side of Plas Bach, is believed to be the only survivor of an orchard that was tended by the monks who lived there a thousand years ago. In 1998, experts on the varieties of British apples at the National Fruit Collection in Brogdale stated that they believed this tree was the only example of a previously unrecorded cultivar, the Bardsey Apple (Welsh: Afal Enlli). The cultivar has since been propagated by grafting and is available commercially.

The National Botanic Garden of Wales at Llanarthney, Carmarthenshire is planting a Welsh Apple variety collection and hopes to publish a Welsh Pomona in the coming years, with over 50 varieties with Welsh or possible Welsh connections, but not including Foreman's Crew (1826 from Merthyr Tydfil) which remains lost.

Several dozen cultivars are available commercially. There is a Welsh Perry and Cider Society and several commercial orchards growing Welsh varieties, as well as school and community groups with small orchards.

== Lost varieties ==
The list given in the 1858 Cambrian Journal includes the following varieties:

- Afal Basst
- Afal Gwdyr
- Afal Illtud
- Afal Madog
- Blas Y Cwrw
- Cydodyn
- Pippin Bach Llydan
- Pippin Dulas
- Rhobin

There is no further record of any of these cultivars in later documents.

In a two-year study, which involved finding, cataloguing and preserving new apple and pear varieties in Wales, researchers uncovered 73 previously unrecorded varieties of Welsh cider apples and perry pears: These are bringing the total number varieties native to the country to 101. The study has been jointly run by University of South Wales and the Welsh Perry & Cider Society.

== List of current varieties ==
Welsh name	English name	Origin	First Developed	Comment	Season & use
Trwyn Mochyn	Anglesey pig snout	Anglesey	1600s	Large green, tangy	Late cooker
Croen Mochyn	Pig Snout	Anglesey	1850	Brown/gold/red russeted skin, smoky tannic flavour	Mid-Eater
Cox Cymraeg	Welsh cox	Goetre Bach	unknown	Russeted red skin, cox like flavour	Mid-Eater
Pig Aderyn	Bird's beak	St. Dogmaels	Norman era	Juicy green and scarlet stripes with a cider-like tang	Early Eater and Cider
Afal Diamond	Diamond Apple	Dyffryn Ardudwy	1825	Reputedly from the shipwreck of The Diamond. Crimson flush with green. Sweet but with a vinous acidity.	Early eater
-	St. Cecilia	Bassaleg	1900	Shiny red and green, cox like flavour. Heavy cropper. RHS award of merit.	Late Eater
Afal Nant Gwrtheyrn	-	Llŷn peninsula	unknown	A small russet with a fennel like flavour	Mid Season Eater
Afal Enlli	Bardsey Island Apple	Bardsey Island	Discovered 1999	Crunchy, sweet and juicy. Bright carmine red and yellow. Very disease resistant.	early eater
Pig y golomen	Pigeon's beak	Pembroke	Pre 1900	Bright green round cooker	Mid season cooker
Gwell na mill	seek no further	Monmouth	17th century	Nutty and aromatic. Medicinal. Keeps its shape when cooked. Makes a single variety cider.	Mid season triple purpose
Machen	Machen	Caerphilly	19th century	Very large. Bright red.	Mid season cooker and eater
Marged Nicolas	-	Dinefwr	19th century	Large yellow russet	Mid season eater and cider
Brith Mawr	-	Newport	Unknown	Striped yellow and red. Juicy.	Late triple purpose
-	Baker's delicious	South Wales	1920	Original Welsh name lost. Sweet and extremely juicy.	Early eater
Cadwaladr	-	Brecon	Unknown	Bright red. Bittersweet juice.	Mid cider
Gwŷr	Channel Beauty	Swansea	1920	Savoury taste. Crisp and juicy with a cox like aroma.	Early eater
Afal Siampen	Champagne apple	Bont-Newydd	Unknown	Bright red and juicy. Keeps until November. Origins of name unknown.	Early eater
-	Morgan Sweet	South Wales	18th century	A large green/yellow September eating apple. Makes a famous sweet cider. Taken down the pits by coal miners	Early eater and cider
Llwyd Hanner Goch	Leather coat (?)	South Wales	16th Century	A very late russet, complex flavour.	Late eater
-	Monmouth beauty, Tamplin or Cissy	Malpas, Newport	1750	Crimson flushed, rich scent and texture.	Mid season eater
-	Rhyl beauty or Kenneth	Rhyl	1920	A cox seedling	Late eater
Tin yr gwydd	Goose's arse	Dyfed	19th century	Bright green, tangy but needs little added sugar. Named after its shape, not its flavour.	Early cooker
Perthyre	-	Monmouth	Pre 1910	Mild bittersweet juice, cooked fruit have a pear-like flavour.	late cider and cooker
