= Flower of Kent =

Apple cultivar

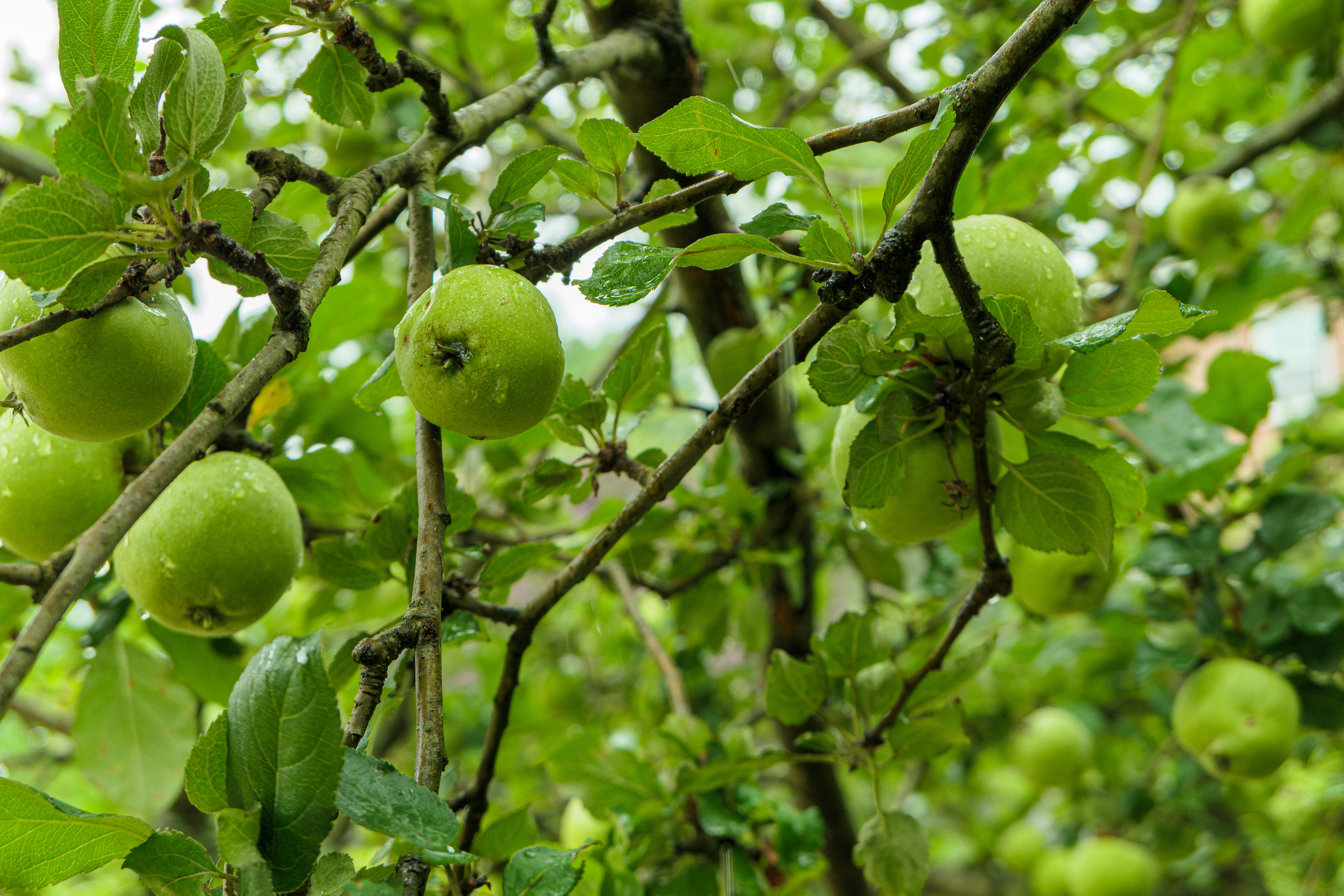
Flower of Kent apples on a tree at Babson College, Massachusetts, descended from the tree which grew in Isaac Newton's garden at Woolsthorpe Manor

The Flower of Kent is a green cultivar of cooking apple. It is pear-shaped, mealy, and sub-acid, and of generally poor quality by today's standards. As its name suggests, this cultivar likely originated from Kent, England.

Though now largely gone from commercial cultivation, a handful of Flower of Kent trees remain. Most, if not all, are said to descend from trees at Newton's Woolsthorpe Manor, and nearly all that exist descend from a single tree in East Malling, Kent. One such tree is located in the President's Garden at the Massachusetts Institute of Technology in the United States, although it is known to have produced only one apple. As of 2026, this cultivar is available at Antique Apple Orchard Inc, Sweet Home, Oregon. The Flower of Kent is also known as the "Gravity Tree" because of its association with Isaac Newton's law of universal gravitation. And as the story goes, Newton saw an apple fall while staying at Woolsthorpe Manor, which was his family's home and his birthplace while waiting out the Great Plague.

Descendants of the original tree are also located in the UK at Trinity College, the Botanic Garden in Cambridge and the University of York & Loughborough University.

Southern England also has a few of the descendant trees located at the National Physical Laboratory in Teddington and the Observatory Science Center in Herstmonceux.

Additional descendants live near Berlin, Germany at Technische Hochschule Wildau. While outside of Europe, 14 of the Flower of Kent's descendants live in the United States, including Brown University, University of Wisconsin, Univeristy of Nebraska, Vanderbilt University, West Virginia University, William & Mary University, Case Western Reserve University, Houghton University, New York Botaniical Gardens, International Park in Washington DC, the National Institue of Standards & Tech and three in Boston. Canada has 3 sites, one of which is at Toronto's York University, and University of Endowment Lands in Vancouver, British Columbia. The tree at York University was planted in 1990 by Bob Prince who was the dean of Science at the time. The first of Canada's trees was thought to be planted in 1950's at Ottawa's National Research Council. There are two in South America in Argentina. One is located at South America, both in Argentina: One is at Centro Atomico Constutuyentes (National Nuclear Research Center) in Buenos Aries and the other is in Bariloche, Rio Negro Province at the Instituto Balseiro. The tree in Africa is located in Babylonstoren in South Africa's Western Cape. Australia also has three. One at Monash University, one at Orange Agricultural Institute in Orange, South Wales and one CSIRO Park Observatory. There is one in Taiwan, at or near Wuling Farm and two in China located at teh Nankai University in Tianjin and the other is in Beijing at the Beijing University.

The Flower of Kent has also received a special recognition in 2002 at Queen Elizabeth II's golden Jubilee, as it was named one the of the 50 great British Trees. And in 2015, seeds from the tree made their way to space, according to the European Space Agency, as part of an experiment during the Principia Mission

According to the story, this is the apple Isaac Newton saw falling to the ground from its tree, inspiring his laws of universal gravitation.

The National Fruit Collection at Brogdale contains an example, listed as "Isaac Newton's Tree" (1948-729).
