= Blue Pearmain =

American apple variety

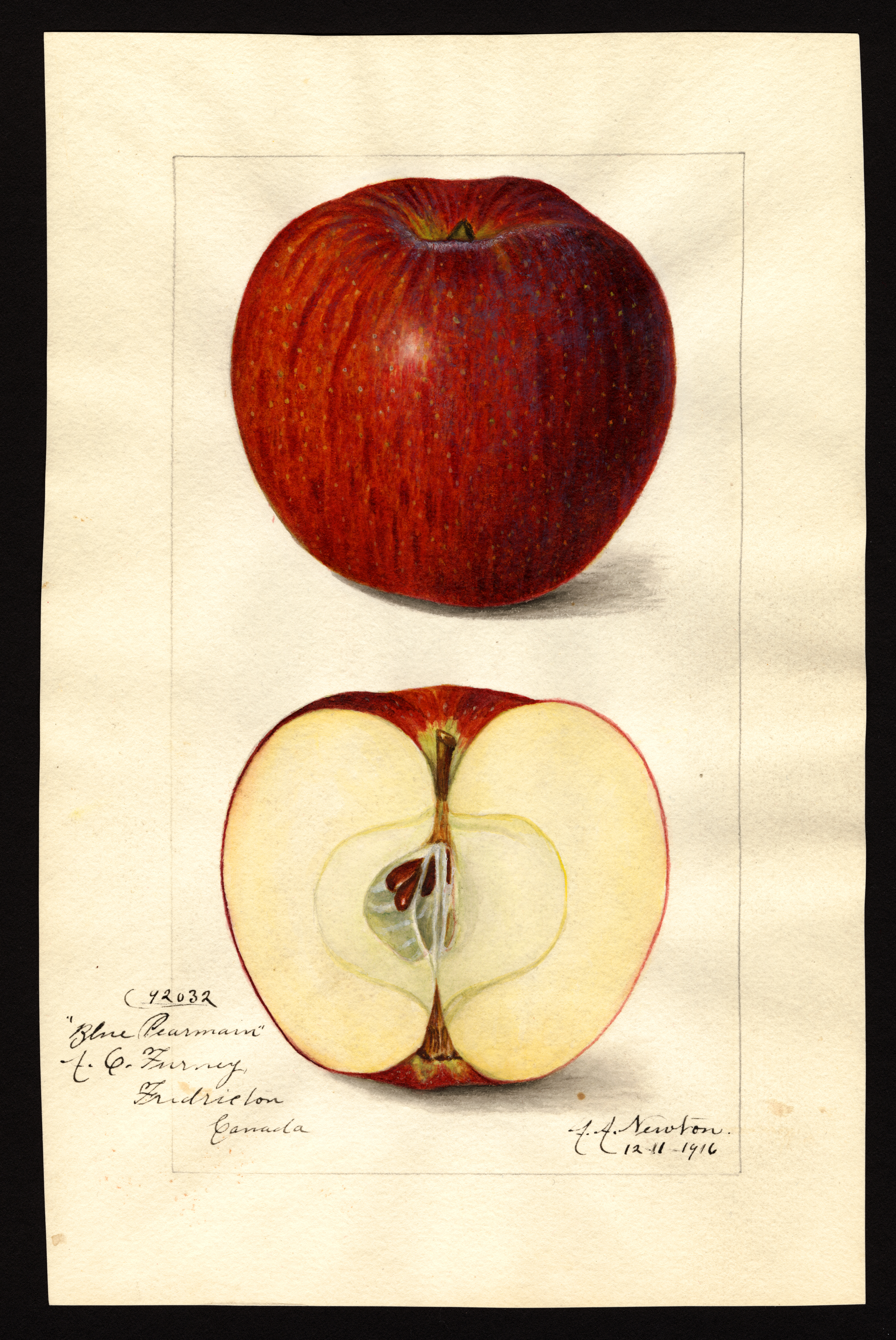
'Blue Pearmain' apple, pictured in 1913

The 'Blue Pearmain' is an American apple variety, mentioned by Henry David Thoreau in his 1862 essay "Wild Apples".

== History ==
The Blue Pearmain's origin is uncertain, but it was known in the US, and widely planted near Boston, in the early 1800s.

Henry David Thoreau describes picking and eating "Blue-Pearmain" apples in his 1862 essay "Wild Apples".

In the late 19th century, the Blue Pearmain won some recognition in England, receiving "an Award of Merit from the Royal Horticultural Society in 1893 and a First Class Certificate in 1896," according to the website of the United Kingdom's National Fruit Collection.

== Characteristics ==
The apple is large, typically round, with a thick red skin stippled with dots and overlaid by the characteristic blue bloom that gives the variety its name. According to Rowan Jacobson in his book Apples of Uncommon Character:

..the look of the Blue Pearmain is half the pleasure. It starts in September as an impressionist’s masterpiece of swirling reds, oranges, and yellows, then, as fall goes by, it deepens into a dark burgundy with blackish streaks and a powdery blue bloom over the surface, as if night was falling and the last colors were draining from the sky.

Jacobson describes the Blue Pearmain's flavor as "all pear and melon and fig, with a touch of hard-charging kiwi brightness to keep things from getting cloying". The apple can be used for fresh eating or for cider or baking. If stored for more than two months, the apples tend to shrivel.
