= Maison Dieu, Faversham =

Historic site in Kent, United Kingdom

Maison Dieu
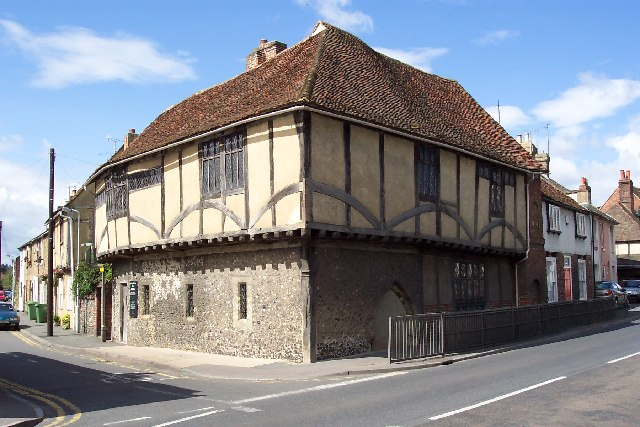
- Maison Dieu

- Maison Dieu location in Kent
- 51.3115°N 0.8735°E
- OS grid reference: TR0036260855

History
- Built: 1234
- Built for: Henry III

Site notes
- Governing body: English Heritage

Listed Building
- Type: Grade II*
- Designated: 29 July 1950
- Reference no.: 1069431

Maison Dieu ('House of God') is a hospital, monastery, hostel, retirement home and royal lodge commissioned by Henry III in 1234. The timber framed building is located beside Watling Street, now the A2 road, in Ospringe, Faversham, in Kent, England.

Edward Hasted noted in 1798 that it was dedicated to the Virgin Mary. The foundation consisted of a master and three regular brethren of the Order of the Holy Cross. There were also two secular clerks, who celebrated mass for the soul of the founder and the souls of his royal predecessors and successors. They were required to be hospitable, and to entertain the poor and needy passers-by and pilgrims (heading along Watling Street). There was a chamber in the building which the king used to rest when he passed this way; it was called Camera Regis, or the king's chamber. The history and records of the building also give insight into the way sick and disabled people fitted into society during the medieval period. For example, in 1235 the 'blind daughter of Andrew of Faversham' was admitted to Maison Dieu as a 'servant of God and sister of the hospital'.

== Timeline ==
Date	Event
1234	Commissioned by Henry III
1240	King Henry III granted to the master and brethren of the Maison Dieu the privilege of a market and a fair to be held in this parish of Headcorn. The fair used formerly to be held on St. Peter's Day, 29 June. But it had been for some years past, held on 12 June.
1245	Robert de Bathel, the abbot of St Augustine's Abbey in Canterbury, granted the right of burial to the brethren of this hospital, wearing the habit, and to the diseased who happened to die here, but to none else.
1314	Nicholas de Staple (the master), left the hospital after an argument with the other brethren, and went to the hospital of St. John the Baptist, Oxford. The brethren of the Oxford hospital sent a brother to Ospringe in his place. In 1334, he returned to Ospringe.
1360	Upon his journey to the port of Dover to return to France at the end of his captivity, King John II of France stopped at the hospital, which then had a royal lodge, and stayed.
1384	On a taxation, the revenues of the hospital were valued at the church of Headcorn, at 20 marks, that is £13 6s 8d.
28 September 1511	Archbishop Warham made a visit to the hospital.
November 1518	The last brethren of the Order of the Holy Cross died, supposedly of the plague, which scared away others from the place. Afterwards the hospital became secular. The estate then passed to St John's College, Cambridge. The contents were given to the abbots of St Augustine's Abbey. The building then became a public house.
1573	The building was leased to Robert Transham (a friend of Thomas Arden (from the 1592 play Arden of Faversham)). He also rebuilt the Parsonage (also leased from St John's College), using materials from the Maison Dieu chapel. Robert was later buried in Ospringe Parish Church.
1925	The building became England's earliest village museum. Water Lane beside Maison Dieu still flooded every winter until 1965, when the stream was diverted by a culvert during the building of the M2 motorway.
1950	The building became a Grade II* listed building.

== Currently ==
It is under the guardianship of English Heritage and managed by the Maison Dieu Museum Trust. Currently it is used to display Roman artefacts from the surrounding area including the ruined 'Church of Our Lady of Elwarton' in Stone. but is only open at weekends and Bank Holidays from Good Friday to October.

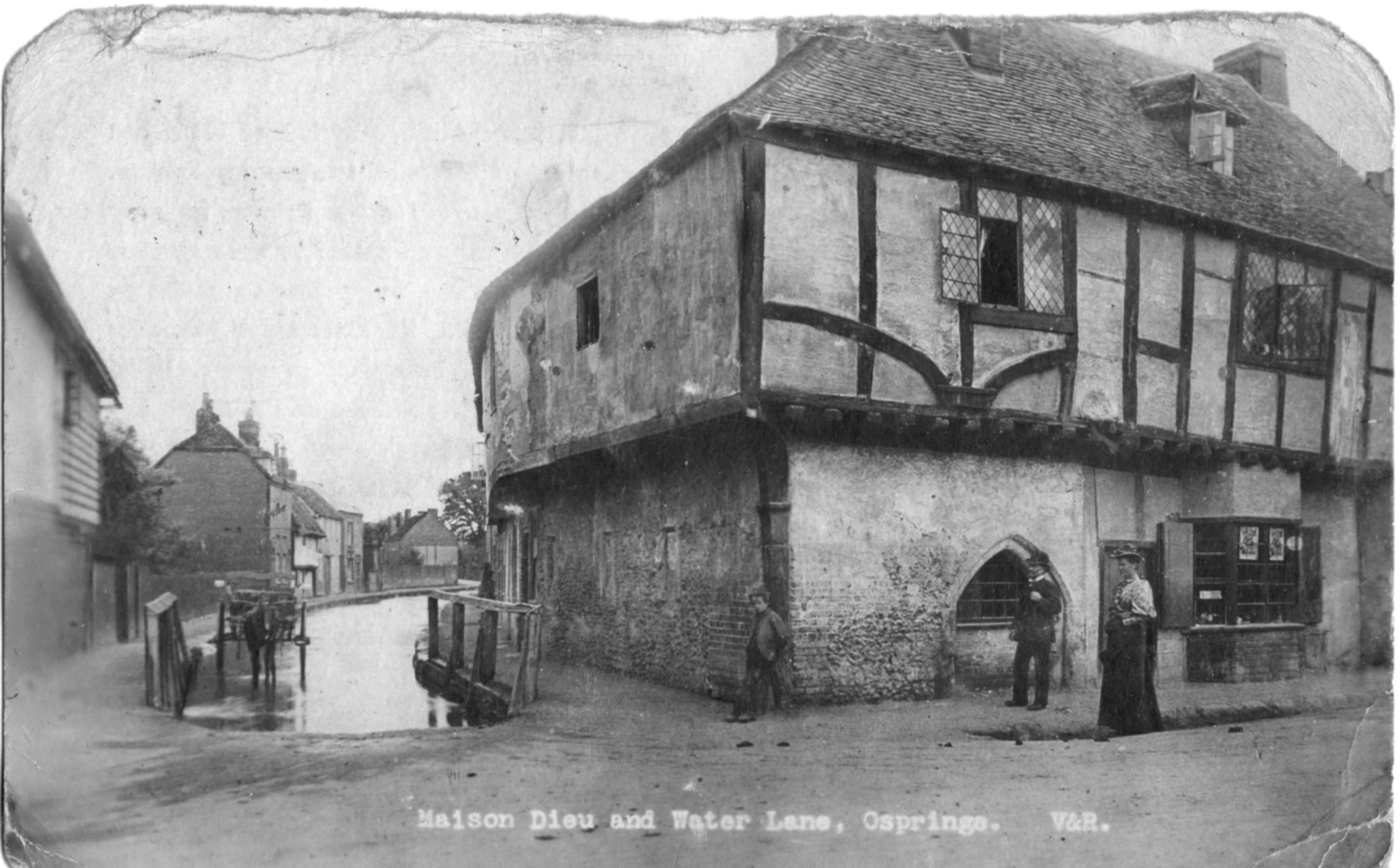
Maison Dieu taken in 1890s

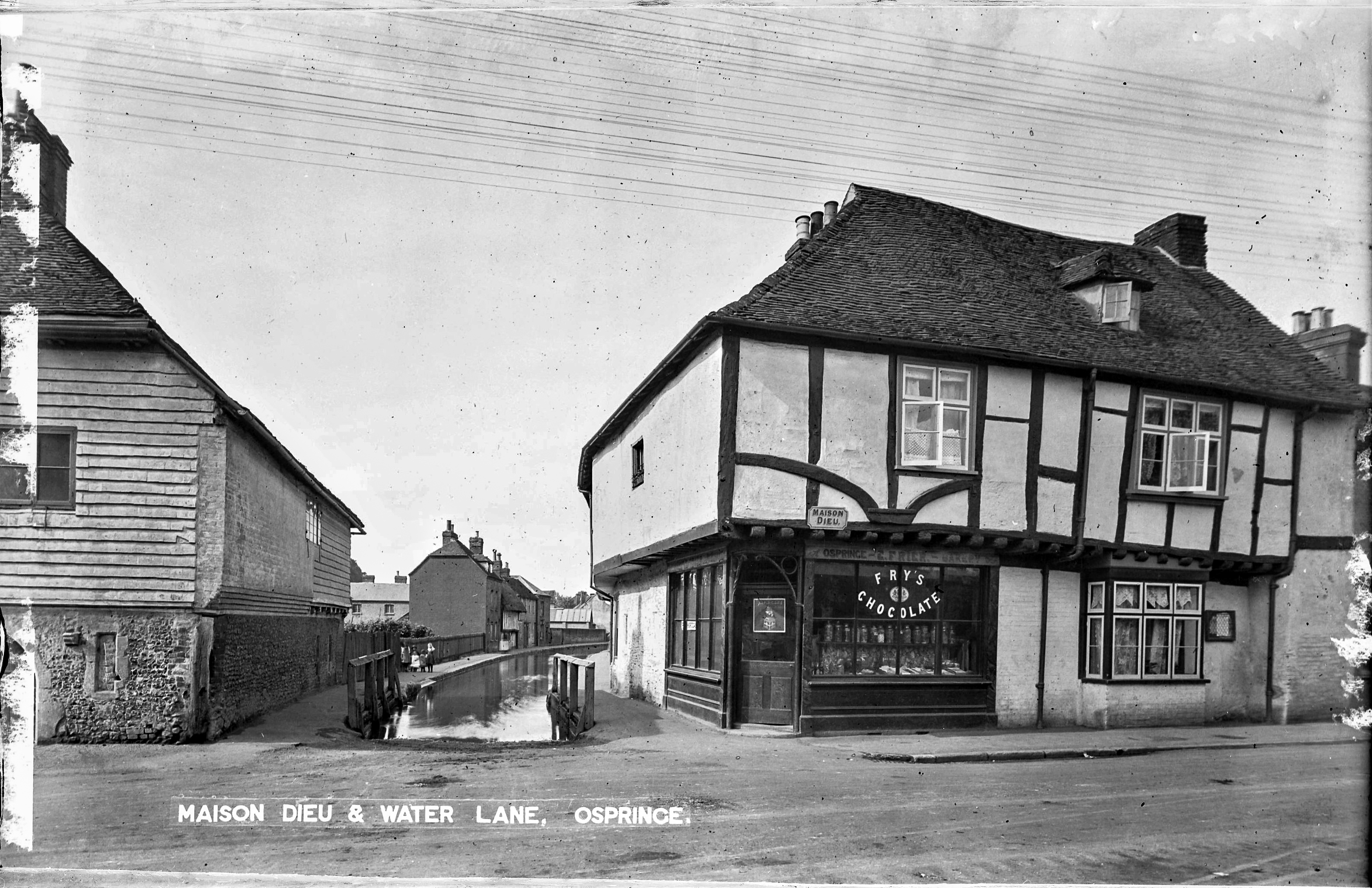
Image of Maison Dieu taken in 1900

== Historic images of the Maison Dieu ==
The Faversham Society have many historic images of the Maison Dieu as part of their archives. In the image from the 1890s the original building can be seen. In 1900 the lower portion of the building was converted into a shop. Original images can be seen in the Faversham Society Museum Archive.
