= Ospringe =

Village in Kent, England

Coordinates: 51.311°N 0.873°E

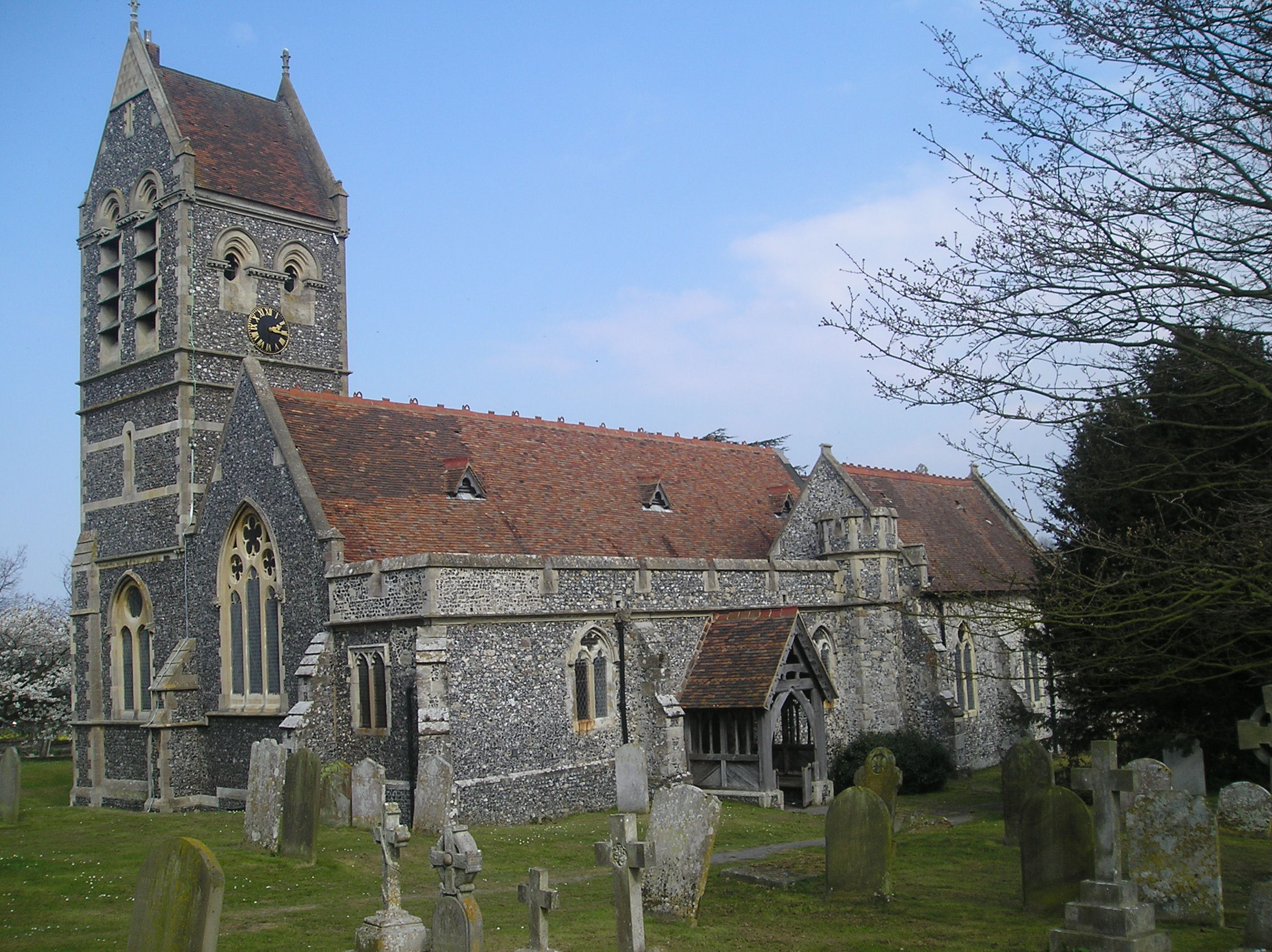
- Church of St Peter and St Paul, Ospringe

- Location within Kent
- Population: 715 (Civil parish only, 2011)
- OS grid reference: TR001604
- Civil parish: Faversham and Ospringe
- District: Swale
- Shire county: Kent
- Region: South East
- Country: England
- Sovereign state: United Kingdom
- Post town: FAVERSHAM
- Postcode district: ME13
- Dialling code: 01795
- Police: Kent
- Fire: Kent
- Ambulance: South East Coast
- UK Parliament: Faversham and Mid Kent

Ospringe is a village and area of Faversham in the English county of Kent. It is also the name of a civil parish, which since 1935 has not included the village of Ospringe.

The village lies on the Roman road Watling Street (nowadays the A2 road), called Ospringe Street in the village. The historic Maison Dieu is on Ospringe Street. The remains of substantial Roman buildings have been found to its north west; the ruins of the abandoned Stone Chapel lie nearby.

The largest settlement in the civil parish of Ospringe is now Painters Forstal, which lies a mile south west of the village of Ospringe. The civil parish also includes the hamlets of Brogdale and Whitehill. The civil parish had a population of 715 in 2001, increasing to 771 at the 2011 census.

The parish church of St Paul and St Peter, a Grade II* listed building, lies half a mile south of the village of Ospringe and within the civil parish. It was built in the early 1200s. The church is in the diocese of Canterbury, and the deanery of Ospringe.

== History ==
The Roman ruins are believed to be on the site of the Durolevum mentioned in the Antonine Itinerary, although this remains uncertain.

In 1798, Edward Hasted records that the village was once called "Ospringes", and that this name comes from the spring or stream that rises in the village and used to lead to Davington pond.

The village was once separate from the hundred of Faversham, and had its own constable. In 1935 part of the parish (including the village and Ospringe Street) became part of the Borough of Faversham. This enabled electricity to be installed in many of the properties. Other parish matters (such as rubbish collection) were now controlled by Faversham, removing the need to dispose of waste in a local disused quarry.

The stream that gave the village its name ran from Whitehill, near Painters Forstal (or Painter's Forstal) northwards along a valley (along Water Lane), towards Ospringe Church and then past Queen Court (a former mansion house – now a Grade II* listed farmhouse,). The stream then passed through a corn grinding water mill (demolished around 1960) and then actually flowed along Water Lane, with raised pavements either side, creating a ford close to the junction with Ospringe Street (A2) (beside the Maison Dieu) It was then culverted under the A2 to reappear on the north side and head towards Chart Gunpowder Mill, before finally running into Faversham creek near Oare. When the M2 motorway was built in 1965, Water Lane was rebuilt south of the A2 and the stream completely diverted into a culvert under the road. This led to the complete disappearance of the ford and stream. The raised pavements were eventually levelled.

According to the Domesday Book of 1086, the village belonged to Odo, Earl of Kent, (as the Bishop of Bayeux). After Odo's trial for fraud, the village then passed back to the Crown as part of the royal demesnes. King John stayed in the manor of Ospringe in October 1214 and in October 1215 (during the First Barons' War). Richard de Marisco, Lord Chancellor of England, came to Ospringe to deliver the Great seal to King John. It then passed to Hubert de Burgh, 1st Earl of Kent but then returned to the King in 1235. In 1299, Queen Margaret became the owner. The manor of Ospringe then became Queen-Court.

Later, two manors split. Sir John Pulteney became the owner of the manor of Ospringe. He was Lord Mayor of London (1330–1331 and 1333) and also owner of Penshurst Place. When he died in 1350, it passed to his son William de Pulteney. When Sir William Pulteney died in 1367, it passed to Sir Nicholas Lovaine (Sir William's stepfather). The manor then passed through many generations of that family, including Sir Philip St Clere. In 1550, Sir Thomas Cheney, a Lord Warden of the Cinque Ports, became owner.

During the reign of Edward II, after the split, The Manor of Queen-Court passed to Fulk Peyforer, then in 1357 to Sir William de Clinton. It then returned to the Crown's control after his death. Nicholas Potin (a sheriff of Kent) then leased the manor. In 1550, it passed to Sir Thomas Cheney. When the two manors became one manor. Sir Henry Cheney (Sir Thomas's son) then sold the estate to Richard Thornhill, of London. By 1789, George North, 3rd Earl of Guilford (once MP for Harwich).

Also included in the Parish of Ospringe were the estates of 'Plumford' and 'Painters' (the latter is now part of Painters Forstal), which were both Manors of Queencourt. It was held in 1547, by the son of Sir Anthony Aucher (an MP for Canterbury). The manor passed through various owners in the same way as the Manor of Ospringe.

Another estate was Brogdale and Brook Farm (near the hamlet of Whitehill), named after the brook that flows through Ospringe. Brook Farm is now a Grade II listed building.

Another estate is Elverland, (once called Elvyland). It was owned by John, the youngest son of Bertram de Criol (High Sheriff of Essex in 1239). It passed to his son, Nicholas de Criol. Then it passed to the Maison Dieu, who leased it out for a fee. After the hospital at Maison Dieu ended it passed into private hands again. The Manor House is now a Grade II listed building.

Another small estate is Hansletts (once called Hansells or Hansletts forstal). This passed through various private hands. Hansletts House is now a Grade II listed building.

West of the parish, on Judd's Hill, is Folly House. It is in the grounds of a five-acre (2 hectares) wood, which in 1201 was owned by the Bishop of Rochester, Gilbert Glanvill. Henry Sandford (a later Bishop) passed the wood to a local resident and his heirs. It now has become Judd's Folly Hotel, and Syndale Park Fitness Club.

West of Folly House is the estate of Syndale, also in private hands. Now part of Syndale Farm. Syndale Farmhouse is Grade II listed. Until 1961, a Palladian-style house known as Syndale House stood in the grounds immediately south of the A2. It was completely destroyed by fire and not rebuilt. The grounds were investigated by television's Time Team, in search of a possible early Roman fort adjoining the main Roman road from the continent to London. The fort was not found, though many traces of a Roman presence were.

The Church of St Paul and St Peter was built in the early 1200s. In 1384, it was under the Abbot of Pontiniac (in France). Then it (and the attached parsonage) became a possession of the Maison Dieu. In 1558, the parsonage was privately leased by Robert Streynsham (a former secretary of the 1st Earl of Pembroke), and then passed through his family.

== See also ==
- Mount Field
- Listed buildings in Ospringe
