= Durolevum =

Coordinates: 51.31610°N 0.85507°E

Durolevum was a Roman settlement in Britain. One surviving mention of it from antiquity appears in the Antonine Itinerary, where it forms part of the Roman equivalent of Watling Street, connecting Rutupiae (Richborough) to Londinium (London). Another is on the Peutinger map. It is now thought to have been located either at Newington, Swale in Kent following the discovery of a Roman industrial town at Watling Place housing estate in 2019 - a Romano-British temple Watling Temple is on open display at the site where were found late Iron Age remains dating from 30BC and the Roman town during an archaeological dig covering 18-acres - or at Ospringe in Kent, after the discovery of Roman ruins between Judd's Hill and Beacon Hill in 1931, but this remains uncertain.

== See also ==
- Newington, near Sittingbourne, 'probable site of Durolevum'
- Watling Temple, Newington - Romano-British temple
- Newington History Group
- Faversham Stone Chapel
