= Listed buildings in Ospringe =

Historic structures in Kent, England

Ospringe is a village and civil parish in the Swale District of Kent, England. It contains 29 listed buildings that are recorded in the National Heritage List for England. Of these two are grade II* and 27 are grade II.

This list is based on the information retrieved online from Historic England .

== Key ==
Grade	Criteria
I	Buildings that are of exceptional interest
II*	Particularly important buildings of more than special interest
II	Buildings that are of special interest

== Listing ==
Name	Grade	Location	Type	Completed (Note: The date given is the date used by Historic England as significant for the initial building or that of an important part in the structure's description.)	Date designated	Grid ref. (Note: The grid reference is based on the British national grid reference system, sometimes known as OSGB36, used by the Ordnance Survey.) Geo-coordinates	Notes	Entry number (Note: The "List Entry Number" is a unique number assigned to each listed building and scheduled monument by Historic England.)	Image	Wikidata
The Oaks, and Garden Wall to East and South of House	II	Abbots Hill			24 January 1967	TQ9937059866; 51°18′11″N 0°51′31″E		1069225	Upload Photo	Q26322038
Brogdale Farmhouse	II	Brogdale Road			4 May 1970	TR0064859666; 51°18′03″N 0°52′37″E		1031805	Upload Photo	Q26283195
The Manor House	II	Elverland			28 August 1986	TQ9781358333; 51°17′23″N 0°50′08″E		1343969	Upload Photo	Q26627730
Scott's Farmhouse	II	Hanslett's Road			28 August 1986	TQ9823159340; 51°17′55″N 0°50′32″E		1069226	Upload Photo	Q26322040
Hansletts House	II	Hansletts Road			28 August 1986	TQ9810159377; 51°17′57″N 0°50′25″E		1376903	Upload Photo	Q26657412
Churchman's Farmhouse	II	Kennaways			24 January 1967	TQ9921158360; 51°17′22″N 0°51′20″E		1031377	Upload Photo	Q26282737
Little Oaks	II	Painter's Forstal			28 August 1986	TQ9944759606; 51°18′02″N 0°51′35″E		1343970	Upload Photo	Q26627731
Painter's Farmhouse	II	Painter's Forstal			24 January 1967	TQ9907159017; 51°17′44″N 0°51′14″E		1069228	Upload Photo	Q26322044
The Old House	II	Painter's Forstal			24 January 1967	TQ9941059503; 51°17′59″N 0°51′33″E		1069227	Upload Photo	Q26322042
Bayfield House	II	Painter's Forstall			24 January 1967	TQ9914858963; 51°17′42″N 0°51′18″E		1031386	Upload Photo	Q26282747
Sydnale Cottages	II	Syndale			22 May 1985	TQ9895260846; 51°18′43″N 0°51′12″E		1031367	Upload Photo	Q26282727
Syndale Farmhouse	II	Syndale			27 August 1952	TQ9891860906; 51°18′45″N 0°51′10″E		1069229	Upload Photo	Q26322046
Bier House at Tr 001604	II	Water Lane			3 August 1972	TR0010360301; 51°18′24″N 0°52′10″E		1025902	Upload Photo	Q26276832
Carthouse 20 Metres West of Queen Court	II	Water Lane			27 August 1985	TR0011060477; 51°18′30″N 0°52′11″E		1069190	Upload Photo	Q26321965
Church of St Peter and St Paul	II*	Water Lane	church building		29 July 1950	TR0002860311; 51°18′24″N 0°52′06″E		1343988	Church of St Peter and St Paul More images	Q17546535
Lychgate to Churchyard, 20 Metres North East of Church of St Peter and St Paul	II	Water Lane			28 August 1986	TR0005760329; 51°18′25″N 0°52′08″E		1069193	Upload Photo	Q26321971
Monument to Andrew Long, 50 Metres North East of Church of St Peter and St Paul	II	Water Lane			28 August 1986	TR0006560359; 51°18′26″N 0°52′08″E		1069191	Upload Photo	Q26321967
Monument to Anne Chapman, 40 Metres North East of Church of St Peter and St Paul	II	Water Lane			28 August 1986	TR0005660347; 51°18′25″N 0°52′08″E		1069192	Upload Photo	Q26321969
Monument to Catherine Chichester 30 Metres West of St Peter and St Paul	II	Water Lane			28 August 1986	TQ9999060333; 51°18′25″N 0°52′04″E		1343989	Upload Photo	Q26627746
Stables and Coachhouse 20 Metres South West of the Old Vicarage	II	Water Lane			28 August 1986	TR0006560178; 51°18′20″N 0°52′08″E		1069230	Upload Photo	Q26322048
Thatch Cottages	II	1 and 2, Water Lane			3 August 1972	TR0020260632; 51°18′34″N 0°52′16″E		1069231	Upload Photo	Q26322050
The Old Vicarage	II*	Water Lane			3 August 1972	TR0008960190; 51°18′20″N 0°52′09″E		1354736	Upload Photo	Q17546591
Brook Farm	II	Whitehill			28 August 1986	TQ9985959161; 51°17′47″N 0°51′55″E		1343991	Upload Photo	Q26627748
Coldstream Cottage	II	Whitehill			28 August 1986	TQ9982359132; 51°17′46″N 0°51′53″E		1343990	Upload Photo	Q26627747
Courtyard and Garden Walls and Integral Outbuilding 20 Metres East of Whitehill House	II	Whitehill			28 August 1986	TR0008759279; 51°17′51″N 0°52′07″E		1343992	Upload Photo	Q26627749
Forge Cottage	II	1 and 2, Whitehill			28 August 1986	TQ9984459146; 51°17′47″N 0°51′54″E		1069194	Upload Photo	Q26321973
Hand Pump 10 Metres North West of 1-2 Whitehill	II	Whitehill			28 August 1986	TQ9984059153; 51°17′47″N 0°51′54″E		1069195	Upload Photo	Q26321975
Orchard End	II	Whitehill			24 January 1967	TQ9993059204; 51°17′49″N 0°51′59″E		1355031	Upload Photo	Q26637835
Whitehill House	II	Whitehill			24 January 1967	TR0005959267; 51°17′51″N 0°52′06″E		1069196	Upload Photo	Q26321977

== See also ==
- Grade I listed buildings in Kent
- Grade II* listed buildings in Kent

== Sources ==
- Newman, John (2013) [1969], Kent: North-East and East, The Buildings of England, New Haven and London: Yale University Press, ISBN 978-0-300-18506-5
