= Faversham Miniature Railway =

UK railway line

Coordinates: 51.3°N 0.877°E

Overview
- Status: Operating
- Locale: Kent
- Termini: Brogdale Central

Service
- Type: Miniature railway
- Operator: Faversham Miniature Railway Society

History
- Opened: 1985

Technical
- Track length: 1 mi (1.6 km)
- Track gauge: 9 in (229 mm)

Faversham Miniature Railway is a miniature railway at Brogdale Farm near Faversham, Kent, UK. The railway is maintained and operated entirely by a team of volunteers and opens to paying passengers every Sunday, typically between the months of March & October. It is built to the unusual gauge of 9 in (229 mm).

== History ==
Railway line running past trees

The railway first opened in 1985 in Leysdown on the Isle of Sheppey as the 'Leysdown Coastal Railway, operating with a single steam locomotive and two sit-astride carriages. In 1987, the track was severely damaged by the Great Storm and forced to close.

Shortly afterwards, the railway relocated to Norton Ash Garden Centre and became Norton Ash Miniature Railway. The single steam locomotive was joined by a British Railway Class 35 'Hymek' replica and an electric locomotive named 'Bertie', both built by miniature railway suppliers Cromar White. After a considerable term at the garden centre, the railway was once again asked to move since its presence did not fit with the landlords development plans for the site.

In 2001, the railway relocated to Brogdale Farm where it remains to this day.

In 2005, active volunteers formed a society to help to secure the future of the railway.

In 2009 an extension program began, taking the length of the line up from 1/4 mi to approximately 1 mi. By March 2012, the extension had opened to paying passengers.

As of 2022, operations have restarted since Lockdown and the Railway continues to upgrade its infrastructure and trackwork, with the platforms at Brogdale Central undergoing an extension program, plans to replace the Signalbox, and the doubling of track in certain areas to increase running and storage capacity for the line.

As of August 2023 currently these plans are on hold whilst the farm undergoes sale.

Both Class 31 and Class 20 locomotives have been rebuilt, whilst the Class 58 has now returned from its loan to the Torry Hill Railway, another 9 inch (private) miniature railway.

The also has a steam locomotive, an N Class. This locomotive is generally seen on the roster on event days at the farm, although it does appear occasionally on non event days standing in for the diesel lococs when unavailable.

The railway has a selection of coaching, freight and maintenance stock.

Plans to update the line and equipment have now been revisited and are in the detailed stages of deployment, June 2026.

== Stations ==
- Brogdale Central
