= Gwna Group =

Geological group in north-west Wales

- Stratigraphic range: Ediacaran / Cambrian
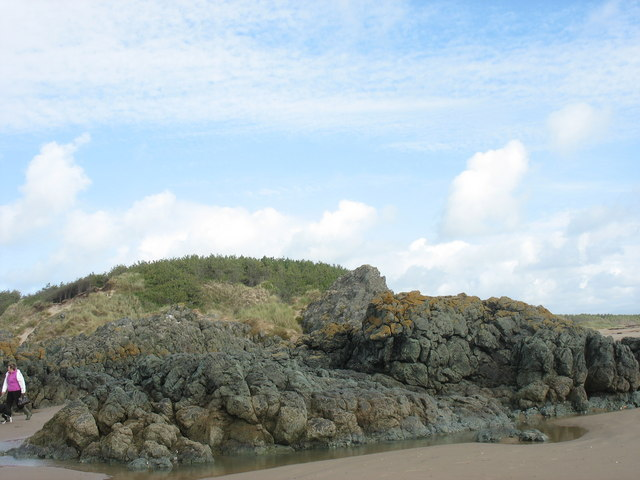
- Pillow lavas at Gwddw Llanddwyn, Anglesey
- Type: Group
- Unit of: Monian Supergroup
- Underlies: Fydlyn Group
- Overlies: Church Bay Tuffs
- Thickness: several hundred metres

Lithology
- Primary: mélange
- Other: schist, granite, limestone, sandstone, mudstone

Location
- Region: north Wales
- Country: Wales

Type section
- Named for: Afon Gwna

The Gwna Group (Welsh pronunciation: [ˈɡwnaː]; anglicised roughly “GW-nah”) is a late Precambrian (Ediacaran) / Cambrian lithostratigraphic group (a sequence of rock strata) in northwest Wales. The name is derived from the Afon Gwna, a river near Bodorgan on Anglesey where the strata are exposed. This rock sequence is also commonly referred to as the Gwna Mélange.

== Outcrops ==
These rocks are exposed across various parts of Anglesey and along the northern coast of Llŷn and at Bardsey Island.

== Lithology and stratigraphy ==
The Group is considered to represent the result of an olistostrome, a giant underwater gravity slide, which occurred probably as a result of tectonic activity at some time after 614 million years ago. It includes clasts, at all sizes from millimetres up to a kilometre or more, of a diverse range of both sedimentary and igneous rocks. Since deposition the group as a whole has been subject to low grade metamorphism. Very large limestone clasts within the mélange which have been dated to between 860 and 800 Ma contain stromatolites which are the oldest known fossils in Wales.

== Ocean-plate stratigraphy and tectonic setting ==
The Gwna Group preserves fragments of ocean-plate stratigraphy (OPS), recording the journey of an oceanic plate from its origin at a mid-ocean ridge to its destruction in a deep-sea trench. In classic OPS, massive or pillow-forming basalts lie at the base, overlain by pelagic cherts and mudstones, and finally by coarser trench-fill sediments. Detailed mapping on the Llŷn Peninsula at Porth Felen, Porth Orion, Porth Oer, Mynydd Carreg and Porth Iago has revealed multiple, repeated stacks of these rock types—imbricated by bedding-parallel thrusts—demonstrating that slices of ocean floor and trench sediment were progressively accreted into an early Cambrian accretionary wedge.

Detrital zircons separated from the finest trench-fill sandstones and mudstones yield maximum depositional ages that fall into two distinct intervals. "Type 1" Gwna sequences (at Mynydd Carreg and Porth Iago) lack red claystones and give youngest zircon ages of about 612–600 Ma, whereas "Type 2" sequences (at Porth Felen, Porth Orion and Porth Oer) are marked by thick, red-bed claystones and have depositional limits of 564–539 Ma. This implies two pulses of trench accumulation—first in the latest Neoproterozoic, then in the early Cambrian—each incorporated as thrust slices into the Avalonian fore-arc.

These pulses of sediment accretion took place at the same time as a belt of volcanic and plutonic activity farther inland. To the east, the Coedana granite was emplaced at about 613 Ma, the Arfon Group volcanic arcs were active around 614–615 Ma, and widespread back-arc ash layers (tuffs) formed between 566 and 559 Ma, while deeply buried ocean-floor rocks were uplifted as blueschist around 560–550 Ma. The age mix in the detrital zircons—especially the abundance of grains about 650–600 Ma alongside older Mesoproterozoic–Archean grains—shows their source lay in the Amazonian craton neighbouring Avalonia in the late Precambrian. In sum, the Gwna Group records a Pacific-style orogeny in which slices of ocean crust and trench sediments were successively scraped off and stacked beneath Avalonia between roughly 620 and 500 Ma.
