= Ian Sturrock =

Ian Sturrock is a rescuer and restorer of orchards and apple trees, saving apple varieties from extinction. He discovered the last remaining Bardsey apple, and rescued the Diamond apple, as well as many other Welsh apples.

He was a finalist for a 2016 St David Award.
