= Painters Forstal =

Village in Kent, England

Coordinates: 51.295°N 0.856°E

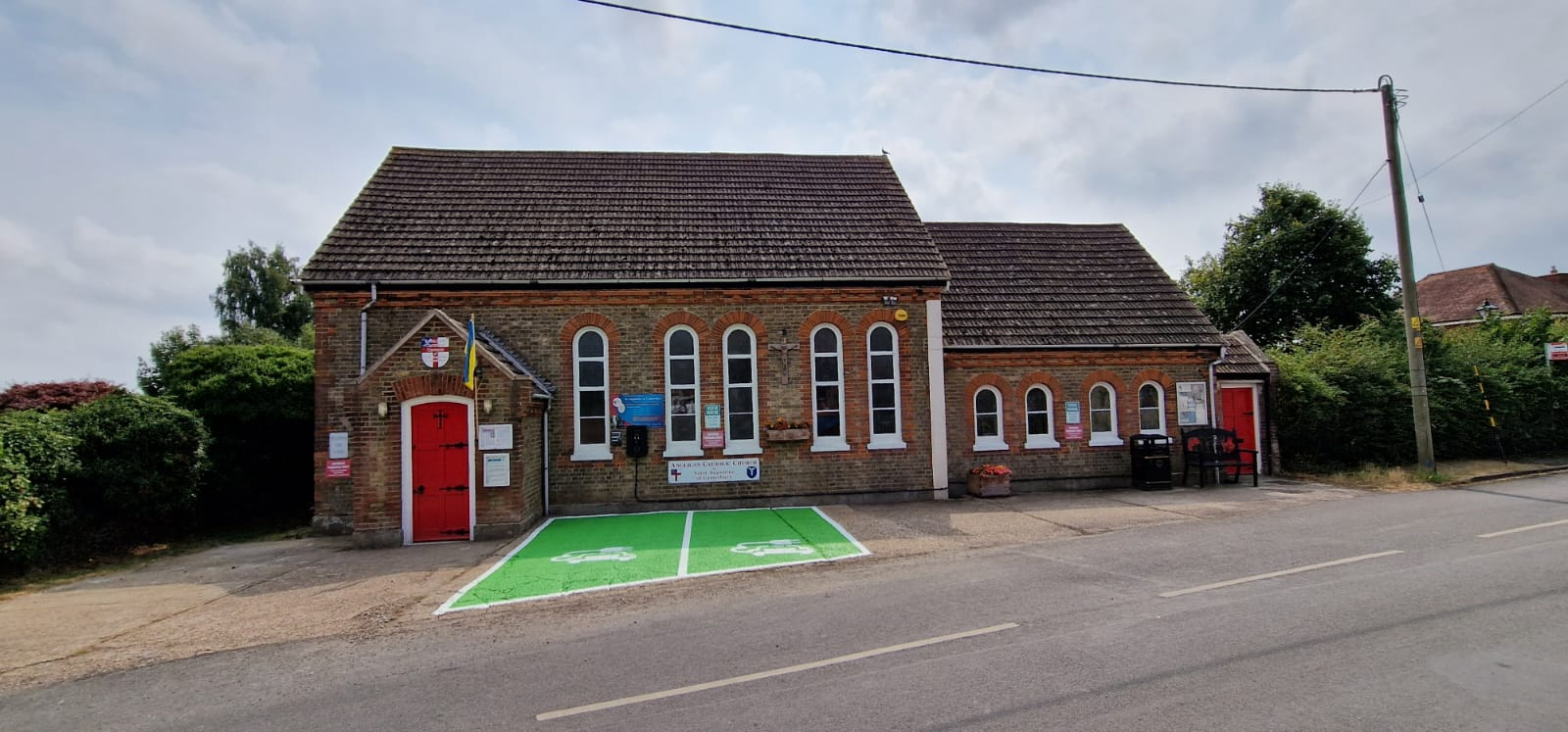
- Anglican Catholic Church of St Augustine, Painters Forstal, Faversham, Kent

- Location within Kent
- OS grid reference: TQ993590
- District: Swale
- Shire county: Kent
- Region: South East
- Country: England
- Sovereign state: United Kingdom
- Post town: FAVERSHAM
- Postcode district: ME13 0
- Dialling code: 01795

Painters Forstal (Painter's Forstal on Ordnance Survey maps) is a village in the Swale district of the English county of Kent. It is 2 miles (3.2 km) south-west of the town of Faversham and is part of the civil parish of Ospringe. It lies just south of the M2 motorway, and has developed almost completely since the 1950s.

The manor of Painters was an estate in the parish of Ospringe. According to Edward Hasted in 1798, it was held in 1547 by the son of Sir Anthony Aucher (MP for Canterbury). The manor passed through various owners, similar to the manor of Ospringe.

Within the village are four listed buildings, all Grade II on the National Heritage List for England; Little Oaks, Bayfield House, Old House, and Painter's Farmhouse.

The village has a public house, 'The Alma'.

The village has a purpose built community hall that was opened on 24 June 2023. The hall construction was possible thanks to a huge fundraising effort let by a body of trustees. The Community Hall can be booked for weddings, events, clubs and social meetings.

There is a former Wesleyan Methodist chapel in the village, dating from 1873, which was known for many years as Whitehill Chapel & Champion Hall. In 2019 the building was purchased by the Diocese of the United Kingdom of the Anglican Catholic Church and renamed The Anglican Catholic Church of St Augustine of Canterbury.
