= Mount Field (cricket ground) =

Cricket ground in Faversham, England

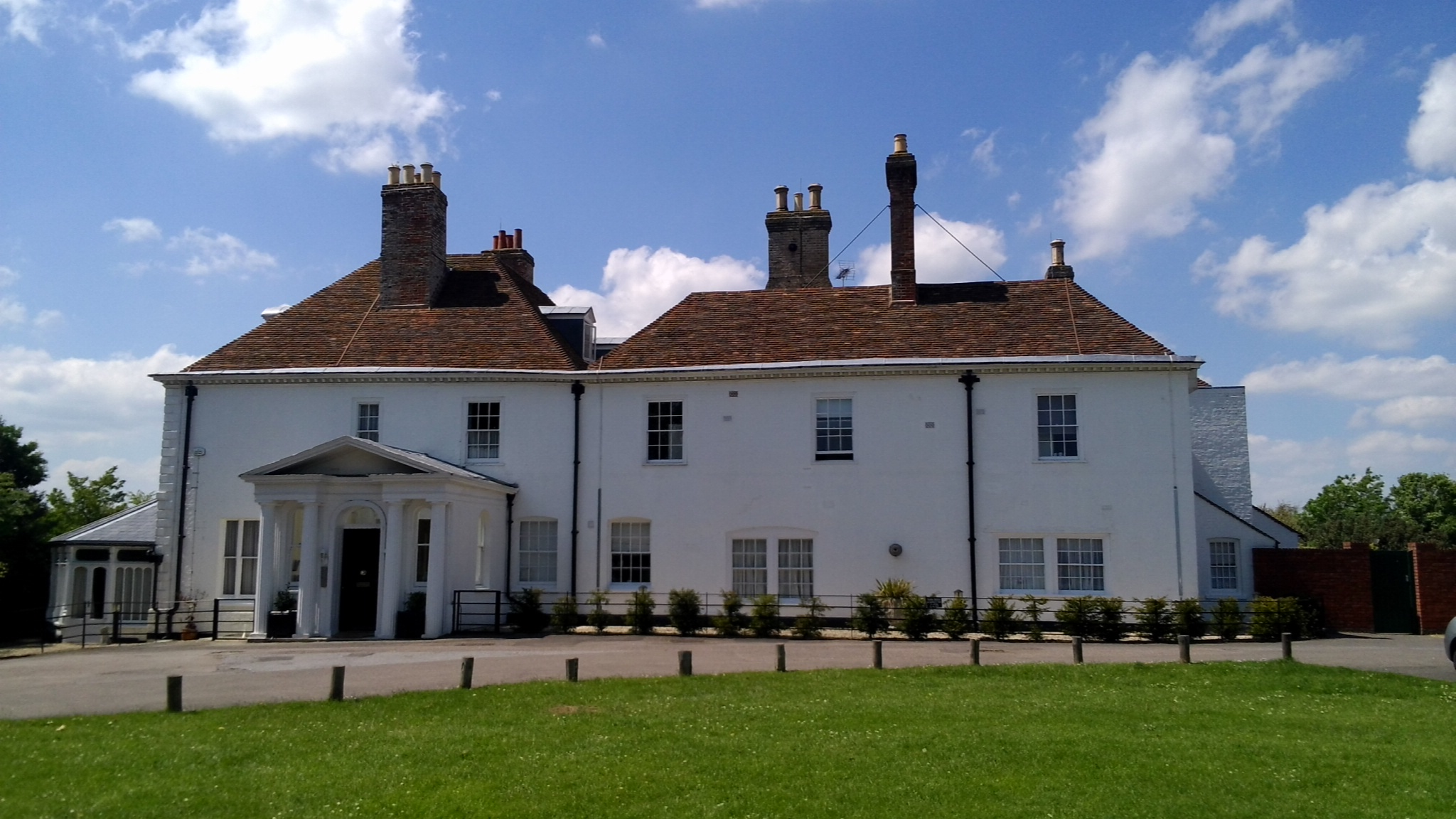
- The Mount, a house standing in the corner of the present day field
- Interactive map of Mount Field

Ground information
- Location: Ospringe, Faversham, Kent
- Country: England
- Coordinates: 51.311°N 0.879°E

Team information
Kent County Cricket Club	(1876)
- As of 9 December 2017; Source: CricketArchive

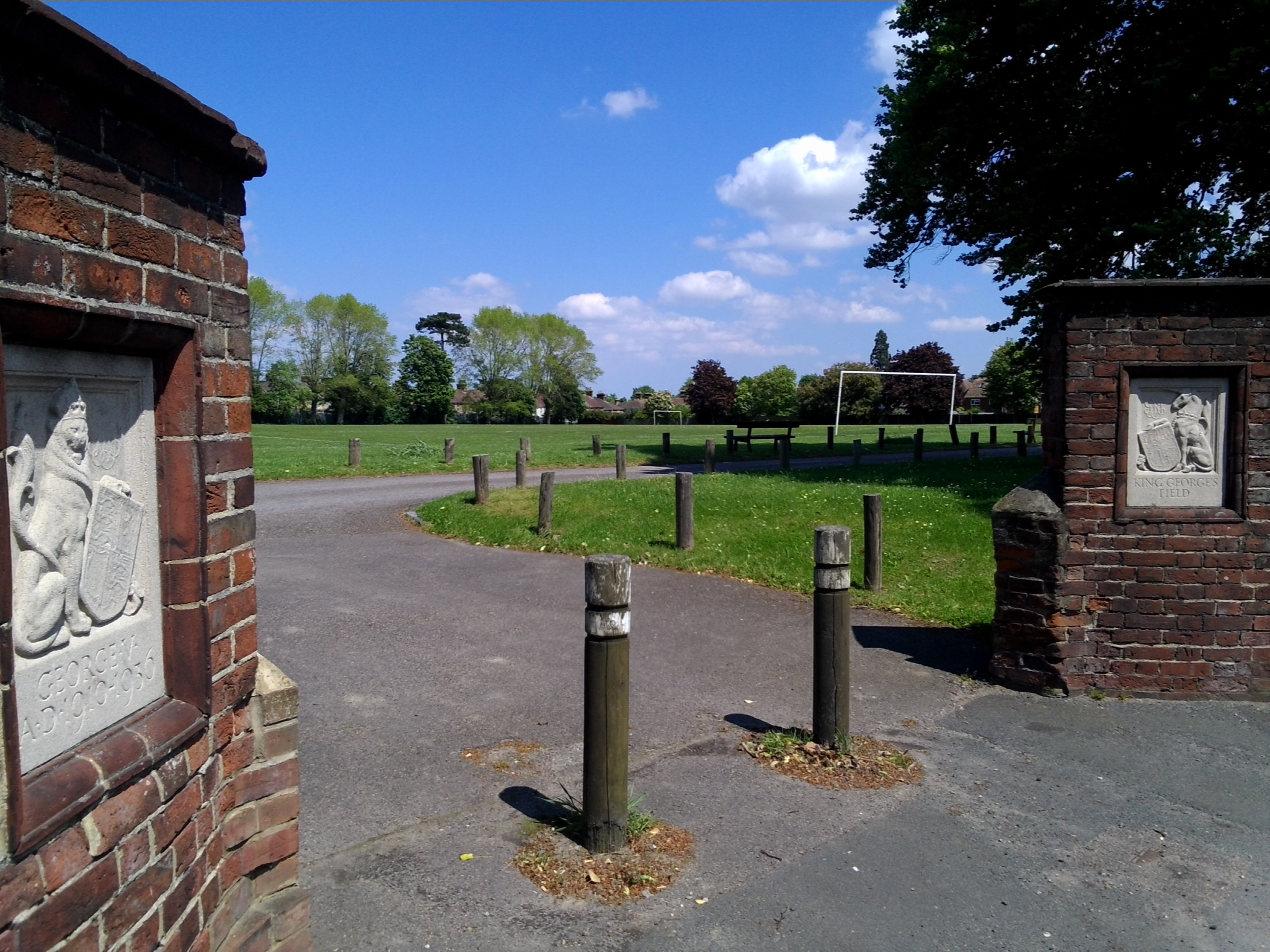
Entrance to the King George's Playing Field

Mount Field was a cricket ground located at Ospringe on the south-western edge of Faversham in the English county of Kent. It was associated with The Mount, a large house built west of the ground, and was used for one first-class cricket match in 1876.

== Cricketing history ==
The ground was used to host one first-class match in 1876. Kent County Cricket Club lost to Hampshire County Cricket Club by an innings and six runs in August in a fixture which immediately followed the club's Canterbury Cricket Week festival. It was used by Faversham Cricket Club in the 19th century, but only one other scorecard of a match is known to exist, an 1864 fixture between the Gentlemen of Kent and the Gentlemen of Sussex, and was the home ground used by the cricket team from the local gunpowder works in the 1920s.

The ground was located between the main A2 London Road and the main London, Chatham and Dover railway line just to the east of Ospringe and 0.5 miles (0.80 km) west of Faversham railway station. Most of the ground is now built over, with a residential road called Mount Field occupying the area of the ground. A small strip of the ground remains as part of the 3.2 hectares (7.9 acres) King George V playing field.

== The Mount ==
The Mount is a large 18th-century house which is situated in the south-western corner of the remaining playing field at the eastern edge of Ospringe. It was described as one of "a number of elegant seats" along the road east of Ospringe in 1837, at which point it was occupied by Lieutenant-general Gerard Gosselin, a Deputy Lieutenant of Kent and a magistrate, and known as Mount Ospringe. Gosselin had joined the Marine Forces in 1780 and transferred to the Army later in his career. He served in the Napoleonic Wars and was appointed Commandant of the Republic of Genoa after he commanded a Brigade during its capture in April 1814. Later in the year he commanded a Brigade at the Capture of Castine in Maine during the War of 1812 and then commanded British forces at Halifax, Nova Scotia.

Gosselin died in 1859 and by 1866 the house was occupied by Percy Beale Neame, a hop farmer who, in 1864, had become a partner in the Faversham brewing business which became known as Shepherd Neame. Neame and his wife Florence, lived at the house until his death at the age of 76 in 1913 and all ten of his children were born there. On his death the estate, including the business, of which he was the sole owner, as well as the house was worth £240,000.

Florence remarried in 1915 and the house, which was empty, was used as a Voluntary Aid Detachment hospital during World War I. After the war it was used as a home for refugee children from Serbia and in 1921 it became a National Children's Home property, closing in the 1930s. The building, which is a Grade II listed building, was later used as an office by the Ministry of National Insurance and by the Kent Agricultural Emergency Committee. It is now divided into residential flats.
