= Bardsey Bird and Field Observatory =

Bird observatory in the British Isles

Coordinates: 52.759°N 4.788°W

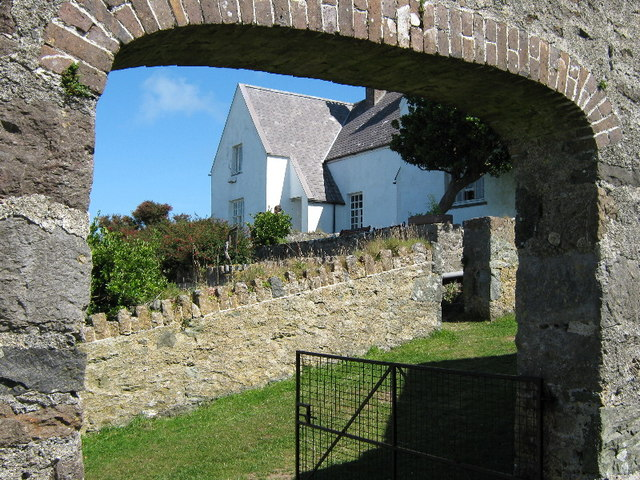
Cristin House, home of the Bardsey Bird and Field Observatory

Bardsey Bird and Field Observatory is a bird observatory on Bardsey Island, off the Welsh coast.

It was founded in 1953 by a group of ornithologists from the West Midland Bird Club (who were represented on the observatory's management committee), the West Wales Field Society, and local people. The West Midlands Bird club not only saw a possibility for a new bird observatory, but an opportunity for studying the complex ecology of a small island.

The observatory's main objective is to monitor and census the breeding and migratory birds which use the island. Observatory staff undertake a daily census, with a log of the day's sightings taken each evening. Spring and summer are particularly intensive times when the populations of breeding landbirds and seabirds are counted.

BBFO is one of two fully accredited observatory in Wales and is 1 of 20 accredited bird observatories around the coast of the UK and Ireland. It is recognised by the Bird Observatories Council. Bardsey Island or Ynys Enlli is of great conservation importance and is designated as a National Nature Reserve (NNR), Site of Special Scientific Interest (SSSI), Special Protection Area (SPA), Environmentally Sensitive Area (ESA), Llyn Peninsula Special Area of Conservation (SAC) and Area of Outstanding Natural Beauty. It is part of the Llyn Peninsula Heritage Coast.

Steven Stansfield is the current Warden and Director of Operations and has been resident on the island since January 1998 and is the longest serving member of staff at the Observatory.

Bardsey Bird Observatory and Field Centre is a registered charity.

== See also ==
- Eifion Jones
