= Newington, Swale =

Village in Kent, England

Coordinates: 51.352°N 0.6679°E

Newington
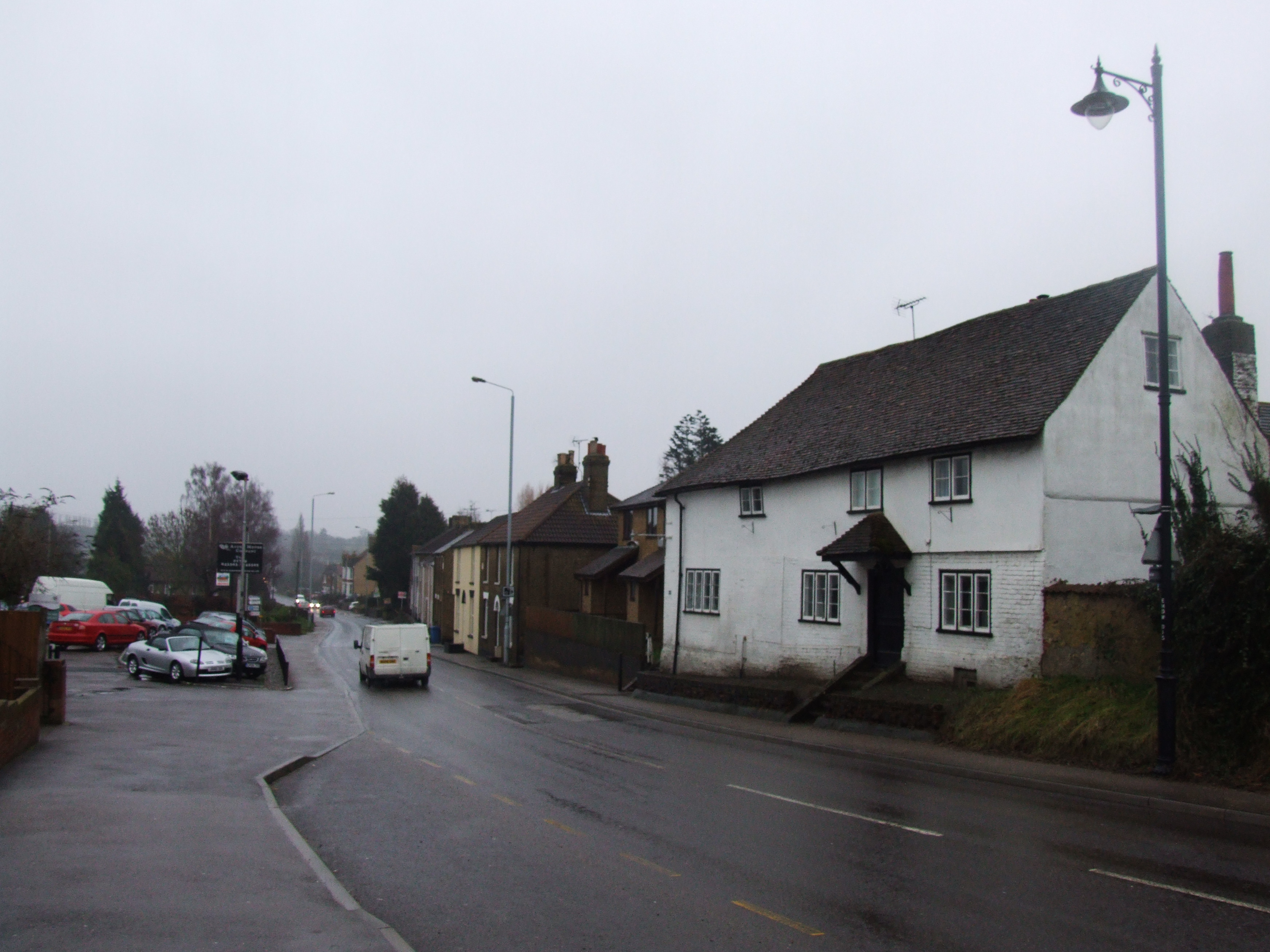
- A2 High Street

- Location within Kent
- Population: 2,551 (2011 census)
- Civil parish: Newington
- District: Swale
- Shire county: Kent
- Region: South East
- Country: England
- Sovereign state: United Kingdom
- Post town: SITTINGBOURNE
- Postcode district: ME9
- Dialling code: 01795
- Police: Kent
- Fire: Kent
- Ambulance: South East Coast
- UK Parliament: Sittingbourne and Sheppey

Newington is a village and civil parish in the borough of Swale in Kent, England. The parish is located beside the A2 road (originally a Roman road) between Rainham to the west and Sittingbourne to the east. The population of the parish in 2011 was 2,551.

The village has its own railway station which is situated on the Chatham Main Line between Sittingbourne and Rainham.

The parish church, dedicated to St Mary the Virgin, is a grade I listed building. It was built between 1163 and 1177 by Richard de Lucy, with additions being made in the 13th and 14th century. The church was to eventually become the property of Henry VIII who gave it to the Provost and Fellows of Eton College in 1531. The patron today is the Archbishop of Canterbury. There is a stone in the church car park known as the Devil's Stone, which is said to bear the Devil's footprint.

Newington village sign was provided by Mrs. S Huxtable in 2007. It holds a memorial plate in memory of Mr. P Huxtable. (Husband of Mrs S. Huxtable)

Newington holds the national collection of Witch Hazel which is kept at the Witch Hazel Nursery in Callaways Lane

Newington Manor, now a conservation area, is to the south of the village.

The Newington Pill Boxes: Newington has at least four World War I pill boxes (or bunkers) at various locations.

== History ==
Newington acquired its name (Newetone) in Saxon times meaning 'New Town' built on an old one.

The Roman Watling Street runs through the village.

The ancient settlement was rediscovered in 2019 and is the site of late Iron Age remains dating from 30BC and a Roman town. An archaeological dig covering 18 acres and carried out by SWAT Archaeology has found, among others, iron furnaces and pottery kilns as part of a manufacturing site, a Roman temple (Watling Temple), a seven metre wide Roman road and thousands of pottery remains. The newly discovered road predates Watling Street and takes an alternative route.

It was also possibly the site of the lost Roman station Durolevum. The remains of a Roman villa were discovered at Boxted Farm, Newington in 1882.

One of the earliest references to Newington comes from a charter c.1131 regarding Sheppey Monastery. It refers to Aveline, the mother of Richard de Lucy of Newington, Kent.

Historians belonging to Newington History Group work to research, record and protect the village history and heritage. They have been involved with preservation projects. They participate in the annual Heritage Open Days event, hold monthly talks, and host history and nature walks.

== People ==
- Don Potter, a 20th-century sculptor and potter, was born in Newington.

== Sporting teams ==
Newington has a cricket club. Members of the Medway Sunday League, they field two Sunday XI's that play home games at either Bobbing Court (just off Rook Lane) or at Upchurch Cricket Club.

== Entertainment ==
Being a small village, entertainment is at a premium in Newington. However, there are Chinese and Indian takeaways, and one pub, The Bull, which is the village's sole remaining pub. In the past several other pubs existed in Newington and many of those buildings still stand: the White Hart (now an office and was a general store), the Wheatsheaf (letting agents) and the George (houses) are all on the High Street.
