= Eifion Jones =

Welsh botanist (1925–2004)

William Eifion Jones (1925 – March 2004) was a Welsh marine botanist, noted for his study of marine algae.

He was born and brought up in Aberystwyth and studied botany at the University of Wales under Professor Lilly Newton. He moved to Bangor in 1953 to join the newly founded Marine Biology Station as a lecturer with Denis Crisp, and completed his PhD in 1957. He had a wife, Marian, and two children, Rhiannon and Aled.

He retired early in 1986, but went on to lecture in Kuwait, returning to do part-time lecturing at the University of Wales, Bangor. He died in a car accident at Gaerwen, aged 79.

He wrote A key to the Genera of the British Seaweeds (1962). It was most valuable as an update to Newton's Handbook of 1931 had become out-of-date and this was required to identify the genera of algae to be found on the shores of the British Isles.

He joined the British Phycological Society in 1955 and served as a Member of Council (1959 and 1974–1977), as Assistant Secretary (1959) and Hon. Treasurer (1964–1968). At the Eighth International Seaweed Symposium, held in Bangor in 1974, he was a member of the organizing committee and secretary. He was President of the North Wales Wildlife Trust and Bardsey Bird and Field Observatory.

== Publications ==
- Jones, W.E. 1956. Effect of spore coalescence on the early development of Gracilaria verrucosa (Hudson) Papenfuss. Nature, Lond. 178: 426 - 427.
- Jones, W.E. 1958. Experiments on some effects of certain environmental factors on Gracilaria verrucosa (Huds.) Papenf. Journal of the Marine biological Association of the United Kingdom., 38: 153 - 167.
- Jones, W.E. 1959. The growth and fruiting of Gracilaria verrucosa (Hudson) Papenfuss. Journal of the Marine Biological Association of the United Kingdom., 38: 47 - 56.
- Jones, W.E. 1962a. "A key to the genera of the British Seaweeds." Field Studies. 1: No.4. pp. 1 – 32.
- Jones, W.E. 1962b. The identity of Gracilaria erecta (Grev.) Grev. British phycological Bulletin 2: 140 - 144.
- Jones, W.E.(Ed.) 1968. Natural History of Anglesey. Anglesey Antiquarian Society, Llangefni.
- Jones, W.E. and Moorjani, S.A. 1973. The attachment and early development of the tetraspores of some coralline red algae. Special Publications of the Marine Biological Associations of India. 1973: 293 - 304.
- Jones, W.E. 1974. Changes in the seaweed flora of the British Isles. In Hawkesworth, D.L. (Ed) The changing flora and fauna of Britain. pp. 97 – 113. Systematics Association Special Volume 6. Academic Press, London and New York.

== See also ==
- Menai Strait.
