= Arthur Gibson (Kent cricketer) =

English cricketer

Personal information
- Full name: Arthur Cracroft Gibson
- Born: 7 November 1863; Sittingbourne, Kent
- Died: 8 December 1895 (aged 32); Whitehill, Kent
- Batting: Right-handed
- Bowling: Right-arm medium

Domestic team information
- Years: Team
- 1883–1884: Kent

Career statistics
Competition	First-class
Matches	5
Runs scored	35
Batting average	5.83
100s/50s	0/0
Top score	17*
Balls bowled	68
Wickets	0
Bowling average	–
5 wickets in innings	–
10 wickets in match	–
Best bowling	–
Catches/stumpings	0/–
- Source: ESPNcricinfo, 29 June 2014

Arthur Cracroft Gibson (7 November 1863 – 8 December 1895) was an English cricketer who played five in first-class cricket matches for Kent County Cricket Club in 1883 and 1884. Born at Sittingbourne in Kent, Gibson was a right-handed batsman who bowled right-arm medium pace.

Gibson made his debut in first-class cricket for Kent in 1883 against Marylebone Cricket Club (MCC). He played in three further first-class matches in 1883 before making his final first-class appearance in 1884 against Sussex. He died at Whitehill near Faversham in Kent in December 1895 aged 32.

== Bibliography ==
- Carlaw, Derek (2020). Kent County Cricketers, A to Z: Part One (1806–1914) (PDF). Cardiff: ACS.
