= Watling Temple =

Roman archaeological site in England

Coordinates: 51.352451°N 0.675273°E

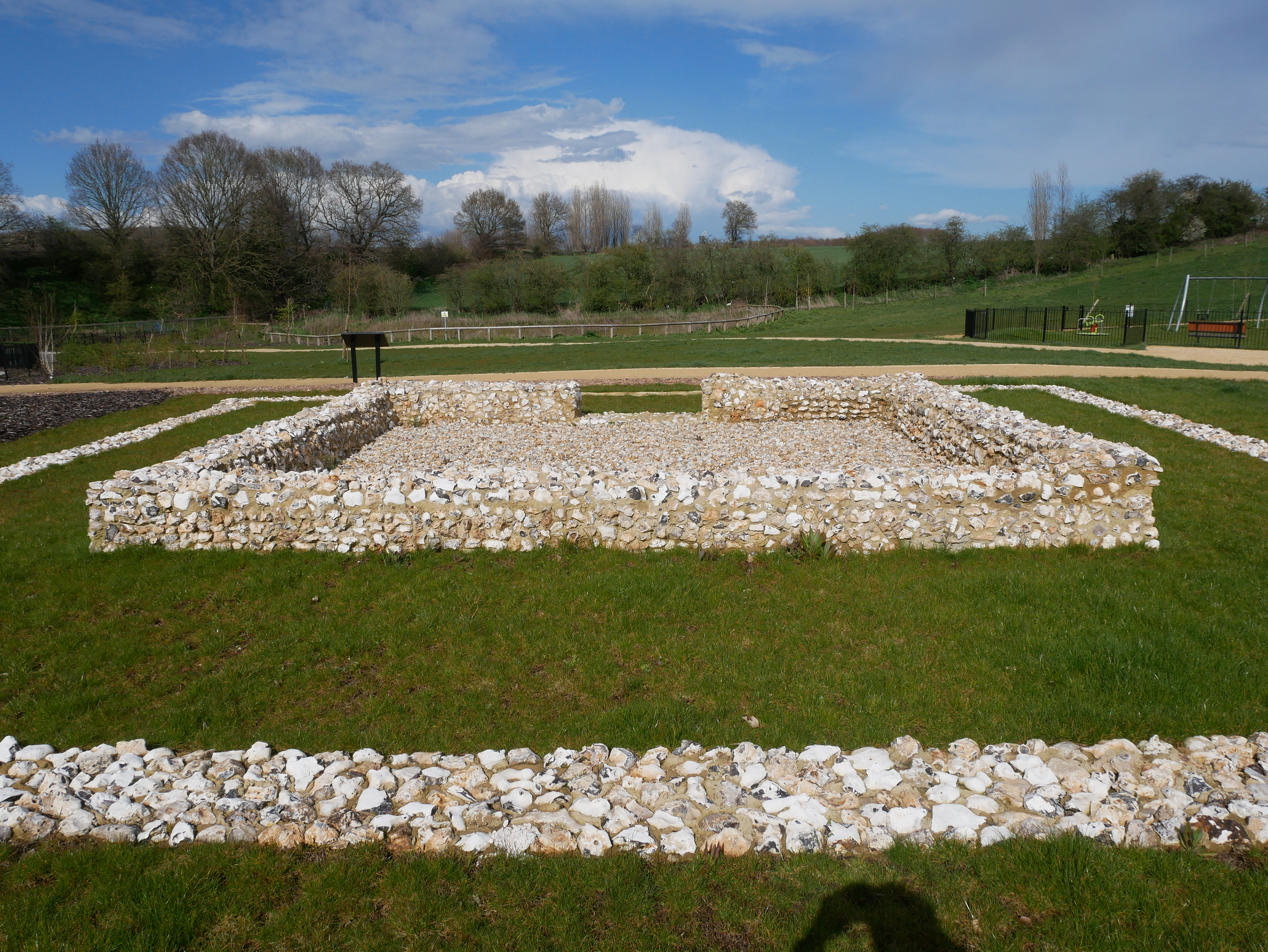
Reconstruction of Watling Temple

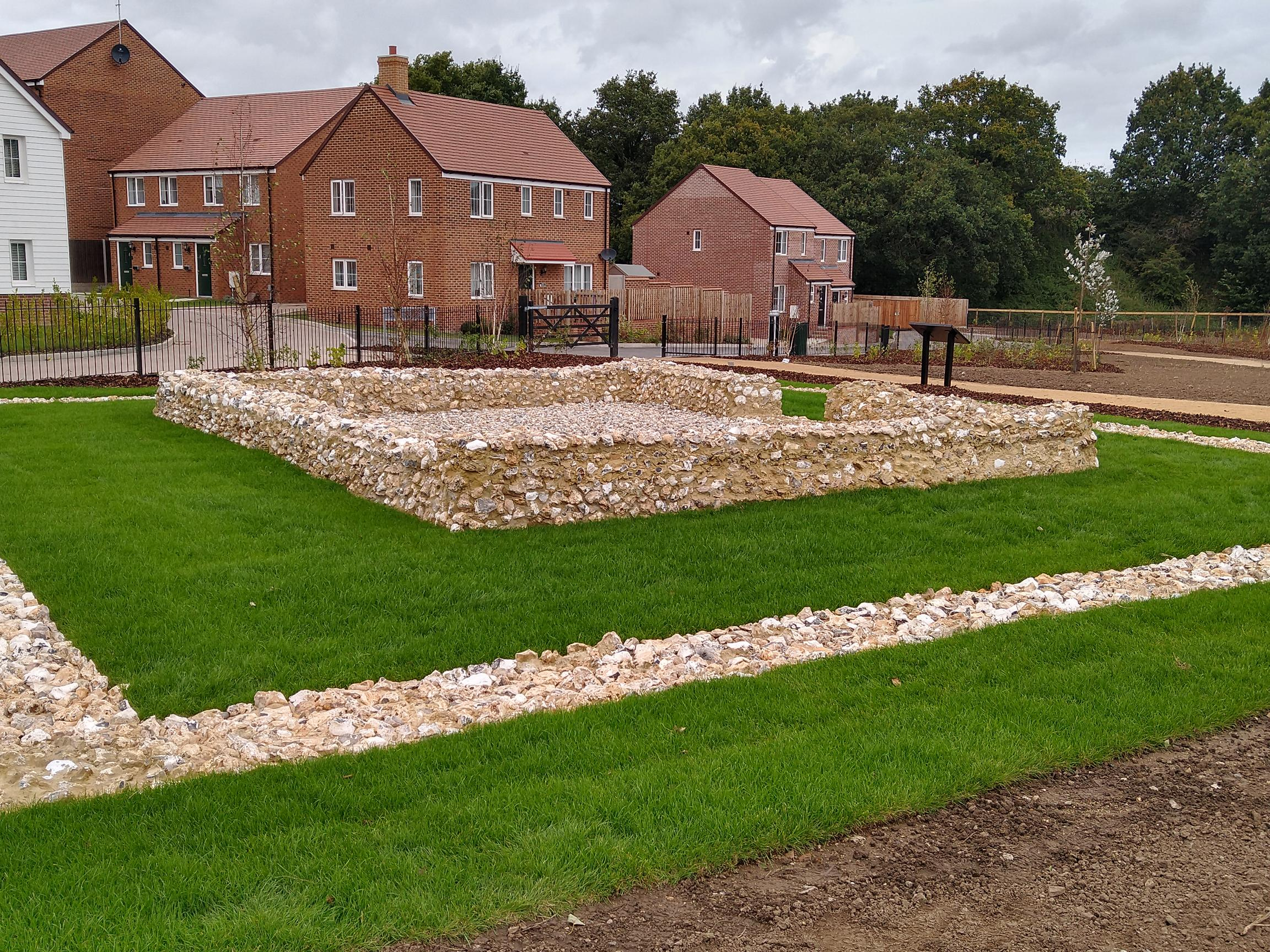
Reconstruction of Watling Temple

Watling Temple is the name given to the remains of a temple within a Roman town next to the modern A2 road in Newington, near Sittingbourne in Kent, England.

== Site description ==
The town was rediscovered in 2019 during an archaeological dig covering 18 acres (73,000 m^{2}) that found iron furnaces and pottery kilns as part of a manufacturing site, a Roman temple, a 7 metres (23 ft) wide Roman road and late Iron Age remains dating from 30 BC.

The Roman road Watling Street runs through the village of Newington, and the newly discovered road predates it and takes an alternative route.

== Reconstruction ==
A reconstruction of the temple foundations was officially unveiled in September 2021 as the result of a collaboration between Newington History Group, SWAT Archaeology and Persimmon Homes South East. The reconstruction is the same size and orientation as the original and is located only 70 metres (230 ft) away from where it was uncovered. A footpath reflects the alignment of the 7 metres (23 ft) wide Roman road to the temple. It is on permanent, free display in a landscaped plot in Newington.

== Redevelopment ==
124 homes were built atop the excavation site in a development called "Watling Place".
