= Arthur Gibson (cricketer, born 1889) =

English cricketer and Royal Navy officer

Personal information
- Full name: Arthur Kenneth Gibson
- Born: 19 May 1889; Kensington, London, England
- Died: 28 January 1950 (aged 60); Edinburgh, Scotland

Domestic team information
- Years: Team
- 1919: Somerset
- First-class debut: 25 June 1914 Royal Navy v Army
- Last First-class: 24 July 1924 Royal Navy v Army

Career statistics
Competition	First-class
Matches	5
Runs scored	139
Batting average	15.44
100s/50s	0/0
Top score	36
Balls bowled	18
Wickets	0
Bowling average	–
5 wickets in innings	0
10 wickets in match	0
Best bowling	0/11
Catches/stumpings	0/–
- Source: CricketArchive, 11 June 2011

Arthur Kenneth Gibson (19 May 1889 – 28 January 1950) was a Royal Navy officer who also played first-class cricket for Navy sides and in one match for Somerset. He was born at Kensington, London, and died at Edinburgh, Scotland.

== Cricket career ==
Gibson was an opening or middle-order batsman and an occasional bowler in his first-class matches. He played Minor Counties cricket for Hertfordshire in 1911 and 1912 and made his first-class debut for a Royal Navy team against the Army team in an inter-services match, then considered first-class, in 1914. His one game for Somerset, for whom his qualification is doubtful, was another services match against the strong Australian Imperial Forces side that played several first-class matches in the 1919 season; Gibson top-scored in a poor Somerset first innings with 22, and in the second innings was one of Herbie Collins' eight victims, the Australian batsman's best-ever return as a bowler. He played further single games for the Royal Navy side against the Army in 1920 and 1924.

== Naval career ==
Gibson was educated at the Britannia Royal Naval College, Dartmouth. He joined the Royal Navy as a midshipman on HMS Bulwark, became a sub-lieutenant in 1909 and was promoted to full lieutenant in 1911. He served throughout the First World War on torpedo boats, and commanded torpedo operations on the destroyers HMS Crane, HMS Myrmidon, HMS Acheron and HMS Rattlesnake. After the war, he trained as a physical education specialist and served at Naval training establishments across the 1920s and 1930s, with a stint as commander of HMS Heliotrope, an Azalea-class sloop, in the West Indies from 1928 to 1930. He retired from the Navy with rank of commander in 1935.
