= Whitehill, Kent =

Hamlet in Kent, England

Coordinates: 51.298°N 0.8677°E

Whitehill
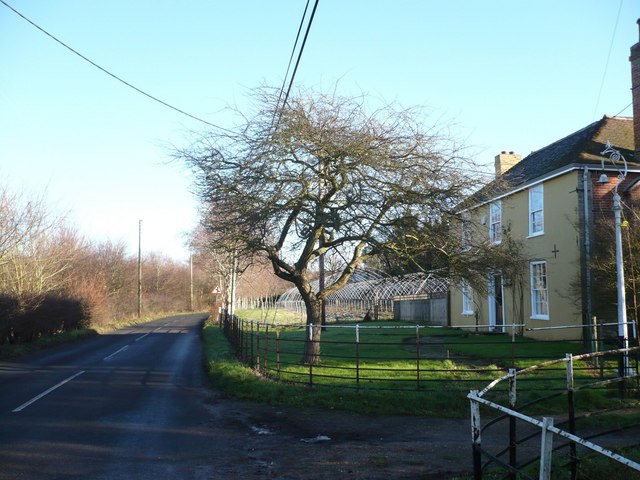
- Eastling Road, Whitehill

- Location within Kent
- Civil parish: Ospringe
- District: Swale
- Shire county: Kent
- Region: South East
- Country: England
- Sovereign state: United Kingdom
- Post town: Faversham
- Postcode district: ME13 0
- Police: Kent
- Fire: Kent
- Ambulance: South East Coast

Whitehill is a hamlet to the south of Faversham in Kent, England. A stream rises at Westbrook, a small distance south of Whitehill. At the 2011 Census, the population was included in the civil parish of Ospringe.
