= Faversham Stone Chapel =

Coordinates: 51°18′58″N 0°51′23″E

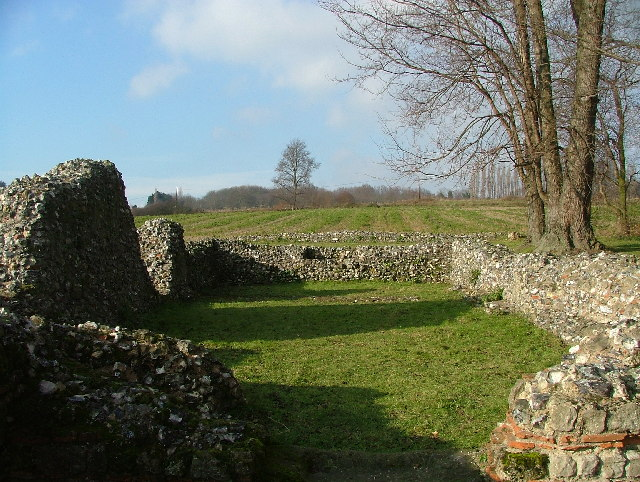
Faversham Stone Chapel.

Faversham Stone Chapel also known as Our Lady of Elwarton, is a medieval chapel built on top of a Romano-British mausoleum. The chapel is located in what is thought to have been the Roman settlement of Durolevum, near the modern town of Faversham, in Kent, England. It is the only chapel in England known to incorporate the remains of an ancient shrine or mausoleum.

== Romano-British construction ==
=== Roman Durolevum ===
Although the site now lies in a rural area on the outskirts of modern Faversham, during Roman times the area was well populated. There was probably a Roman army camp located at Judd Hill, where there is evidence of a large structure (possibly a fort), and where numerous Roman artefacts have been found. A Roman cemetery containing the remains of some three hundred and eighty-seven burials is located a few hundred yards east from the church, and a number of Roman coins and other artefacts have been discovered nearby. In 2012, Paul Wilkinson and a team of archeologists discovered and excavated an enormous cockpit-style Roman theatre seating up to 12,000 in Faversham; it is believed to be the first theatre of its kind to be built in Britain. This evidence of Roman occupation has led researchers to believe that Faversham may be the site of Roman Durolevum, mentioned in the Antonine Itinerary.

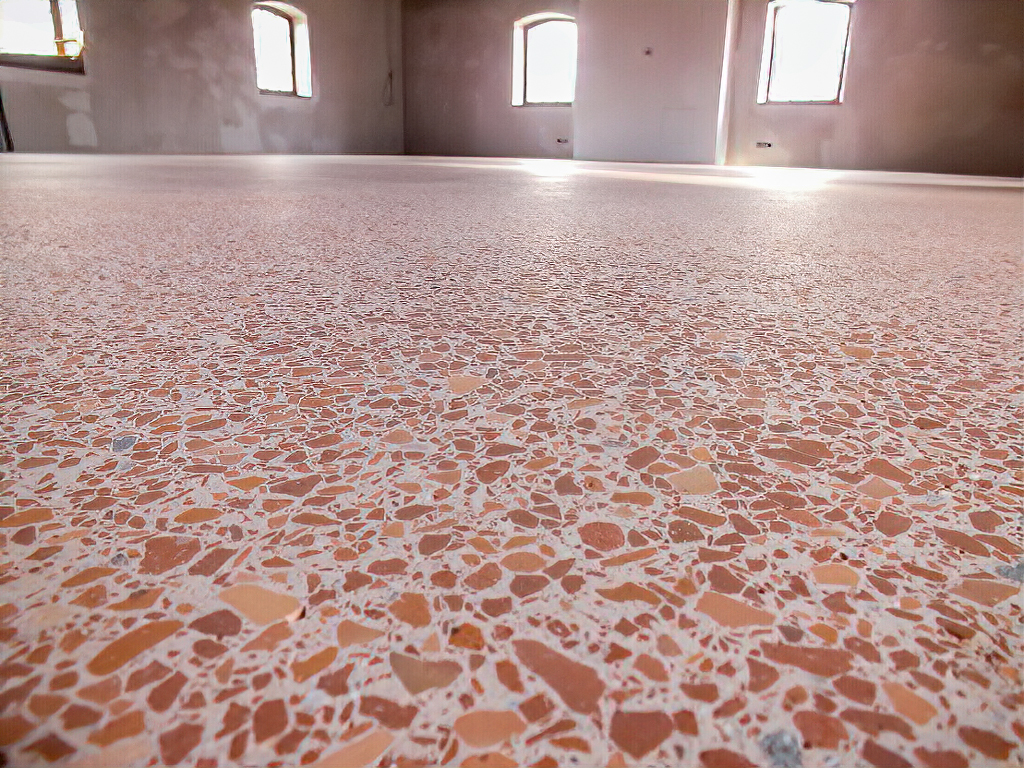
Example of an opus signinum floor made of crushed bricks or tiles

=== Roman structure ===
The Roman building is roughly square, with walls about 17 feet long and about 3 feet wide. The walls were built using a typically Roman technique, with a flint foundation and courses of tufa blocks alternating with courses of red bricks. The windowless structure had a vaulted roof, and a monolithic door constructed of greensand stone. The cill of the doorway is still in place. The floor of the structure was originally opus signinum, a hard waterproof concrete made with broken-down tiles or bricks, giving it a reddish colour. The walls were finished with plaster, which was painted red, and was possibly decorated with frescoes.

The structure of the foundation suggests that this structure was a Roman mausoleum, though in the absence of burials, this interpretation cannot be confirmed. As there is no villa or cemetery nearby, alternative explanations of the structure are that it was a Romano-Pagan temple or a small Christian shrine.

== Medieval church ==
After the Roman structure fell into disrepair, it is possible that a timber-built Saxon church existed on the site. By the medieval era, a flint church was built over the remains of the earlier Roman building, making use of its surviving walls. It is possible that a Saxon church built of wood also existed prior to the building of the medieval church. The medieval builders used the Roman building as the chancel of the church, and the nave was built to the west. The nave and the chancel were expanded in the 13th century, and buttresses were added on one side. The green sandstone door frames were used in the buttresses and can still be seen today. The church was reported to be in disrepair by 1511 and seems to have been abandoned by 1600.

The chapel is designated as an ancient monument.
