= Brogdale =

Hamlet in Kent, England

Coordinates: 51.30°N 0.87°E

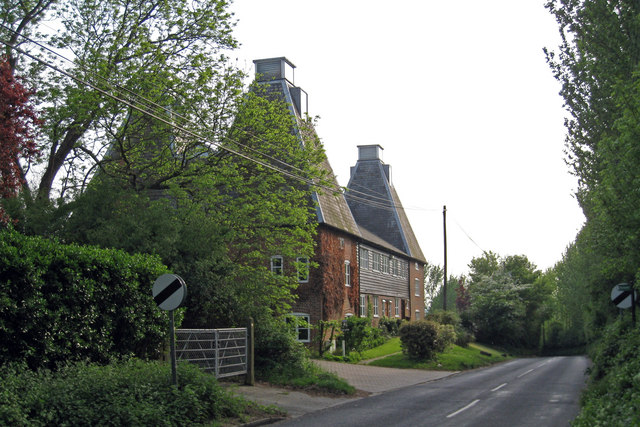
- Brogdale Oast, Brogdale Road

- Location within Kent
- Civil parish: Ospringe
- District: Swale
- Shire county: Kent
- Region: South East
- Country: England
- Sovereign state: United Kingdom
- Post town: FAVERSHAM
- Postcode district: ME13
- Dialling code: 01795
- Police: Kent
- Fire: Kent
- Ambulance: South East Coast
- UK Parliament: Faversham and Mid Kent

Brogdale is a hamlet in Kent, England, immediately south of the M2 motorway, 2 miles (3.2 km) south of Faversham. It is one of several hamlets making up the civil parish of Ospringe and is in the Borough of Swale. Its western half is in the Kent Downs Area of Outstanding Natural Beauty.

== History ==
Brogdale was once called Brokedale. This name is shared with the family of John de Brokedale, its lords of the manor of the early middle ages. After no Brokedale sons or other male-line issue remaining, the manor was owned by John Clerk – living in Brogdale in 1383. In 1734, the manor was owned by John Knowler, Mayor of Faversham.

On 10 August 2003 the temperature at Brogdale reached 38.5 °C (101.3 °F), once a record for the United Kingdom.

== Farm ==
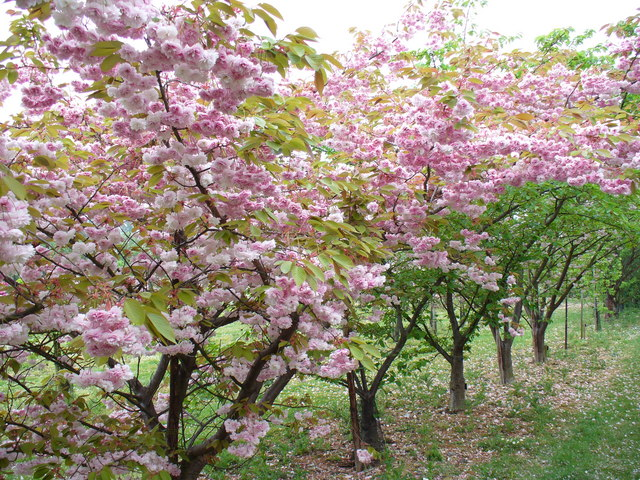
Flowering cherries at the National Fruit Collection

Brogdale Farm is home to the National Fruit Collection, one of the largest collections of fruit trees and plants in the world. Spread over 150-acre (61 ha) it hosts the collection since it moved from Wisley in 1952. In the 1980s, the Government cut funding to the site, with closure threatened by March 1990. In response, the Brogdale Horticultural Trust took over co-ownership of the farm with Wye College. It has been the home of Faversham miniature railway since 2001.

The farm runs regular fruit-themed festivals throughout the summer and autumn:

- the Cherry Festival in July
- the Cider Festival in August
- the Apple Festival in October.

During the fairs, visitors can explore the orchards and several experts give talks on the produce.
