= National Fruit Collection =

Collection of fruit cultivars

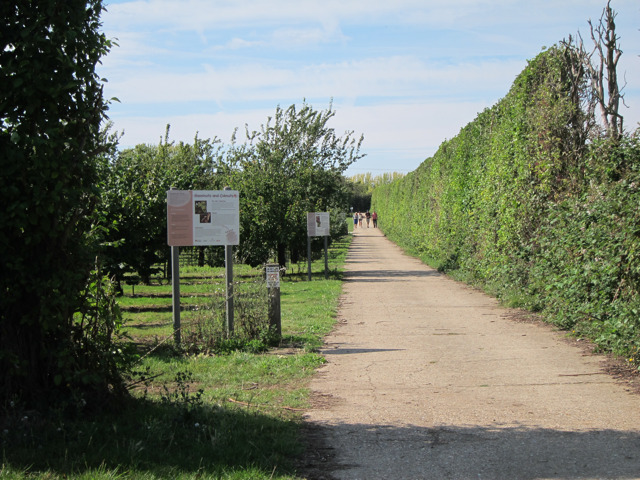
- Orchards at Brogdale Farm

- Location within Kent
- Location: Brogdale, Kent, England
- Coordinates: 51°18′01″N 0°52′45″E
- Area: 150 acres (61 ha)
- Owner: Department for Environment, Food and Rural Affairs
- Manager: University of Reading
- Plants: > 3,500 varieties
- Website: www.nationalfruitcollection.org.uk

The United Kingdom's National Fruit Collection is one of the largest collections of fruit trees and plants in the world. Over 2,040 varieties of apple, 502 of pear, 350 of plum, 322 of cherry and smaller collections of bush fruits, nuts and grapes are grown, in 150 acres (61 ha) of orchards.

It has been curated and maintained at Brogdale Farm, Brogdale, Kent since 1952 and is owned by the Department for Environment, Food and Rural Affairs (Defra). The University of Reading took over day-to-day maintenance of the collection in 2008.

The collection includes two trees or bushes of each variety, in case one is lost.

== See also ==
- Heirloom plant
- List of botanical gardens in the United Kingdom
- National Plant Collection
