= Harry Batterbee =

British civil servant (1880–1976)

Batterbee in 1926.

Sir Harry Fagg Batterbee GCMG KCVO (19 September 1880 – 25 August 1976) was a prominent British civil servant and diplomat and the first British High Commissioner to New Zealand.

== Early life ==
Batterbee was born in 1880 in Faversham, Kent in his parents' house at 62 Newton Road. His father, Napoleon Batterbee, born in Lambeth, London, was the son of a compositor, and had come to Faversham in 1859 to teach at the District National Schools, which reportedly had a Europe-wide reputation for its excellent premises and progressive methods. Harry's mother, Sarah Elizabeth (née Fagg), was from a family of local grocers.

In 1890, Harry started his education at Faversham Grammar School (now Queen Elizabeth's Grammar School, Faversham) and from there won a scholarship to Hertford College, Oxford. His stature, standing 6 ft 4 in, lent itself to an excellent sporting reputation.

== Career ==
Batterbee was a career civil servant. He entered the Civil Service after graduating eventually specialising in handling Government relations with the Dominions of the British Empire. His diplomatic career began in 1905 in the Colonial Office in London. He was the private secretary to Walter Long MP, Secretary of State for the Colonies, during the First World War and during the 1920s he was political secretary for two major Imperial tours. The first tour was the 1923-24 'Empire Cruise' of a battle squadron of Royal Navy vessels led by HMS Hood; the second was the 1927 Duke of York's tour of Australia and New Zealand. He was appointed KCVO (Knight Commander of the Royal Victorian Order) after this tour. At this time he was placed in a new Whitehall department as one of the original members of the Dominions Office. In 1930 he became the Assistant Permanent Undersecretary of State for Dominion Affairs to his brother-in-law and fellow alumnus of Hertford College, Oxford, Sir Edward Harding with whom he served until 1939 (Batterbee was married to Harding's sister).

He and Harding wielded considerable influence from this office. In both 1930 and 1937 Batterbee acted as deputy secretary at the Imperial Conferences held in London; the latter of which was the last of its kind. In addition he carried out sensitive and largely unreported missions, such as to Newfoundland in 1933, after its government had collapsed under the weight of a severe financial crisis leading the British authorities to resume control of its affairs.

During this period he negotiated with Éamon de Valera, the Prime Minister of Ireland which was then known still as a Dominion. Valera strenuously worked towards gaining full independence and at one point Batterbee tried to stop British plans to impose import duties on Irish farm produce. Although he failed in the short term, duties were lifted after a couple of years. Domestically, Sir Harry reportedly played an important part in resolving the crisis that arose when King Edward VIII was advised that he should abdicate if he wished to pursue his plans to marry Mrs Simpson.

In 1939 Harding was appointed the British High Commissioner to South Africa and at the same time Batterbee took up office as the first British High Commissioner to New Zealand having been appointed as such on 27 July 1938. His appointment eased relations with New Zealand which was increasingly unwilling to use the Governor as an intermediary between its own government and that of the United Kingdom. The Second World War broke out soon afterwards, and given its reach into the Pacific, it was not until its conclusion that Batterbee was finally able to retire. Batterbee was able to maintain a long-cultured network of correspondents even in wartime conditions where telegrams were largely restricted to matters of the highest urgency. His correspondents included Whitehall mandarins, fellow High Commissioners and soon-to-be Ambassadors, family and friends, ordinary citizens of the Empire.

== Later life ==
Sir Harry retired from the Civil Service in 1945 and began a period that was to last almost as long as his working life. He became Chairman of the British Antarctic Survey and the Batterbee Mountains in Antarctica were named after him. He also became a governor of his old Faversham school, and from 1961 to 1967 was chairman of the governors. He moved back to the town of his birth and joined the Faversham Society where he was instrumental in the struggle to avert Kent County Council plans to give the town an inner ring road.

On 3 December 1961 Sir Harry was driving on the Guildford to Horsham road at Bucks Green. He went on to the wrong side of the road and hit a group of cyclists from the Clarence Wheelers cycling club. Several were injured and two subsequently died. The case went to court on 23 January 1962 and Sir Harry was charged with careless driving. He was fined £10 and order to pay costs of £25 5s 6d. He was disqualified from driving until he passed his driving test, but it was said that he did not propose to drive again.

He died in 1976 and was buried at Faversham Parish Church in September 1976.

== See also ==
- List of high commissioners of the United Kingdom to New Zealand

Diplomatic posts
Preceded by None position created in 1939	British High Commissioner to New Zealand; 1939–1945	Succeeded by Sir Patrick Duff
