= Faversham =

Market town in Kent, England

Coordinates: 51.3177°N 0.8928°E

- Market town
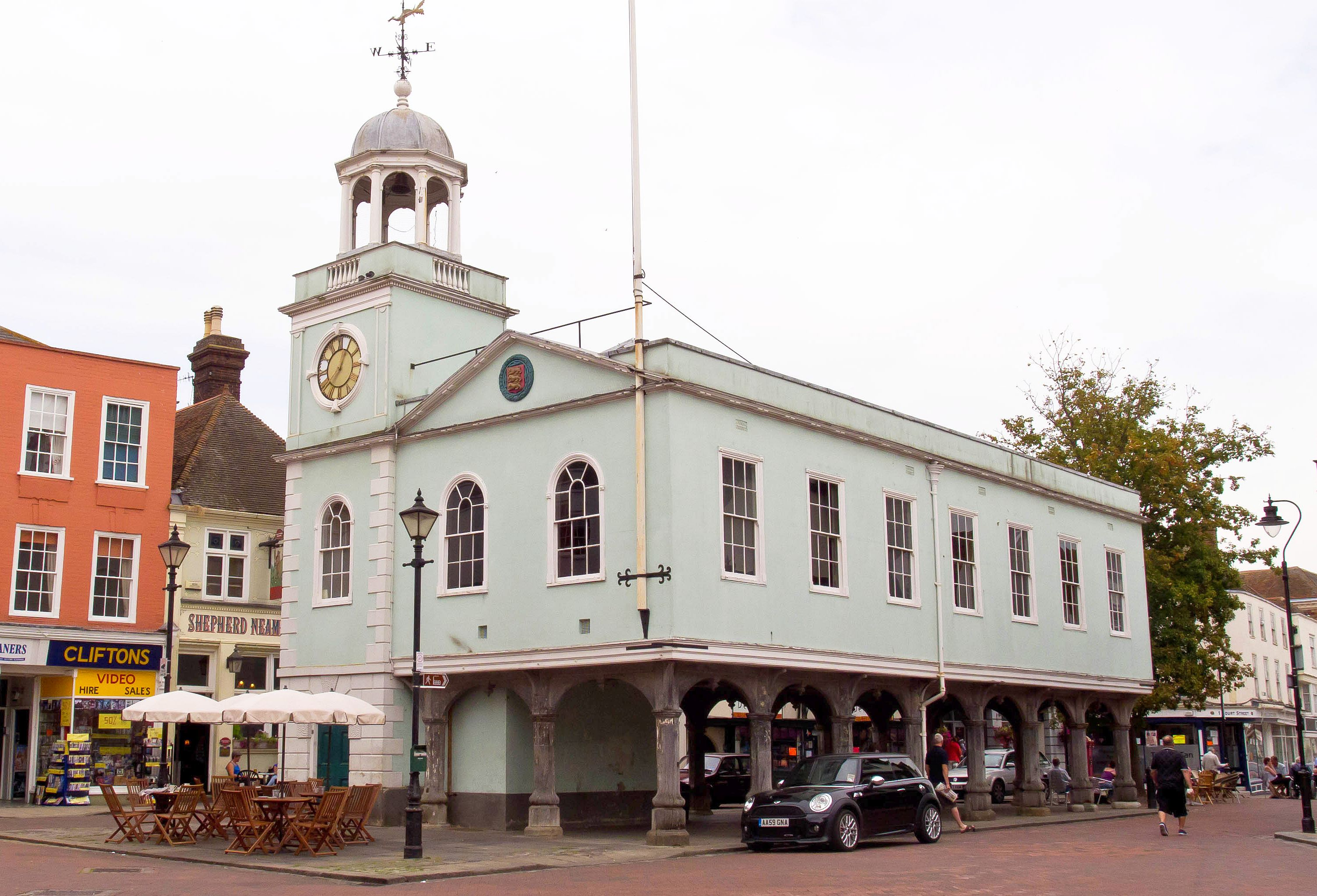
- Faversham Guildhall and Market

- Location within Kent
- Population: 20,936 (2021 Census)
- OS grid reference: TR015615
  - London: 48 miles (77 km)
- Civil parish: Faversham
- District: Swale
- Shire county: Kent
- Region: South East
- Country: England
- Sovereign state: United Kingdom
- Post town: FAVERSHAM
- Postcode district: ME13
- Dialling code: 01795
- Police: Kent
- Fire: Kent
- Ambulance: South East Coast
- UK Parliament: Faversham and Mid Kent

Faversham (/ˈfævərʃəm/) is a market town in Kent, England. It is located 8 miles (13 km) from Sittingbourne, 48 miles (77 km) from London and 10 miles (16 km) from Canterbury; it lies next to the Swale, a strip of sea separating mainland Kent from the Isle of Sheppey in the Thames Estuary. The town is close to the A2, used by the Romans and the Anglo-Saxons, which follows an ancient British trackway now known as Watling Street.

There is evidence of Mesolithic and Neolithic human activity in and around the town. Settlement at Faversham precedes the Roman conquest as indicated by a Late Iron Age Belgic farmstead discovered under the playing fields of Queen Elizabeth's Grammar School. The farmstead was located in the broader region which Ptolemy later associated with the Cantii. The site became a Roman villa. The Maison Dieu holds evidence of Roman settlement near Ospringe in the south-west of the town, this makes it a plausible candidate for Durolevum - a settlement mentioned in the Antonine Itinerary - which sat on the Watling Street between Rutupiae (Richborough) and Londinium (London).

The modern name is of Old English origin, probably meaning "the metal-worker's village". It is mentioned in the Domesday Book of 1086 as Favreshant. The Barons of Faversham were using three lions passant guardant – the royal arms of England - as the arms for the town during the reign of the Plantagenet king Edward I. The town's medieval corporate seal bore the legend: 'Since I bear arms for the King without charge, I am a free port' (Regis ut arma rego libera portus ego). The town was favoured by King Stephen, who established Faversham Abbey, which survived until the Dissolution of the Monasteries in 1538. Subsequently, the town became an important seaport and established itself as a centre for brewing, and the Shepherd Neame Brewery, founded in 1698, remains a significant major employer.

The town was also the centre of the explosives industry between the 17th and early 20th century, declining after an accident in 1916 which killed over 100 workers. This coincided with a revival of the shipping industry in the town. Faversham has a number of landmarks, with several historic churches including St Mary of Charity, Faversham Parish Church, the Maison Dieu and Faversham Recreation Ground. Faversham Market has been established for over 900 years and is still based in the town centre. There are good road and rail links, including a route to the High Speed 1 line at Ebbsfleet for fast services to London.

== Toponymy ==
The name Faversham, first attested in 811 as Fefresham, derives from Old English. The second element is the Old English word hām ('settlement'), which is common in place-names. The first element, however, is unique; it has been inferred to derive from an otherwise lost Old English word fæfere ('smith'), which in turn derived from the Latin faber ('craftsman, smith'). Thus the name once meant 'smith's homestead'. Given its Latin derivation, however, the name may have referred specifically to Roman smiths.

== History ==
=== Early history ===
Late sixth century brooches discovered at King's Field; currently held by the British Museum

Faversham was established as a settlement before the Roman conquest of Britain. The Romans established several towns in Kent including Faversham, with traffic through the Saxon Shore ports of Reculver, Richborough, Dover and Lympne converging on Canterbury before heading up Watling Street to London. The town was less than 10 miles (16 km) from Canterbury, and consequently Faversham had become established on this road network by 50 AD following the initial conquest by Claudius in 43 AD. Numerous remains of Roman buildings have been discovered in and around Faversham, including under St Mary of Charity Church where coins and urns were discovered during reconstruction of the western tower in 1794. In 2013, the remains of a 2,000-year-old Roman theatre, able to accommodate some 12,000 people, were discovered at a hillside near the town. The cockpit-style outdoor auditorium, the first of its kind found in Britain, was a style the Romans used elsewhere in their empire on the Continent.

There is archaeological evidence to suggest that Faversham was a summer capital for the kings of Kent. The King's Field Treasure indicates that a significant burial site was located in the south-west of the town during the late sixth and early seventh centuries. The cemetery was located roughly between Stone Street to the north, London Road to the south, the Mall to the east and St Ann's Road and Upper St Ann's Road to the west. The site was uncovered during the construction of the Chatham–Dover railway line in 1858. Artefacts from King's Field are now dispersed among several collections, notably the British Museum in London, the Metropolitan Museum of Art in New York and the Ashmolean Museum in Oxford alongside other British collections. Excavations beneath the Market Inn in 2018–19 unearthed a probable sunken-featured building (SFB), which provides evidence for contemporaneous settlement to the east of the King's Field burial site. This is the first secure archaeological evidence of early medieval settlement in Faversham.

The presence of Frankish pottery at the Market Inn settlement, together with Frankish-style grave goods at King's Field, suggests close connections between early medieval Faversham and the broader Merovingian world. The marriage of Æthelberht of Kent to the Frankish princess Bertha of Kent (great-granddaughter of Clovis I) provides a broader historical context for the close ties between the early medieval Kingdom of Kent and Francia, though the exact nature of this relationship is debated. Faversham was held in royal demesne in 811, and is further cited in a charter granted by Coenwulf, the King of Mercia. Coenwulf described the town as 'the King's little town of Fefresham', while it was recorded in the Domesday Book as Favreshant. The town had established itself as a seaport by the Middle Ages, and became part of the Confederation of the Cinque Ports in the 13th century, providing a vessel to Dover. The Gough Map of Britain, printed in 1360, shows the Swale as an important shipping channel for trade.

=== Middle Ages, Tudors and Stuarts ===
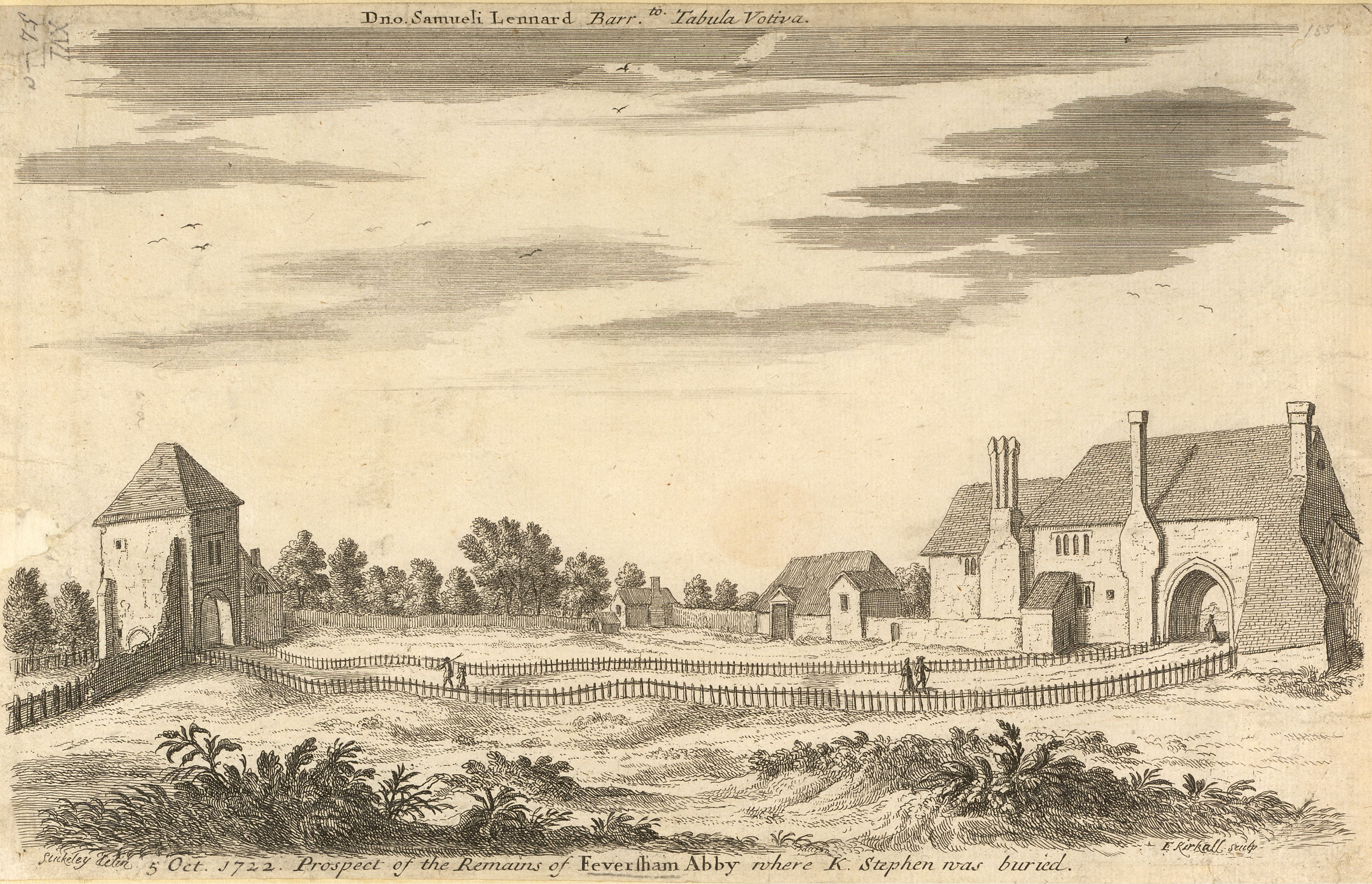
Faversham Abbey, sketched by William Stukeley in 1722, was established by King Stephen in 1148. He was buried there in 1154.

The manor was recorded as Terra Regis, meaning it was part of the ancient royal estates. King Stephen gave it to his chief lieutenant, William of Ypres, but soon made him swap it with Lillechurch (now Higham) so that the manor of Faversham could form part of the endowment of Faversham Abbey. Stephen established the abbey in 1148, and is buried there with his consort Matilda of Boulogne, and his son, Eustace, the Count of Boulogne. Stephen favoured the town because of the abbey, and so it was historically important during his reign. King John tried to give the church to Simon of Wells in 1201, but it was owned by the monks of St Augustine's Abbey at Canterbury, who appealed to Rome and the request was denied. Abbey Street was constructed about this time in order to provide an appropriate approach to the abbey from the town. It still houses timber-framed buildings and has been described as "the finest medieval street in south-east England".

Thomas Culpeper was granted Faversham Abbey by Henry VIII during the Dissolution of the Monasteries in 1538. Most of the abbey was demolished, and the remains of Stephen were rumoured to have been thrown into Faversham Creek. An excavation of the abbey in 1964 uncovered the empty graves. The entrance gates survived the demolition and lasted until the mid-18th century, but otherwise only a small section of outer wall survived. The abbey's masonry was taken to Calais to reinforce defence of the town, then in British possession, against the French army. In 1539, the ground upon which the abbey had stood, along with nearby land, passed to Sir Thomas Cheney, Lord Warden of the Cinque Ports.

Among the few surviving buildings of Faversham Abbey are the two barns at Abbey Farm. Minor Barn was built about 1425; Major Barn, the larger of the two, dates from 1476. Next to the barns is the Abbey Farmhouse, part of which dates from the 14th century. The Abbey Guest house, on the east side of the Abbey's Outer Gateway, has survived as Arden's House. This house, now a private residence in Abbey Street, was the location of the murder of Thomas Arden in 1551. The Faversham Almshouses were founded and endowed by Thomas Manfield in 1614, with additional houses built by Henry Wright in 1823.

The poor quality of roads in the Middle Ages meant travel by sea was an important transport corridor. Richard Tylman (or Tillman), mayor in 1581, expanded the port at Faversham, building two wharfs. He became a key figure in exporting corn, wheat and malt to London from the town.

Several notable people in the Middle Ages had origins in Faversham. Haymo of Faversham was born in Faversham and later moved to Paris to join the Franciscans, becoming the "Aristotelian of Aristotelians". Simon of Faversham was born in the town in the middle of the 13th century and later became Chancellor of the University of Oxford in 1304. The notorious pirate Jack Ward is believed to have been born in Faversham about 1553. John Wilson, lutenist and teacher was born in Faversham in 1595 who was the principal composer for the King's Men and a professor of music at Oxford. There is now a plaque at the site of the house in Abbey Street where he was born.

Faversham also had notable visitors during this period. Queen Mary and King Philip visited the town in July 1557 en route to Dover. Queen Elizabeth I visited Faversham in September 1573 during a summer tour of Kent, accompanied by Lord Burghley, the Lord Treasurer. Charles II passed the town on his way from Dover to London, on his way to be crowned.

=== Faversham's role against the Spanish Armada ===
As a member of the Cinque Ports, Faversham sent a 38–ton vessel, the Hazarde, with a crew of 30 men to engage the Armada in 1588. Faversham collectively paid £221 for fitting the ship and £110 for gunpowder and shot. The Hazarde was returned after service to its owners Abrahame Snoode and Edward Buddle and docked at the quay on Faversham Creek. The old town warehouse, used by the Sea Cadets since 1940, is named Training Ship Hazard (T.S. Hazard) after the Hazarde.

=== Explosives industry ===
A gunpowder plant had been established around 1573 in Faversham. The town had a stream which could be dammed at intervals to provide power for watermills. It became known as the Home Works in the 18th century and was nationalised in 1759. By the 19th century, the site stretched for around a mile along the waterfront. A second explosive works was established at Oare to the north-west of town in the late 17th century, with the Marsh Works following in 1786. Towards the end of the 19th century, two new factories were built alongside the Swale to manage production of TNT and cordite. Faversham developed six explosive factories, and from 1874 to 1919, the town was the centre of the explosives industry in the UK.

The first production of guncotton took place in the Marsh Works in 1847. Due to a lack of experience with production methods, an explosion took place soon after work started, with several fatalities. On 2 April 1916, an explosion occurred at one of the Swale factories in Uplees after sparks from a chimney ignited the works containing around 150 tonnes of high explosives. The incident killed over 100 people, which led to decline of the explosives industry in the town. Later accounts suggested that had the incident not happened on a Sunday, there would have been many more casualties.

All three gunpowder factories shut in 1934 due to the impending threat of World War II. Production was moved to Ardeer in Ayrshire, Scotland, and the munition industry around Faversham is now extinct. The town is now a harbour and market community; old sail-powered Thames barges are repaired, rebuilt and moored along the creekside.

=== Industrial Revolution and beyond ===
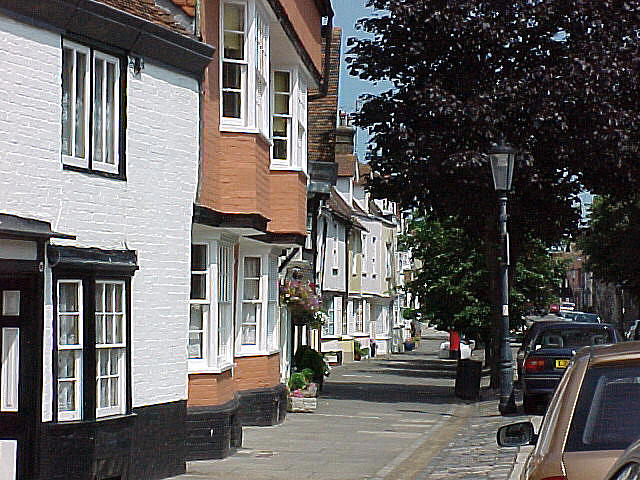
Abbey Street was saved from demolition in the 1950s; it includes many historic houses

Kent is the centre of hop-growing in England, being centred on nearby Canterbury and Faversham has been the home of several breweries. The Shepherd Neame Brewery was officially founded in 1698, though brewing activities in Faversham pre-date this. The brewery claims to be the oldest in Britain and continues to be family-owned. The Rigden brewery was founded in the early 18th century by Edward Rigden. It subsequently merged with the Canterbury-based George Beer in 1922 to become George Beer & Rigden before being purchased by the Maidstone based Fremlin's. Whitbread bought out Fremlin's in 1967, and closed the Faversham brewery in 1990. The site is now a Tesco superstore. Shepherd Neame remains a significant regional brewer despite a decline in consumption of traditional bitter beer, producing around 230,000 barrels a year. It now also makes India Pale Ale under licence. Lieutenant-General Sir Philip Neame, recipient of the Victoria Cross, was born in Faversham and a memorial to him was placed in the town centre in 2014.

A shipyard was established in Faversham by James Pollock & Sons (Shipbuilders) in 1916 at the request of Lord Fisher, the First Lord of The Admiralty, for manufacturing barges for landing craft. Faversham already had a tradition of shipbuilding, and it soon became a major contributor to markets throughout the world, producing vessels such as Molliette and Violette, both constructed of concrete. Over 1,200 ships were built and launched from Faversham between 1916 and 1969.

Faversham Market is still held in the town centre. It is now the oldest street market in Kent, dating back over 900 years. Monthly markets are also held in Preston Street and Court Street.

Having been an important thoroughfare since the 12th century, Abbey Street went into decline around the start of the 20th. Some buildings on the street adjoining Quay Lane were demolished in 1892 and much of the entire street was intended for demolition as recently as the 1950s, until intervention from the Society for the Protection of Ancient Buildings. Local people began a determined fight to restore and preserve the area.

=== Archaeology ===
In May 2019, the Kent Archaeological Field School uncovered a 150 by 50 feet (46 by 15 m) Roman building at Abbey Farm. According to Dr Paul Wilkinson, the building contained broken stone walls covering huge amounts of box flue tiles, which were used to direct hot air up the indoor walls, glazed terracotta floors, an untouched underfloor with hypocaust heating, and tons of ceramic roof tiles. Although the plaster painted from these walls was mostly white, plaster walls coloured with green, red and yellow panels were found in the hot sauna room on the north side of the building.

In 2009, the Faversham Society Archaeology Research Group (FSARG) uncovered evidence of the town's medieval tannery in the back gardens of Tanner Street. Evidence of Anglo-Saxon occupation was discovered during the Hunt the Saxons project between 2005 and 2007 and a high-status rubbish pit excavated in the "Searching for the Kings Manor" project in 2017–2019.

== Governance ==
Faversham's arms

A charter was granted to the Mayor, Jurats and Freemen of the Town of Faversham in 1546, and regranted in 1685; the town council was established under the Municipal Corporations Act 1835.

The parliamentary constituency of Faversham was created for the 1885 general election; it was replaced by the new constituencies of Sittingbourne and Sheppey, and Faversham and Mid Kent at the 1997 general election. The town has been represented by a MP from the Conservative Party other than between 1945 and 1970. Since 2015, the constituency's MP has been the Conservative Helen Whately.

The town lies within the Swale local government district, containing four electoral wards: Abbey, Davington Priory, St Ann's and Watling.

Faversham was a large ancient parish, which included rural areas and surrounding villages. It became a civil parish in 1866, but it was divided into Faversham Within and Faversham Without in 1894. In 1935, the civil parish of Faversham was recreated, and absorbed the civil parishes of Faversham Within, Davington, Preston Within, North Preston Without and South Preston Without, and parts of the civil parishes of Faversham Without, Luddenham and Ospringe.

The arms of Faversham Town Council, which holds its meetings at Faversham Guildhall, are based on the Royal Arms of England, alluding to the town's regal history.

== Geography ==
The town lies roughly equidistant between Sittingbourne and Canterbury. It lies 48 miles (77 km) south-east of London, 18 miles (29 km) east of Maidstone and 14 miles (23 km) north from Ashford. Nearby villages include Oare across Oare Creek to the north, Luddenham, Mockbeggar and Ospringe.

Geographically, Faversham sits at a boundary between marshland to the north and a mixture of brick earth, gravel and chalk to the south which leads into the North Downs. Faversham Creek connects the town to the Swale that separates mainland Kent from the Isle of Sheppey. The surrounding area is part of the South Swale Nature Reserve, popular with wildfowl and wading birds. The South Swale Nature Reserve is managed by the Environment Agency and Natural England The coastline around Faversham is a by-product of the changes to sea level around Britain since the end of the last ice age. During Roman Britain and into the first millennium, the Faversham coast was a large estuary with Oare and Graveney being peninsulas. Land reclamation during the Middle Ages, which closed the River Wantsum and connected the Isle of Thanet to mainland Kent, resulted in less tidal waters reaching Faversham. This led to the gradual silting up of estuaries; Faversham Creek and its tributaries have been reduced from 1,378 acres (558 ha) to 43 acres (17 ha). To stop the creek silting up completely and making navigation impossible, a number of sluices have been installed since the 16th century.

=== Climate ===
Faversham formerly held the weather record for the highest ever UK temperature, which reached 38.5 °C (101.3 °F) in 2003. This was the first time the recorded temperature had ever exceeded 100 °F (38 °C) reliably in the UK. This record had stood for nearly 16 years, but was beaten by 0.2°C (0.4°F) with a temperature of 38.7 °C (101.7 °F) recorded in the Cambridge University Botanic Garden on 25 July 2019. Faversham still holds the record for the highest maximum temperature in the UK for August, with the previous record in 2003.

The town's minimum temperature of −16.1 °C (3.0 °F) was set on 19 January 1966 and the maximum of 39.0 °C (102.2 °F) was set on 19 July 2022.

Climate data for Faversham (1991–2020) (extremes 1959-2023)
Month	Jan	Feb	Mar	Apr	May	Jun	Jul	Aug	Sep	Oct	Nov	Dec	Year
Record high °C (°F)	16.8 (62.2)	18.6 (65.5)	21.7 (71.1)	25.8 (78.4)	30.0 (86.0)	32.2 (90.0)	39.0 (102.2)	38.5 (101.3)	33.5 (92.3)	29.0 (84.2)	18.3 (64.9)	15.9 (60.6)	39.0 (102.2)
Mean daily maximum °C (°F)	7.9 (46.2)	8.4 (47.1)	11.0 (51.8)	14.2 (57.6)	17.3 (63.1)	20.5 (68.9)	23.1 (73.6)	23.1 (73.6)	19.6 (67.3)	15.4 (59.7)	11.1 (52.0)	8.5 (47.3)	15.1 (59.2)
Daily mean °C (°F)	5.1 (41.2)	5.3 (41.5)	7.3 (45.1)	9.7 (49.5)	12.6 (54.7)	15.6 (60.1)	18.1 (64.6)	18.1 (64.6)	15.2 (59.4)	11.8 (53.2)	8.1 (46.6)	5.6 (42.1)	11.1 (52.0)
Mean daily minimum °C (°F)	2.3 (36.1)	2.2 (36.0)	3.6 (38.5)	5.2 (41.4)	8.0 (46.4)	10.8 (51.4)	13.0 (55.4)	13.1 (55.6)	10.7 (51.3)	8.2 (46.8)	5.0 (41.0)	2.7 (36.9)	7.1 (44.8)
Record low °C (°F)	−16.1 (3.0)	−15.1 (4.8)	−8.9 (16.0)	−4.6 (23.7)	−2.2 (28.0)	0.0 (32.0)	3.9 (39.0)	3.9 (39.0)	1.5 (34.7)	−2.8 (27.0)	−6.3 (20.7)	−10.6 (12.9)	−16.1 (3.0)
Average precipitation mm (inches)	64.4 (2.54)	50.0 (1.97)	39.2 (1.54)	44.6 (1.76)	49.6 (1.95)	45.3 (1.78)	43.3 (1.70)	57.0 (2.24)	55.3 (2.18)	79.9 (3.15)	74.8 (2.94)	71.9 (2.83)	675.3 (26.59)
Average precipitation days (≥ 1.0 mm)	11.6	9.5	7.4	8.4	8.0	7.5	7.2	8.1	7.8	11.5	11.2	12.1	110.2
Mean monthly sunshine hours	59.1	81.1	123.2	183.5	214.3	219.0	228.1	219.2	162.3	123.7	67.7	56.3	1,737.3
Source 1: Met Office
Source 2: Starlings Roost Weather

=== Demographics ===
At the 2021 census, Faversham had a population of 20,936, an increase of 19,316 from the 2011 UK census. The population figures were split into: Abbey (6,084), Davington Priory (2,593), St Ann's (5,268) and Watling (5,371). A total of 9,770 people were employed within the town, split into: retail (1,416), education (1,239), health and social work (1,200), construction (836) and manufacturing (692). 17,868 of the town's residents were born in England.

== Education ==
There has been a school in Faversham since the twelfth century; archival evidence has shown this had become a grammar school by 1420. In 1526, John Cole, chaplain to Henry VII and Henry VIII and Warden of All Souls College, Oxford, established a new grammar school on the estate of Ewell Farm. The property fell into disuse after the dissolution of the abbey, and a replacement grammar school was not established until 1587. The Wreights School, a commercial school, was founded in 1856, while a corresponding girls' school, the Gibbs School was established in 1883. The two boys' schools were amalgamated in 1920, forming Queen Elizabeth's Grammar School. The current school dates from 1967, when the boys and girls schools were merged, forming the first co-educational grammar school in Kent.

The Abbey School is a Business and Enterprise Academy formed in September 1983 by the amalgamation of the Ethelbert Road Boys School and Lady Capel School for Girls. It has over 1,000 pupils and is located in the south of the town, beside the A2 London Road.

The Faversham Institute was founded in 1862 in East Street. Membership was open to everybody with a small subscription fee; it consisted of meeting rooms, halls and a library. Exams could be studied for and sat at the Institute; it published a monthly journal until December 1919. After a local government reorganisation, the Institute was demolished in 1979.

The library is managed by Kent County Council; the current building on Newton Road was opened in February 1973.

== Transport ==
=== Railway ===
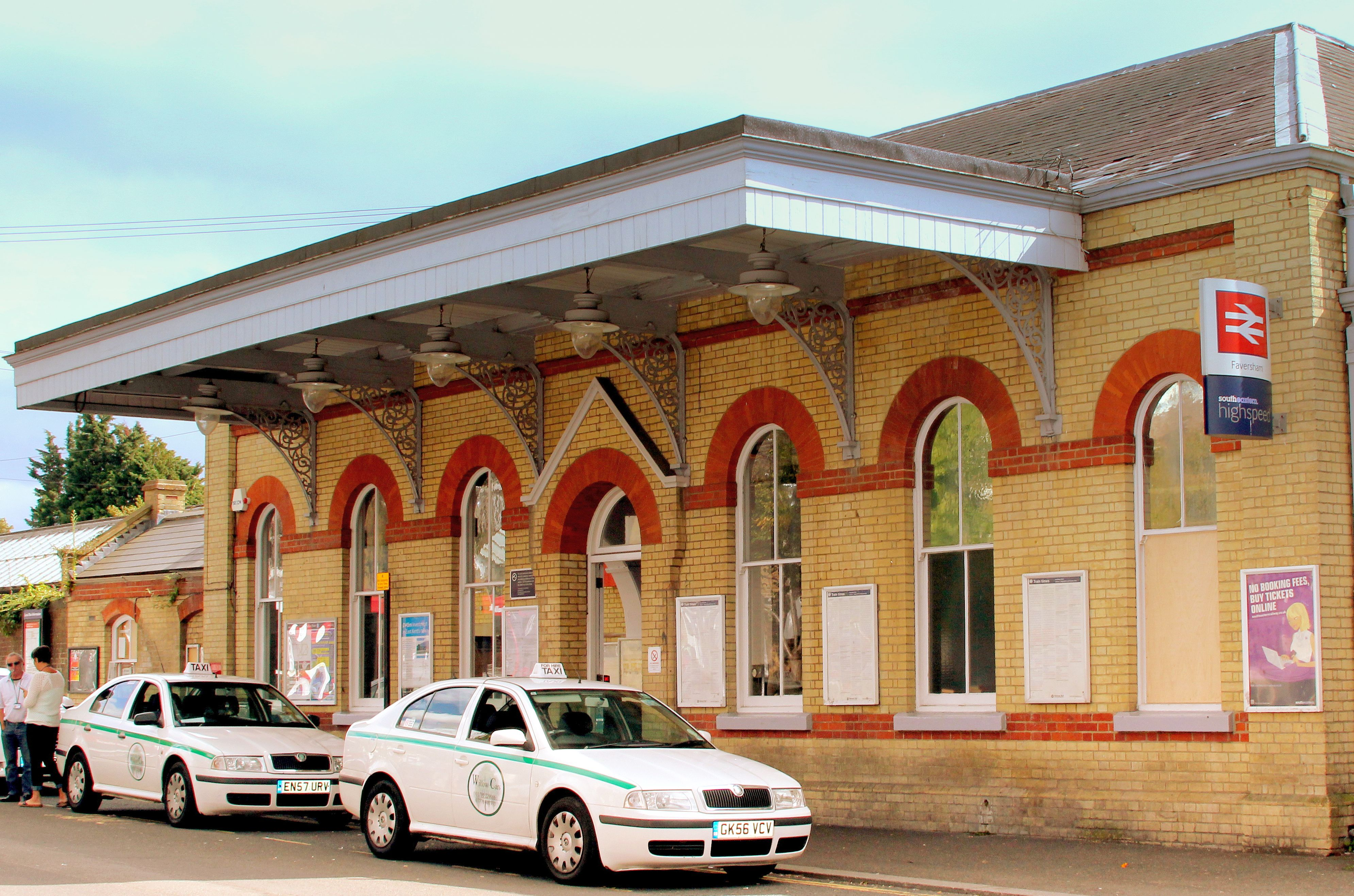
Faversham station was rebuilt in 1898 and is listed Grade II

Faversham railway station is served by Southeastern, which links the town with:

- London, terminating at either Victoria or St Pancras
- Dover Priory, via Canterbury East
- Ramsgate, via Margate.

High Speed 1 services can be boarded by changing at Ebbsfleet International.

=== Roads ===
Faversham is close to the A2 road, a historically important route from London to Canterbury and the Channel ports. The route began as an ancient trackway which the Romans later paved and marked as Iter II (Second Route) on the Antonine Itinerary. The Anglo-Saxons named it Wæcelinga Stræt (Watling Street) and it was marked as such by Matthew Paris in his Schema Britannie in 1250. The road continued to be an important thoroughfare, and is shown next to Faversham on Philip Symonson's map of Kent published in 1596.

The A2 road still carries traffic between Sittingbourne and Canterbury, though London bound traffic now takes the M2 motorway. The A299 Thanet Way provides access to the Isle of Thanet and the A251 Ashford Road is a local road to Ashford. The Mall is one of the main roads to the town centre from the A2. It was built in the late 18th century as a dignified approach road, and attracted development of villas along its length.

=== Buses ===
Bus services are operated primarily by Arriva Southern Counties and Stagecoach in East Kent; routes link the town with Ashford, Canterbury, Sittingbourne and Whitstable.

== Community facilities ==
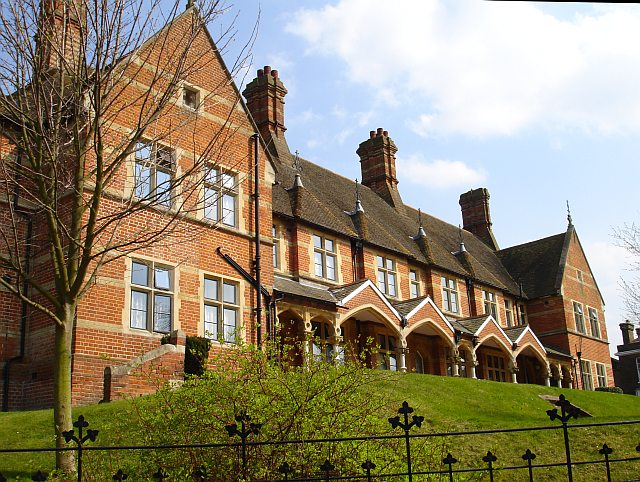
Almshouses built using the bequest of Henry Wreight

Faversham Recreation Ground (locally known as Faversham Rec, or simply The Rec) is to the east of the town centre. It was established in 1860 by a local solicitor, Henry Wreight, who bequeathed his £70,000 estate, including two almshouses housing 70 people, to the town in order that locals would have an area to enjoy. The rec has been preserved and is now run by the town's Municipal Charities. A bandstand was added towards the end of the 19th century, and sporting events began to be held on the rec. A week-long party was held to celebrate the Coronation of Queen Elizabeth II in 1953, which drew praise from Princess Andrei of Russia, then living near Faversham. A 50-year extension on the lease, signed in 2010, confirmed its continued use by the public.

The Oare Gunpowder Works, close to the scene of the 1916 explosion at Uplees, is now a country park and nature reserve open to the public. The Oare Marshes are an important reserve for birds. There is an information centre near the site of the former Harty ferry over the Swale to the Isle of Sheppey. Remains of the process houses and other mill leats have been conserved, and various trails are signposted. An early 20th century electric-powered gunpowder mill, which was transferred to Ardeer in 1934, has been repatriated to the country park and is on display. The 18th-century works bell has also been repatriated and is on display at Faversham's Fleur de Lis Heritage Centre. Stonebridge Pond, on the site of the original Chart Mills, was donated to Swale Borough Council in the early 1980s. It is now a haven for wading birds.

== Landmarks ==
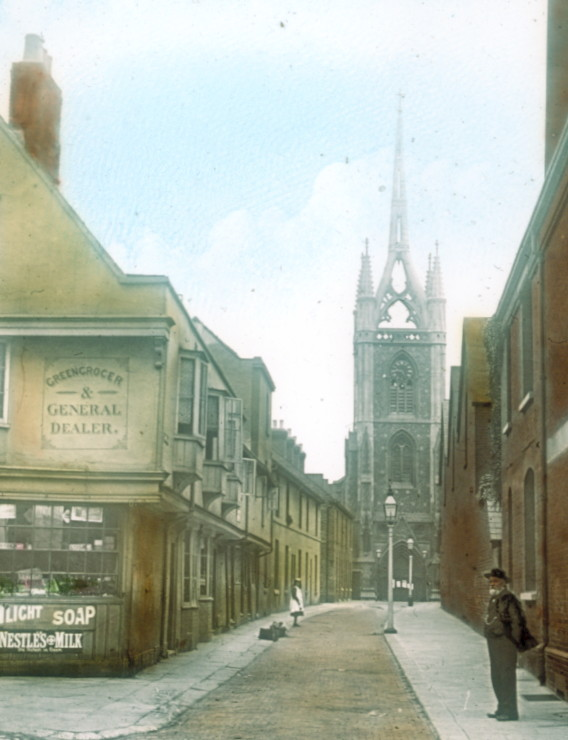
St Mary of Charity, late 1800s

Faversham Stone Chapel (in Norton, Buckland and Stone) is the remains of the Church of Our Lady of Elwarton, an ancient monument managed by The Faversham Society. It was originally used for pagan rituals in pre-Roman Britain, and is the only remaining evidence in Britain of a church incorporating a pagan shrine. The building was converted into a church around AD601 when Pope Gregory I encouraged pagan buildings to be converted rather than destroyed. The church has not seen service since the 16th century and was reported as "being in a state of disrepair" and unused since the Reformation.

Although Faversham Abbey was dissolved by Henry VIII the nearby St Mary of Charity, Faversham Parish Church remains, and has been a Grade I listed building since 1950. The first documented evidence of a church in Faversham dates to 1070, when it was recorded in the Domesday Book. A distinctive spire was added around 1794–97 and can be seen from many places around the town. The interior was restored in the mid-19th century by the architect Sir George Gilbert Scott, who redesigned the nave and transepts and added a stone encasing to the spire. The church reputedly contains the remains of King Stephen, which were recovered from Faversham Creek after the dissolution of the abbey. The church holds an altar dedicated to Saints Crispin and Crispinian, who reportedly fled to Faversham in the 3rd century.

St Catherine's Church dates from the Norman period and was extensively restored in the 1860s. The nearby Ospringe Church, to the south-west of town, dates from Norman Britain, aside from a replacement tower built in 1866. The National Shrine of Saint Jude is a Roman Catholic shrine in the Church of Our Lady of Mount Carmel. It was established in 1955 and regularly attracts Christian pilgrims and various tourists. It is part of a number pilgrimage routes from London, Aylesford and Ramsgate.

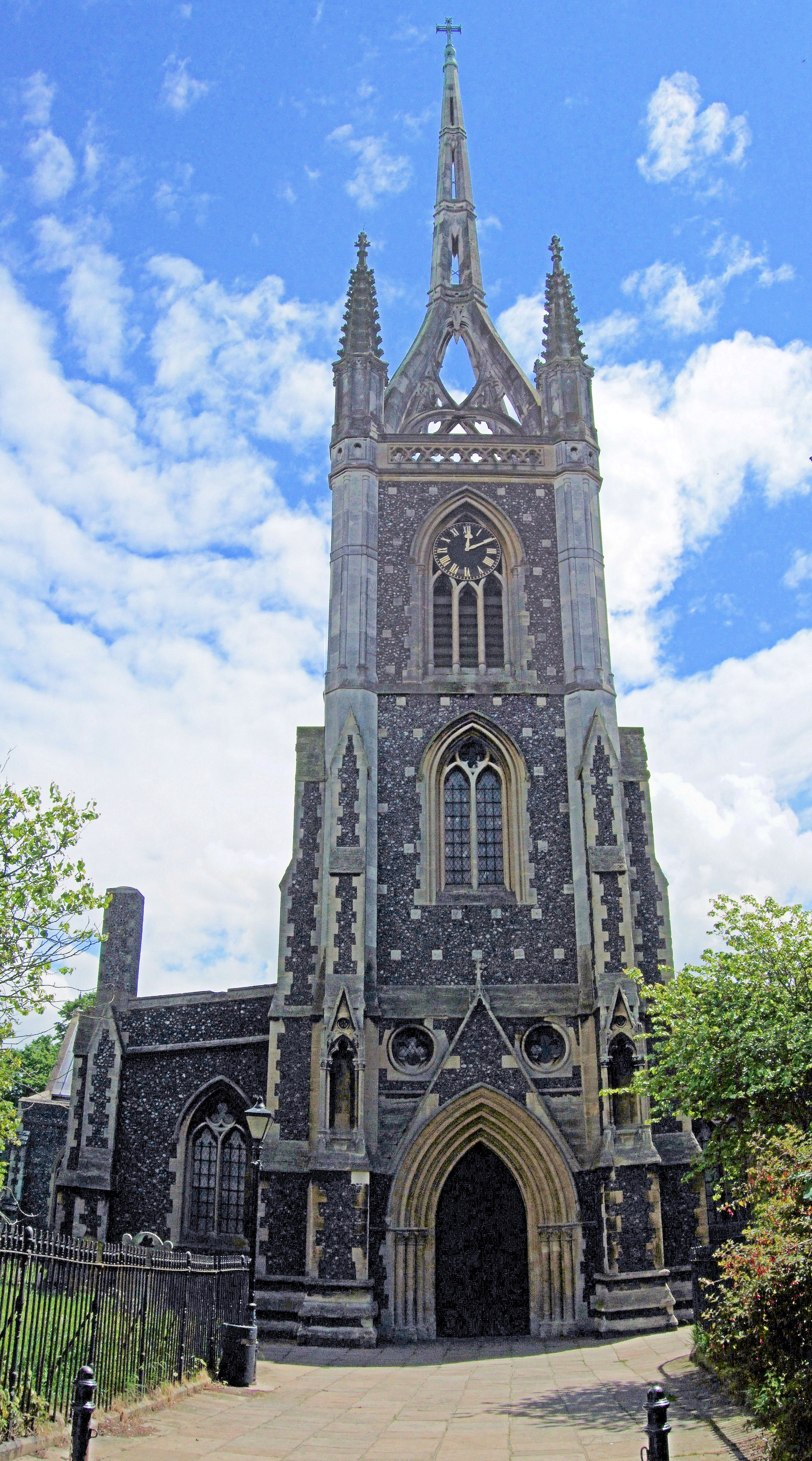
St Mary of Charity Church

The Grade II listed St John the Evangelist church on Upper Brents was built in 1881 by Kirk and Son of Sleaford, It was founded by Mrs Hall of Syndale House, the widow of a gunpowder manufacturer.

The historic central area, especially the part-pedestrian parts between the station and the creek, attracts visitors, who can learn about the town's history and features at the Fleur-de-Lis centre, which provides tourist information and houses a museum. There is still a regular market several days each week in the market square where the Guildhall stands. Nearby streets feature old pubs, almshouses, shops and a growing collection of art galleries and restaurants.

Faversham Cottage Hospital opened in 1887. It was extended in 1922 and included a World War I memorial, which was unveiled by Vice Admiral Hugh Evan-Thomas. The memorial was later adapted to commemorate World War II casualties. In 2014, the memorial became Grade II listed.

Faversham Cemetery opened in 1898. The chapel was designed by Edwin Pover; 73 victims of the 1916 gunpowder explosion are buried in the cemetery, where they are commemorated by the Grade II* listed Faversham Munitions Explosion Memorial. Also interred at the cemetery is the Irish novelist Kate O'Brien.

== Culture ==
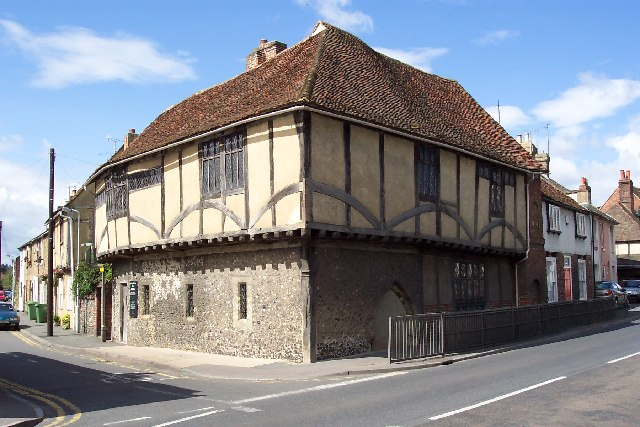
The Maison Dieu lies to the south of the town centre and houses artefacts from Roman Britain

Arden of Feversham is a play about the murder of Thomas Arden written around 1590, possibly by William Shakespeare or Canterbury-born Christopher Marlowe. It gives its name to the modern Arden Theatre in the town, Local theatre groups perform in the theatre as part of the Canterbury Festival each autumn.

The Royal Cinema is based near the town square. It opened in 1936 and is now Grade II listed. It is one of only two mock Tudor cinemas to survive in the UK.

The Faversham Society was established in 1962, and is one of the oldest civic societies in the UK. It owns and manages the Fleur de Lis Heritage Centre as its headquarters. The Centre hosts a large museum depicting the town's history and culture and hosts the town's Visitor Information Centre, including a bookshop.

The Maison Dieu ('House of God'), located on the A2 to the south-west of the town centre, is a hospital, monastery, hostel, retirement home and Royal lodge commissioned by Henry III in 1234 and now in the care of English Heritage. It is now managed by the Maison Dieu Trust and closely associated to the Faversham Society as a museum of Roman artefacts from the surrounding area.

Davington Priory lies to the north-west of the town centre and was founded in the mid 12th century. It is currently owned and occupied by musician and activist Bob Geldof.

Brogdale Farm, to the south of the town centre, has hosted the DEFRA National Fruit Collection since 1954. It has over 2,040 varieties of apple, 502 of pear, 350 of plum, 322 of cherry and smaller collections of bush fruits, nuts and grapes, all grown in 150 acres (61 ha) of orchards. The farm hosts a number of fruit festivals throughout the year, guided tours and activities for schools. It also hosts the nine-inch gauge Faversham miniature railway, which runs through the orchards.

In 2011, it was discovered that the town owns an original version of Magna Carta, potentially worth about £20m, rather than a copy worth only £10,000. In 2015, the copy went on display to the public at the town's Alexander Centre – the first time it had been on display for 715 years. The Magna Carta and other town charters are now on permanent display in 12 Market Place in Faversham.

The 2021 Tamil Film Jagame Thandhiram starring Dhanush was partly filmed in Faversham, including the Iron Wharf.

In August 2023, a copy of a prayer book written by Katharine Parr was found and put on display in the Fleur de Lis Heritage Centre in Faversham; this was the first book printed in English written by a woman.

== Media ==
Local news and television programmes are provided by BBC South East and ITV1 Meridian. Television signals are received from the Dover and Bluebell Hill transmitters as well as a local relay situated to the south west of the town.

The town's local radio stations are BBC Radio Kent, Heart South, Gold, KMFM Canterbury and Radio Faversham, a community-based radio station. The local newspapers are the Faversham Times, the Faversham News and the Faversham Eye.

== Sport ==
Faversham Town F.C. was formed in 1884 and competes in Division One South of the Isthmian League. It has a 2,000-capacity stadium to the south of the town and are the only team, other than the England national football team, to wear the Three Lions badge.

Faversham Ladies Hockey Club currently play in division six of the South East Hockey League, finishing second at the end of the 2023/24 season. Faversham Ladies were the holders of the Mina-Jones trophy, beating neighbours Sittingbourne 2-0 in April 2024. The small ladies team play their home games in nearby Sittingbourne, due to a lack of astro pitches in the town.

The King George V playing fields are all that remain of the Mount Field cricket ground, which hosted a first-class match between Kent and Hampshire in 1876.

== In popular culture ==
Author Russell Hoban repurposes Faversham as "Fathers Ham" in his 1980, post-apocalyptic novel Riddley Walker.

== See also ==
- Buckland-by-Faversham, a parish to the south-west of Faversham
- Hazebrouck, a French town twinned with Faversham
- Listed buildings in Faversham
- South East Faversham, a new settlement proposed by the Duchy of Cornwall.
