= Faversham Guildhall =

Municipal building in Faversham, Kent, England

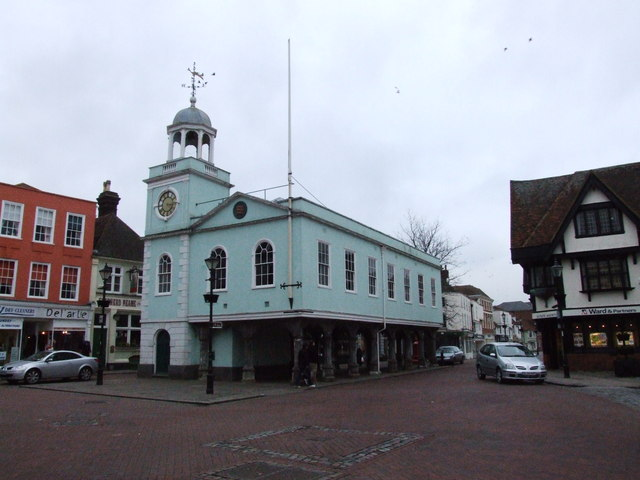
- Faversham Guildhall

- Shown in Kent
- 51.3158°N 0.8911°E
- Location: The Market Place, Faversham

History
- Built: 1574

Site notes
- Architect: Charles Drayson
- Architectural style: Neoclassical style

Listed Building – Grade II*
- Official name: The Guildhall
- Designated: 29 July 1950
- Reference no.: 1343844

Faversham Guildhall is a municipal building in the Market Place in Faversham, Kent, England. The structure, which was the meeting place of Faversham Borough Council, is a Grade II* listed building.

== History ==
The first guildhall in Faversham was a medieval structure on the east side of Tanners Street; this was replaced by a second guildhall on the east side of Court Street in 1547. Queen Elizabeth I visited this guildhall and enjoyed a civic banquet there in 1572.

The town received a royal charter, allowing it to hold markets, from King Henry VIII in 1546. The market initially took the form of a series of stalls in the area now known as the Market Place but in the mid-16th century it was decided to build a permanent structure. The new market hall was a timber-framed structure with a stucco finish which was completed in 1574. It was arcaded on the ground floor, so that markets could be held, with an assembly room on the first floor. The original design involved a symmetrical main frontage with five bays facing onto the east side of the Market Place: there was a row of sash windows on the first floor.

In 1605 the borough council took over the building for use as its third guildhall. Following a disastrous fire, caused by the excesses of local people celebrating British military successes in the Napoleonic Wars, the building had to be rebuilt in 1814. The enlarged structure, which preserved the original arcading, was designed by Charles Drayson in the neoclassical style and featured a three-stage tower at the southwest corner; the tower involved an arched doorway on the ground floor, a round-headed sash window on the first floor, a clock on the second floor and an octagonal cupola with a weather vane above. (The clock, dated 1814, was by Francis Crow, clockmaker of Faversham.) As part of the re-building, the building was extended by an extra two bays on the east and west facing elevations; the north facing elevation featured a Venetian window with a pediment above containing a cartouche depicting the borough coat of arms in the tympanum, while the south facing elevation featured two round headed windows with a similar pediment also containing a cartouche. Internally, the principal room was the council chamber, on the first floor, which contained wooden panels listing the mayors of the town since the late 13th century as well as a series of miniature photographs of mayors since the early 19th century. County court hearings and borough council meetings were held in the guildhall until 1942, when the local court hearings were discontinued and the borough council relocated to the Alexander Centre.

The Alexander Centre ceased to be the local seat of government when the enlarged Swale Borough Council in 1974, but the guildhall subsequently became the meeting place of Faversham Town Council. A paving stone to celebrate the life of the locally-born soldier, Lieutenant General Sir Philip Neame of the Royal Engineers, who, as a junior officer, was awarded the Victoria Cross for his actions at Neuve-Chapelle in France during the First World War, was unveiled outside the guildhall by Lieutenant-General Sir Mark Mans on 19 December 2014. The guildhall became an approved venue for weddings and civil partnerships in January 2019.

Works of art in the guildhall included a portrait by Joseph Clover of a local benefactor, Henry Wreight, who paid for the rebuilding of the Faversham Almshouses in the early 19th century.

== See also ==
- Grade II* listed buildings in Swale
