= Listed buildings in Faversham =

Civil Parish in Kent, England

Faversham is a town and civil parish in the Swale District of Kent, England. It contains three grade I, 23 II*, 319 grade II listed buildings that are recorded in the National Heritage List for England.

This list is based on the information retrieved online from Historic England

== Key ==
Grade	Criteria
I	Buildings that are of exceptional interest
II*	Particularly important buildings of more than special interest
II	Buildings that are of special interest

== Listing ==
Name	Grade	Location	Type	Completed (Note: The date given is the date used by Historic England as significant for the initial building or that of an important part in the structure's description.)	Date designated	Grid ref. (Note: The grid reference is based on the British national grid reference system, sometimes known as OSGB36, used by the Ordnance Survey.) Geo-coordinates	Notes	Entry number (Note: The "List Entry Number" is a unique number assigned to each listed building and scheduled monument by Historic England.)	Image	Wikidata
Abbey Farmhouse	II*	Abbey Fields			3 August 1972	TR0209561831; 51°19′11″N 0°53′56″E		1060995	Upload Photo	Q17546188
Cartshed and Adjoining Shed about 80 Metres South East of Abbey Farmhouse	II	Abbey Fields			17 January 1989	TR0216161770; 51°19′09″N 0°53′59″E		1261088	Upload Photo	Q26552064
Faversham Abbey Major Barn	II*	Abbey Fields			3 August 1972	TR0211161762; 51°19′09″N 0°53′57″E		1344267	Upload Photo	Q17546583
Faversham Abbey Minor Barn	I	Abbey Fields			3 August 1972	TR0212761732; 51°19′08″N 0°53′57″E		1060996	Upload Photo	Q122853366
Medieval Stables at Abbey Farm	II*	Abbey Fields			17 January 1989	TR0216461803; 51°19′10″N 0°53′59″E		1268252	Upload Photo	Q17546440
Stables about 30 Metres East South East of Abbey Farmhouse	II	Abbey Fields			17 January 1989	TR0214261812; 51°19′10″N 0°53′58″E		1240320	Upload Photo	Q26533251
The Masonic Hall	II*	Abbey Place			29 July 1950	TR0185161636; 51°19′05″N 0°53′43″E		1344229	Upload Photo	Q17546568
Fighting Cocks Cottages	II	2 and 3, Abbey Place			3 August 1972	TR0190261704; 51°19′07″N 0°53′46″E		1060997	Upload Photo	Q26314133
1 and 2, Abbey Road	II	1 and 2, Abbey Road			3 August 1972	TR0196561900; 51°19′13″N 0°53′49″E		1060999	Upload Photo	Q26314135
3, Abbey Road	II	3, Abbey Road			27 September 1989	TR0199261856; 51°19′12″N 0°53′51″E		1261089	Upload Photo	Q26552065
Granite Setts and Gutter Extending Along the Outer Part of the Pavement from No 3 Abbey Street As Far North As No 34	II	Abbey Street			3 August 1972	TR0172461640; 51°19′05″N 0°53′36″E		1061008	Upload Photo	Q26314146
Gutter Setts and Gutter Extending Along the Outer Part of the Pavement from No 81 As Far South As No 99 (phoenix Public House)	II	Abbey Street			3 August 1972	TR0176061661; 51°19′06″N 0°53′38″E		1319908	Upload Photo	Q26605966
Wall Enclosing Garden Behind Arden's House on the North Side	II	Abbey Street			3 August 1972	TR0183661733; 51°19′08″N 0°53′42″E		1061011	Upload Photo	Q26314150
Warehouse in Abbey Green to East of Nos 59 to 62 (consecutive)	II	Abbey Street			3 August 1972	TR0194061816; 51°19′11″N 0°53′48″E		1061010	Upload Photo	Q26314149
3 and 4, Abbey Street	II	3 and 4, Abbey Street			29 July 1950	TR0168161602; 51°19′04″N 0°53′34″E		1061000	Upload Photo	Q26314136
5, Abbey Street	II	5, Abbey Street			29 July 1950	TR0168961612; 51°19′04″N 0°53′35″E		1061001	Upload Photo	Q26314137
6, Abbey Street	II	6, Abbey Street			4 May 1970	TR0169661620; 51°19′05″N 0°53′35″E		1061002	Upload Photo	Q26314139
7, Abbey Street	II	7, Abbey Street			4 May 1970	TR0169861622; 51°19′05″N 0°53′35″E		1061003	Upload Photo	Q26314140
Lamp Posts on Pavement Outside Nos 3	II	7, 14, 20, 28 and 34, Abbey Street			3 August 1972	TR0172961646; 51°19′05″N 0°53′37″E		1061009	Upload Photo	Q26314147
8 and 9, Abbey Street	II	8 and 9, Abbey Street			29 July 1950	TR0170261627; 51°19′05″N 0°53′35″E		1061004	Upload Photo	Q26314141
10-12, Abbey Street	II	10-12, Abbey Street			4 May 1970	TR0171061637; 51°19′05″N 0°53′36″E		1186121	Upload Photo	Q26481394
14, Abbey Street	II	14, Abbey Street, ME13 7BE			4 May 1970	TR0172361651; 51°19′05″N 0°53′36″E		1344230	Upload Photo	Q26627969
15, 16, 17 and 18, Abbey Street	II	15, 16, 17 and 18, Abbey Street			4 May 1970	TR0173361661; 51°19′06″N 0°53′37″E		1186130	Upload Photo	Q26481403
19, Abbey Street	II	19, Abbey Street			29 July 1950	TR0174461671; 51°19′06″N 0°53′37″E		1061005	Upload Photo	Q26314142
20, Abbey Street	II	20, Abbey Street			4 May 1970	TR0175061678; 51°19′06″N 0°53′38″E		1061006	Upload Photo	Q26314143
21 and 22, Abbey Street	II	21 and 22, Abbey Street			4 May 1970	TR0175461683; 51°19′06″N 0°53′38″E		1186140	Upload Photo	Q26481413
23 and 24, Abbey Street	II	23 and 24, Abbey Street			4 May 1970	TR0176061688; 51°19′07″N 0°53′38″E		1344231	Upload Photo	Q26627970
25-28, Abbey Street	II	25-28, Abbey Street			4 May 1970	TR0177161700; 51°19′07″N 0°53′39″E		1061007	Upload Photo	Q26314145
29 and 30, Abbey Street	II	29 and 30, Abbey Street			29 July 1950	TR0178161711; 51°19′07″N 0°53′39″E		1186148	Upload Photo	Q26481420
31 and 32, Abbey Street	II	31 and 32, Abbey Street			3 September 1969	TR0178761717; 51°19′08″N 0°53′40″E		1344232	Upload Photo	Q26627971
34, Abbey Street	II	34, Abbey Street			29 July 1950	TR0179661728; 51°19′08″N 0°53′40″E		1299330	Upload Photo	Q26586742
50 and 51, Abbey Street	II	50 and 51, Abbey Street			3 August 1972	TR0192161871; 51°19′12″N 0°53′47″E		1186178	Upload Photo	Q26481446
Anchor Cottage	II	52, Abbey Street			3 August 1972	TR0193761902; 51°19′13″N 0°53′48″E		1344233	Upload Photo	Q26627972
59-62, Abbey Street	II	59-62, Abbey Street			3 August 1972	TR0191761828; 51°19′11″N 0°53′47″E		1186190	Upload Photo	Q26481458
63 and 64, Abbey Street	II	63 and 64, Abbey Street			3 August 1972	TR0189461801; 51°19′10″N 0°53′45″E		1344234	Upload Photo	Q26627973
Arden's House	II*	80, Abbey Street			29 July 1950	TR0182861729; 51°19′08″N 0°53′42″E		1186199	Upload Photo	Q17546372
81, Abbey Street	II*	81, Abbey Street			29 July 1950	TR0181761715; 51°19′07″N 0°53′41″E		1344235	Upload Photo	Q17546573
Lamp Posts on Pavement Outside Nos 80	II	81, 83, 91, 95 And South Of No 99, Abbey Street			3 August 1972	TR0175661655; 51°19′06″N 0°53′38″E		1061014	Upload Photo	Q26314152
82 and 83, Abbey Street	II	82 and 83, Abbey Street			29 July 1950	TR0179861691; 51°19′07″N 0°53′40″E		1186212	Upload Photo	Q26481478
84, Abbey Street	II*	84, Abbey Street			29 July 1950	TR0179261682; 51°19′06″N 0°53′40″E		1240604	Upload Photo	Q17546382
85 and 86, Abbey Street	II	85 and 86, Abbey Street			3 August 1972	TR0178761676; 51°19′06″N 0°53′40″E		1061012	Upload Photo	Q26314151
87 to 92, Abbey Street	II*	87 To 92, Abbey Street			29 July 1950	TR0177361664; 51°19′06″N 0°53′39″E		1061013	Upload Photo	Q17546193
94 and 95, Abbey Street	II	94 and 95, Abbey Street, ME13 7BH			29 January 1962	TR0174861639; 51°19′05″N 0°53′38″E		1116531	Upload Photo	Q26410132
Phoenix Tavern	II	98 and 99, Abbey Street, ME13 7BH			4 May 1970	TR0173261621; 51°19′05″N 0°53′37″E		1344236	Upload Photo	Q26627974
Copton Manor Farm Store and Oast	II	Ashford Road, North Street			3 August 1972	TR0148159452; 51°17′55″N 0°53′19″E		1061015	Upload Photo	Q26314153
Copton Windmill	II	Ashford Road, North Street			3 August 1972	TR0129459544; 51°17′58″N 0°53′10″E		1116513	Upload Photo	Q5169087
Orchard Cottages	II	1 and 2, Ashford Road, North Street			3 August 1972	TR0153360464; 51°18′27″N 0°53′24″E		1344237	Upload Photo	Q26627975
148, Ashford Road	II	148, Ashford Road, North Street			3 August 1972	TR0147459436; 51°17′54″N 0°53′19″E		1319915	Upload Photo	Q26605973
Faversham Chandlery	II	Belvedere Road			27 January 1988	TR0161661663; 51°19′06″N 0°53′31″E		1261087	Upload Photo	Q26552063
Provender Mill	II	Belvedere Road			3 August 1972	TR0164961713; 51°19′08″N 0°53′33″E		1069471	Upload Photo	Q26322499
1, Belvedere Road	II	1, Belvedere Road			3 August 1972	TR0163061626; 51°19′05″N 0°53′32″E		1061016	Upload Photo	Q26314154
Barn to North of Nos 1 and 2 (brent Hill Bungalow)	II	Brent Hill, Davington			3 August 1972	TR0119961757; 51°19′10″N 0°53′10″E		1069475	Upload Photo	Q26322507
Davington Manor	II	Brent Hill, Davington			3 August 1972	TR0126261765; 51°19′10″N 0°53′13″E		1069477	Upload Photo	Q26322511
Hillside	II	Brent Hill, Davington			29 July 1950	TR0123961750; 51°19′09″N 0°53′12″E		1343849	Upload Photo	Q26627616
Outhouse to the West of Nos 1 and 2 (brent Hill Bungalow)	II	Brent Hill, Davington			3 August 1972	TR0118061720; 51°19′08″N 0°53′08″E		1343848	Upload Photo	Q26627615
Ravenscourt	II	Brent Hill, Davington			3 August 1972	TR0115761740; 51°19′09″N 0°53′07″E		1069472	Upload Photo	Q26322501
Ravenscourt Cottage	II	Brent Hill, Davington			3 August 1972	TR0116561725; 51°19′09″N 0°53′08″E		1069473	Upload Photo	Q26322503
Wall and Gate Piers Enclosing Gardens to the Lawn and Hillside on the South West Side	II	Brent Hill, Davington			3 August 1972	TR0122461705; 51°19′08″N 0°53′11″E		1069476	Upload Photo	Q26322509
Wall to Nos 1 and 2 (brent Hill Cottages) on North West and South East Sides	II	Brent Hill, Davington			3 August 1972	TR0124861685; 51°19′07″N 0°53′12″E		1116435	Upload Photo	Q26410049
Wall to Sycamore Lodge	II	Brent Hill, Davington			3 August 1972	TR0128661672; 51°19′07″N 0°53′14″E		1343851	Upload Photo	Q26627618
1, Brent Hill	II	1, Brent Hill, Davington			3 August 1972	TR0119761718; 51°19′08″N 0°53′09″E		1069474	Upload Photo	Q26322505
Brent Hill Cottages	II	1 and 2, Brent Hill, Davington			3 August 1972	TR0123961684; 51°19′07″N 0°53′11″E		1069478	Upload Photo	Q26322513
Malthouse and Oasthouse at Perry Court Farm	II	Brogdale Road			3 August 1972	TR0097060382; 51°18′25″N 0°52′55″E		1343852	Upload Photo	Q26627619
Former Cherry Tree Public House	II	Canterbury Road, Preston Lea			27 September 1989	TR0175860505; 51°18′28″N 0°53′36″E		1240323	Upload Photo	Q26533254
MacKnade	II	Canterbury Road			29 July 1950	TR0227660300; 51°18′21″N 0°54′02″E		1069479	Upload Photo	Q26322515
Oasts at MacKnade Farm to West of MacKnade Farm Cottages	II	Canterbury Road			3 August 1972	TR0231360235; 51°18′19″N 0°54′04″E		1069480	Upload Photo	Q26322517
Outhouse Attached to Right of No 3 Cherry Tree Cottages	II	Canterbury Road, Preston Lea			27 September 1989	TR0177460498; 51°18′28″N 0°53′37″E		1240460	Upload Photo	Q26533383
Thatched Cottages	II	Canterbury Road, Preston Lea			27 September 1989	TR0180760511; 51°18′29″N 0°53′38″E		1240462	Upload Photo	Q26533385
The Windmill Public House	II	Canterbury Road, Preston Lea			27 September 1989	TR0178660497; 51°18′28″N 0°53′37″E		1240461	Upload Photo	Q26533384
Cherry Tree Cottages	II	1-3, Canterbury Road, Preston Lea			27 September 1989	TR0176760502; 51°18′28″N 0°53′36″E		1261090	Upload Photo	Q26552066
Corporation Boundary Stone	II	Chart Mills			27 September 1989	TR0097061234; 51°18′53″N 0°52′57″E		1240463	Upload Photo	Q26533386
Flint House	II	Church Road			2 September 1998	TR0183861418; 51°18′58″N 0°53′42″E		1376267	Upload Photo	Q26656881
St Mary Court	II	Church Road, ME13 8AZ			3 August 1972	TR0178361399; 51°18′57″N 0°53′39″E		1343853	Upload Photo	Q26627620
The Parish Church of St Mary of Charity	I	Church Road			29 July 1950	TR0182261535; 51°19′02″N 0°53′41″E		1319973	The Parish Church of St Mary of Charity More images	Q5438574
The Training Ship Hasarde	II*	Conduit Street			29 July 1950	TR0158461615; 51°19′05″N 0°53′29″E		1116391	Upload Photo	Q17546361
5, Conduit Street	II	5, Conduit Street			3 August 1972	TR0158061580; 51°19′03″N 0°53′29″E		1069481	Upload Photo	Q26322519
Bollard Within the Curtilage of No 25 on the Corner of Court Street and Quay Lane	II	Court Street			3 August 1972	TR0167161581; 51°19′03″N 0°53′34″E		1116328	Upload Photo	Q26409954
Bollard Within the Curtilage of Nos 8 and 9 on the Corner of Partridge Lane and Court Street	II	Court Street			3 August 1972	TR0160661471; 51°19′00″N 0°53′30″E		1069484	Upload Photo	Q26322525
Fremlins Offices (including East Wing and Billiard Room)	II*	Court Street			29 July 1950	TR0166361512; 51°19′01″N 0°53′33″E		1069489	Upload Photo	Q17546322
Laboratory (formerly Offices) to Fremlins Brewery	II	Court Street			9 July 1990	TR0167761543; 51°19′02″N 0°53′34″E		1260982	Upload Photo	Q26551963
Omnibus Enquiry Office	II	Court Street			3 August 1972	TR0161661446; 51°18′59″N 0°53′30″E		1116314	Upload Photo	Q26409941
Wall and Gate Pier between Laboratory and Brewery House	II	Court Street			9 July 1990	TR0168261562; 51°19′03″N 0°53′34″E		1240514	Upload Photo	Q26533437
Wall and Gate Piers to Fremlins Brewery between Office and Laboratory	II	Court Street			9 July 1990	TR0166561533; 51°19′02″N 0°53′33″E		1240513	Upload Photo	Q26533436
Wall Enclosing Garden Behind No 25 on North Side	II	Court Street			3 August 1972	TR0164861592; 51°19′04″N 0°53′32″E		1069488	Upload Photo	Q26322533
1 and 1a, Court Street	II	1 and 1a, Court Street			4 May 1970	TR0157861419; 51°18′58″N 0°53′28″E		1343854	Upload Photo	Q26627621
2 and 3, Court Street	II	2 and 3, Court Street			3 August 1972	TR0158161429; 51°18′58″N 0°53′29″E		1319966	Upload Photo	Q26606016
4, Court Street	II	4, Court Street			29 July 1950	TR0158661439; 51°18′59″N 0°53′29″E		1069482	Upload Photo	Q26322521
5 and 5a, Court Street	II	5 and 5a, Court Street			3 August 1972	TR0158961447; 51°18′59″N 0°53′29″E		1069483	Upload Photo	Q26322523
6, Court Street	II	6, Court Street			3 August 1972	TR0159261455; 51°18′59″N 0°53′29″E		1116379	Upload Photo	Q26410002
7, Court Street	II	7, Court Street			3 August 1972	TR0159561461; 51°19′00″N 0°53′29″E		1343815	Upload Photo	Q26627586
8 and 9, Court Street	II	8 and 9, Court Street			4 May 1970	TR0159961467; 51°19′00″N 0°53′30″E		1116381	Upload Photo	Q26410004
10, 11 and 11a, Court Street	II	10, 11 and 11a, Court Street			11 November 1970	TR0160661482; 51°19′00″N 0°53′30″E		1343816	Upload Photo	Q26627587
17, Court Street	II	17, Court Street			3 August 1972	TR0162361512; 51°19′01″N 0°53′31″E		1116342	Upload Photo	Q26409967
18, Court Street	II	18, Court Street			4 May 1970	TR0163361527; 51°19′02″N 0°53′31″E		1069485	Upload Photo	Q26322527
19, Court Street	II	19, Court Street			29 July 1950	TR0163761540; 51°19′02″N 0°53′32″E		1116354	Upload Photo	Q26409978
20-22, Court Street	II	20-22, Court Street			29 July 1950	TR0164661551; 51°19′02″N 0°53′32″E		1069486	Upload Photo	Q26322529
23, Court Street	II	23, Court Street			29 July 1950	TR0165361562; 51°19′03″N 0°53′33″E		1343817	Upload Photo	Q26627588
24, Court Street	II	24, Court Street			29 July 1950	TR0166061571; 51°19′03″N 0°53′33″E		1116320	Upload Photo	Q26409947
25, Court Street	II	25, Court Street			29 July 1950	TR0166461580; 51°19′03″N 0°53′33″E		1069487	Upload Photo	Q26322531
39 and 39a, Court Street	II	39 and 39a, Court Street			29 July 1950	TR0163561466; 51°19′00″N 0°53′31″E		1116306	Upload Photo	Q26409933
Stone Setts in Pavement Within Curtilage of Nos 39	II	39a and 40 To West Side, Court Street			3 August 1972	TR0162761465; 51°19′00″N 0°53′31″E		1069491	Upload Photo	Q26322537
40, Court Street	II	40, Court Street			29 July 1950	TR0162861449; 51°18′59″N 0°53′31″E		1069490	Upload Photo	Q26322535
41, Court Street	II	41, Court Street			3 August 1972	TR0161461440; 51°18′59″N 0°53′30″E		1069492	Upload Photo	Q26322539
42 and 43, Court Street	II	42 and 43, Court Street			3 August 1972	TR0161061431; 51°18′59″N 0°53′30″E		1069448	Upload Photo	Q26322459
44 and 45, Court Street	II	44 and 45, Court Street			3 August 1972	TR0160361415; 51°18′58″N 0°53′30″E		1069449	Upload Photo	Q26322461
46, Court Street	II	46, Court Street			3 August 1972	TR0159861404; 51°18′58″N 0°53′29″E		1069450	Upload Photo	Q26322463
47, Court Street	II	47, Court Street			29 July 1950	TR0159661396; 51°18′57″N 0°53′29″E		1069451	Upload Photo	Q26322465
48, Court Street	II	48, Court Street			3 August 1972	TR0159261390; 51°18′57″N 0°53′29″E		1343837	Upload Photo	Q26627606
Rose Cottage	II	Davington Hill			3 August 1972	TR0114561782; 51°19′10″N 0°53′07″E		1343838	Upload Photo	Q26627607
Stonebridge Cottages	II	1, Davington Hill			4 May 1970	TR0104561580; 51°19′04″N 0°53′01″E		1069452	Upload Photo	Q26322467
3-8, Davington Hill	II	3-8, Davington Hill			3 August 1972	TR0105561603; 51°19′05″N 0°53′02″E		1069453	Upload Photo	Q26322469
Walls Enclosing Garden to Davington Manor on West	II	East And South East Sides, Brent Hill, Davington			3 August 1972	TR0129761747; 51°19′09″N 0°53′15″E		1343850	Upload Photo	Q26627617
Church of St Saviour	II	East Street			28 January 1983	TR0200861234; 51°18′52″N 0°53′50″E		1240313	Upload Photo	Q26533245
Cooksditch	II*	East Street			29 July 1950	TR0177261320; 51°18′55″N 0°53′38″E		1069457	Upload Photo	Q17546312
2, 3 and 3a, East Street	II	2, 3 and 3a, East Street			4 May 1970	TR0164161323; 51°18′55″N 0°53′31″E		1069454	Upload Photo	Q26322471
4, East Street	II	4, East Street			3 August 1972	TR0165061322; 51°18′55″N 0°53′32″E		1343839	Upload Photo	Q26627608
5, East Street	II	5, East Street			29 July 1950	TR0166261324; 51°18′55″N 0°53′33″E		1069455	Upload Photo	Q26322473
16, East Street	II	16, East Street			3 August 1972	TR0172961315; 51°18′55″N 0°53′36″E		1069456	Upload Photo	Q26322475
17-19, East Street	II	17-19, East Street			3 August 1972	TR0174361314; 51°18′55″N 0°53′37″E		1343840	Upload Photo	Q26627609
55 and 55a, East Street	II	55 and 55a, East Street			4 May 1970	TR0165061304; 51°18′54″N 0°53′32″E		1116248	Upload Photo	Q26409886
Former Forge Now Part of Curtilage of 64 West Street	II	Flood Lane			27 September 1989	TR0116461519; 51°19′02″N 0°53′07″E		1240483	Upload Photo	Q26533406
Air Compressor Room and Stabling	II	Fremlin Brewery, Court Street			9 July 1990	TR0175961544; 51°19′02″N 0°53′38″E		1260949	Upload Photo	Q26551932
Brewery House	II	Fremlins Brewery, Court Street			9 July 1990	TR0169661572; 51°19′03″N 0°53′35″E		1260947	Upload Photo	Q26551930
Carpenters Shop	II	Fremlins Brewery, Court Street			9 July 1990	TR0172361567; 51°19′03″N 0°53′36″E		1240601	Upload Photo	Q26533518
Malthouse	II	Fremlins Brewery, Court Street			9 July 1990	TR0175461504; 51°19′01″N 0°53′38″E		1240602	Upload Photo	Q26533519
Old Tun Room	II	Fremlins Brewery, Court Street			9 July 1990	TR0170061509; 51°19′01″N 0°53′35″E		1240603	Upload Photo	Q26533520
1-6, Gatefield Lane	II	1-6, Gatefield Lane			3 August 1972	TR0162761203; 51°18′51″N 0°53′30″E		1343841	Upload Photo	Q26627610
The Shipwrights Arms Public House	II	Hollowshore			27 September 1989	TR0175463612; 51°20′09″N 0°53′42″E		1240465	Upload Photo	Q26533388
1, Hugh Place	II	1, Hugh Place			3 August 1972	TR0154161341; 51°18′56″N 0°53′26″E		1116251	Upload Photo	Q26409889
Walls to North East and South West of the Masonic Hall	II	Including Gateway To The North East, Abbey Place			3 August 1972	TR0183061606; 51°19′04″N 0°53′42″E		1060998	Upload Photo	Q26314134
Chapel House	II	London Road, Ospringe			29 July 1950	TR0087160695; 51°18′36″N 0°52′50″E		1069460	Upload Photo	Q26322481
The Mount	II	London Road, Ospringe			3 August 1972	TR0056660831; 51°18′40″N 0°52′35″E		1343843	Upload Photo	Q26627612
Kosicot	II	Lower Road			27 September 1989	TR0086661194; 51°18′52″N 0°52′51″E		1260996	Upload Photo	Q26551977
1 and 2, Market Street	II	1 and 2, Market Street			3 August 1972	TR0159561350; 51°18′56″N 0°53′29″E		1069467	Upload Photo	Q26322493
9, Market Street	II	9, Market Street			3 August 1972	TR0160361322; 51°18′55″N 0°53′29″E		1069468	Upload Photo	Q26322495
2, Middle Row	II	2, Middle Row			3 August 1972	TR0162761424; 51°18′58″N 0°53′31″E		1069469	Upload Photo	Q26322497
Stable Building (?) between Nos 22 and 23	II	Nightingale Road			27 September 1989	TR0104461135; 51°18′50″N 0°53′00″E		1240509	Upload Photo	Q26533432
Grove House and Garage to South	II	Oare Road, Davington			29 July 1950	TR0061462649; 51°19′39″N 0°52′41″E		1389587	Upload Photo	Q26669022
Oare Windmill	II	Oare Road, Davington			29 July 1950	TR0092862540; 51°19′35″N 0°52′57″E		1069470	Upload Photo	Q7074368
Former William Gibbs School	II	Orchard Place			24 February 1987	TR0187261366; 51°18′56″N 0°53′43″E		1240317	Upload Photo	Q26533248
Water Lane	II	Ospringe, ME13 8UA			29 November 1971	TR0014660498; 51°18′30″N 0°52′13″E		1074906	Upload Photo	Q26337489
5-9, Ospringe Street	II	5-9, Ospringe Street, Ospringe			3 August 1972	TR0044060837; 51°18′41″N 0°52′29″E		1069428	Upload Photo	Q26322422
The Ship Inn	II	12, Ospringe Street, Ospringe			3 August 1972	TR0040160863; 51°18′42″N 0°52′27″E		1343870	Upload Photo	Q26627638
15, Ospringe Street	II*	15, Ospringe Street, Ospringe			29 July 1950	TR0038060850; 51°18′41″N 0°52′25″E		1069430	Upload Photo	Q17546307
35-39, Ospringe Street	II	35-39, Ospringe Street, Ospringe			29 July 1950	TR0030360861; 51°18′42″N 0°52′22″E		1069432	Upload Photo	Q26322426
50-60, Ospringe Street	II	50-60, Ospringe Street, Ospringe			3 August 1972	TR0021260911; 51°18′43″N 0°52′17″E		1320245	Upload Photo	Q26606268
65, Ospringe Street	II	65, Ospringe Street, Ospringe			3 August 1972	TR0021860885; 51°18′43″N 0°52′17″E		1069434	Upload Photo	Q26322430
Grove Cottage	II	Preston Grove			22 December 1983	TR0151360748; 51°18′37″N 0°53′24″E		1261084	Upload Photo	Q26682095
38 and 42, Preston Grove	II	38 and 42, Preston Grove, Preston			3 August 1972	TR0149160631; 51°18′33″N 0°53′22″E		1343872	Upload Photo	Q26627640
Church of St Catherine	II*	Preston Lane, Preston			29 July 1950	TR0168260768; 51°18′37″N 0°53′32″E		1115766	Upload Photo	Q7592756
House Immediately to West North West of Drill Hall	II	Preston Street			16 January 1989	TR0150861120; 51°18′49″N 0°53′24″E		1240322	Upload Photo	Q26533253
Wall and Gate Piers Enclosing Garden to West of Delbridge House on Its North Side	II	Preston Street			3 August 1972	TR0145860970; 51°18′44″N 0°53′21″E		1343836	Upload Photo	Q26627605
Wall Enclosing Garden Behind Wreights House on South Side	II	Preston Street			3 August 1972	TR0142760897; 51°18′41″N 0°53′20″E		1115673	Upload Photo	Q26409371
7 and 8, Preston Street	II	7 and 8, Preston Street			4 May 1970	TR0161961260; 51°18′53″N 0°53′30″E		1343873	Upload Photo	Q26627641
12, Preston Street	II	12, Preston Street			3 August 1972	TR0160561228; 51°18′52″N 0°53′29″E		1069439	Upload Photo	Q26322441
14, Preston Street	II	14, Preston Street			29 July 1950	TR0160061212; 51°18′51″N 0°53′29″E		1320277	Upload Photo	Q26606295
18 and 19, Preston Street	II	18 and 19, Preston Street			3 August 1972	TR0158861174; 51°18′50″N 0°53′28″E		1069441	Upload Photo	Q26322445
37, Preston Street	II	37, Preston Street			3 August 1972	TR0154361044; 51°18′46″N 0°53′26″E		1240306	Upload Photo	Q26533238
Mall House	II	49, Preston Street			29 July 1950	TR0144360882; 51°18′41″N 0°53′20″E		1240308	Upload Photo	Q26533240
Chase House	II	55 and 55a, Preston Street			29 July 1950	TR0149160984; 51°18′44″N 0°53′23″E		1115652	Upload Photo	Q26409351
57 and 58, Preston Street	II	57 and 58, Preston Street			4 May 1970	TR0150761015; 51°18′45″N 0°53′24″E		1069444	Upload Photo	Q26322451
77, Preston Street	II	77, Preston Street			3 August 1972	TR0158261220; 51°18′52″N 0°53′28″E		1069447	Upload Photo	Q26322457
88, Preston Street	II	88, Preston Street			3 August 1972	TR0161161299; 51°18′54″N 0°53′30″E		1115616	Upload Photo	Q26409318
Wall in Garden to Davington Priory to West of House	II	Priory Road, Davington			3 August 1972	TR0106761730; 51°19′09″N 0°53′03″E		1320323	Upload Photo	Q26606335
Coach House and Wall about 10 Metres East of St Anne's Cross Public House	II	South Road			27 September 1989	TR0104361178; 51°18′51″N 0°53′00″E		1240511	Upload Photo	Q26533434
St Anns Cross Public House	II	South Road			27 September 1989	TR0105761179; 51°18′51″N 0°53′01″E		1240590	Upload Photo	Q26533508
69 and 71, South Road	II	69 and 71, South Road			3 August 1972	TR0116461212; 51°18′52″N 0°53′07″E		1320340	Upload Photo	Q26606350
Warehouse about 15 Metres North East of Provender Mill (gilletts Limited)	II	Standard Quay			27 September 1989	TR0195761957; 51°19′15″N 0°53′49″E		1240512	Upload Photo	Q26533435
Warehouse about 30 Metres North East of Provender Mill (gilletts Limited)	II	Standard Quay			27 September 1989	TR0197961969; 51°19′15″N 0°53′50″E		1240591	Upload Photo	Q26533509
Faversham Railway Station	II	Station Road			18 December 1986	TR0162360902; 51°18′41″N 0°53′30″E		1240315	Upload Photo	Q4753369
The Three Tuns Inn	II	Tanners Street			3 August 1972	TR0115661352; 51°18′57″N 0°53′07″E		1069410	Upload Photo	Q26322387
21 and 22, Tanners Street	II	21 and 22, Tanners Street			3 August 1972	TR0113661326; 51°18′56″N 0°53′05″E		1069411	Upload Photo	Q26322389
50-52, Tanners Street	II	50-52, Tanners Street			3 August 1972	TR0113861393; 51°18′58″N 0°53′06″E		1069414	Upload Photo	Q26322395
Ham Farmhouse and Walls Attached	II	The Ham			27 September 1989	TR0188362742; 51°19′41″N 0°53′47″E		1240464	Upload Photo	Q26533387
Railings in Front of No 49	II	The Mall, Preston			3 August 1972	TR0137660658; 51°18′34″N 0°53′16″E		1069461	Upload Photo	Q26322483
43-45, The Mall	II	43-45, The Mall			27 September 1989	TR0139960705; 51°18′35″N 0°53′18″E		1240507	Upload Photo	Q26533430
Pump	II	The Market Place			3 August 1972	TR0157661396; 51°18′57″N 0°53′28″E		1116164	Upload Photo	Q26409815
1, The Market Place	II*	1, The Market Place			29 July 1950	TR0154861377; 51°18′57″N 0°53′27″E		1069462	Upload Photo	Q17546317
The Bear Inn Public House	II	3, The Market Place			5 April 1982	TR0155461386; 51°18′57″N 0°53′27″E		1261083	Upload Photo	Q26552059
5 and 6, The Market Place	II*	5 and 6, The Market Place			29 July 1950	TR0156261398; 51°18′58″N 0°53′28″E		1343845	Upload Photo	Q17546492
15, The Market Place	II	15, The Market Place			3 August 1972	TR0154861357; 51°18′56″N 0°53′27″E		1069466	Upload Photo	Q26322491
Church of St John the Evangelist	II	Upper Brents			3 August 1972	TR0151561785; 51°19′10″N 0°53′26″E		1074900	Upload Photo	Q26337476
Fern Lodge	II	Water Lane, Ospringe			3 August 1972	TR0027560743; 51°18′38″N 0°52′20″E		1074904	Upload Photo	Q26337485
Orchard House	II	Water Lane, Ospringe			29 July 1950	TR0029760748; 51°18′38″N 0°52′21″E		1360991	Upload Photo	Q26643028
Bridge Cottage	II	1 and 2, Water Lane, Ospringe			3 August 1972	TR0029260741; 51°18′38″N 0°52′21″E		1074903	Upload Photo	Q26337482
Wall Enclosing Ravenscourt on North	II	West And South Sides, Brent Hill, Davington			3 August 1972	TR0114661747; 51°19′09″N 0°53′07″E		1343847	Upload Photo	Q26627614
Twymans Mill	II	West Street, ME13 7RU			3 August 1972	TR0115061489; 51°19′01″N 0°53′06″E		1067599	Upload Photo	Q26320406
1, West Street	II	1, West Street			29 July 1950	TR0153361367; 51°18′57″N 0°53′26″E		1067590	Upload Photo	Q26320398
4 and 5, West Street	II	4 and 5, West Street, ME13 7JE			3 August 1972	TR0151261378; 51°18′57″N 0°53′25″E		1356641	Upload Photo	Q26639278
6, West Street	II	6, West Street			3 August 1972	TR0150661382; 51°18′57″N 0°53′25″E		1360993	Upload Photo	Q26643029
11, West Street	II	11, West Street			4 May 1970	TR0149061394; 51°18′57″N 0°53′24″E		1074909	Upload Photo	Q26337496
12, West Street	II	12, West Street			29 July 1950	TR0147661402; 51°18′58″N 0°53′23″E		1356644	Upload Photo	Q26639281
13, West Street	II	13, West Street			3 August 1972	TR0147061406; 51°18′58″N 0°53′23″E		1356636	Upload Photo	Q26639273
14, West Street	II	14, West Street			3 August 1972	TR0146461410; 51°18′58″N 0°53′23″E		1074910	Upload Photo	Q26337498
15-17, West Street	II	15-17, West Street			4 May 1970	TR0145361416; 51°18′58″N 0°53′22″E		1067560	Upload Photo	Q26320374
18, West Street	II	18, West Street			3 August 1972	TR0144361418; 51°18′58″N 0°53′21″E		1067561	Upload Photo	Q26320376
20, West Street	II	20, West Street			29 July 1950	TR0142961421; 51°18′58″N 0°53′21″E		1074911	Upload Photo	Q26337500
24, West Street	II	24, West Street			3 August 1972	TR0138661429; 51°18′59″N 0°53′19″E		1074912	Upload Photo	Q26337503
33, West Street	II	33, West Street			3 August 1972	TR0134161427; 51°18′59″N 0°53′16″E		1074914	Upload Photo	Q26337507
44, West Street	II	44, West Street, ME13 7JG			3 August 1972	TR0128061441; 51°18′59″N 0°53′13″E		1067564	Upload Photo	Q26320379
55-62, West Street	II	55-62, West Street			4 May 1970	TR0120961461; 51°19′00″N 0°53′09″E		1356646	Upload Photo	Q26639283
64, West Street	II	64, West Street			3 August 1972	TR0116961475; 51°19′01″N 0°53′07″E		1356647	Upload Photo	Q26639284
65, West Street	II	65, West Street			4 May 1970	TR0118561480; 51°19′01″N 0°53′08″E		1067600	Upload Photo	Q26320407
66-71, West Street	II	66-71, West Street			3 August 1972	TR0119961479; 51°19′01″N 0°53′09″E		1356648	Upload Photo	Q26639285
73 and 74, West Street	II	73 and 74, West Street			3 August 1972	TR0122561474; 51°19′00″N 0°53′10″E		1067601	Upload Photo	Q26320408
75, West Street	II	75, West Street			4 May 1970	TR0123161473; 51°19′00″N 0°53′11″E		1067602	Upload Photo	Q26320409
78, West Street	II	78, West Street			3 August 1972	TR0124861469; 51°19′00″N 0°53′11″E		1356649	Upload Photo	Q26639286
93 and 93a, West Street	II	93 and 93a, West Street			4 May 1970	TR0136461446; 51°18′59″N 0°53′17″E		1067551	Upload Photo	Q26320365
98, West Street	II	98, West Street			3 August 1972	TR0139561444; 51°18′59″N 0°53′19″E		1356650	Upload Photo	Q26639287
102 and 103, West Street	II	102 and 103, West Street			3 August 1972	TR0142861441; 51°18′59″N 0°53′21″E		1067557	Upload Photo	Q26320371
104, West Street	II	104, West Street			3 August 1972	TR0143561439; 51°18′59″N 0°53′21″E		1067604	Upload Photo	Q26320411
105 and 106, West Street	II	105 and 106, West Street			4 May 1970	TR0144261437; 51°18′59″N 0°53′21″E		1067605	Upload Photo	Q26320412
107, West Street	II	107, West Street			3 August 1972	TR0144761435; 51°18′59″N 0°53′22″E		1067529	Upload Photo	Q26320344
111, West Street	II	111, West Street			3 August 1972	TR0146361430; 51°18′59″N 0°53′22″E		1067606	Upload Photo	Q26320413
114, West Street	II	114, West Street			3 August 1972	TR0148961417; 51°18′58″N 0°53′24″E		1356689	Upload Photo	Q26639323
116, West Street	II	116, West Street			29 July 1950	TR0150661407; 51°18′58″N 0°53′25″E		1067607	Upload Photo	Q26320414
121, West Street	II*	121, West Street			29 July 1950	TR0153261386; 51°18′57″N 0°53′26″E		1067608	Upload Photo	Q17546205
122, West Street	II	122, West Street			29 July 1950	TR0153961381; 51°18′57″N 0°53′26″E		1356691	Upload Photo	Q26639325
Boundary Stone to Former Chart Gunpowder Mills	II	Westbrook Walk			27 September 1989	TR0102361286; 51°18′55″N 0°53′00″E		1240598	Upload Photo	Q26533515
Grove Cottage	II	Western Link, ME13 7UA, Davington			3 August 1972	TR0057762703; 51°19′41″N 0°52′39″E		1069425	Upload Photo	Q26322416
Former Goods Shed to Faversham Station	II	Whitstable Road			18 December 1986	TR0216360969; 51°18′43″N 0°53′58″E		1261086	Upload Photo	Q26552062
Earth House (building 5) at Former Marsh Gunpowder Works	II	Workshop Area, Ham Road			14 December 2001	TR0131862775; 51°19′42″N 0°53′18″E		1389583	Upload Photo	Q26669017
East Crystallising House (building 11) at Former Marsh Gunpowder Works	II	Workshop Area, Ham Road			14 December 2001	TR0133662739; 51°19′41″N 0°53′19″E		1389579	Upload Photo	Q26669013
Melting House (building 20) at Former Marsh Gunpowder Works	II	Workshop Area, Ham Road			14 December 2001	TR0129362773; 51°19′42″N 0°53′16″E		1389582	Upload Photo	Q26669016
West Crystallising House (building 18) at Former Marsh Gunpowder Works	II	Workshop Area, Ham Road			14 December 2001	TR0130262758; 51°19′42″N 0°53′17″E		1389580	Upload Photo	Q26669014
Faversham War Memorial	II				15 January 2014	TR0141861176; 51°18′51″N 0°53′20″E		1418393	Upload Photo	Q26676655

== See also ==
- Grade I listed buildings in Kent
- Grade II* listed buildings in Kent

== Sources ==
- Newman, John (2013) [1969], Kent: North-East and East, The Buildings of England, New Haven and London: Yale University Press, ISBN 978-0-300-18506-5
