= Mockbeggar =

Mockbeggar is a geographic name. Places with this name include:

- Mockbeggar, Swale, in Kent, England.
- Mockbeggar, Hampshire, a village in England
- Mockbeggar, a hamlet near Higham, Kent, England
- Mockbeggar Wharf in Moreton, Merseyside, England
