= Preston-next-Faversham =

Area of Faversham, Kent, England

Coordinates: 51.3091°N 0.8921°E

Preston
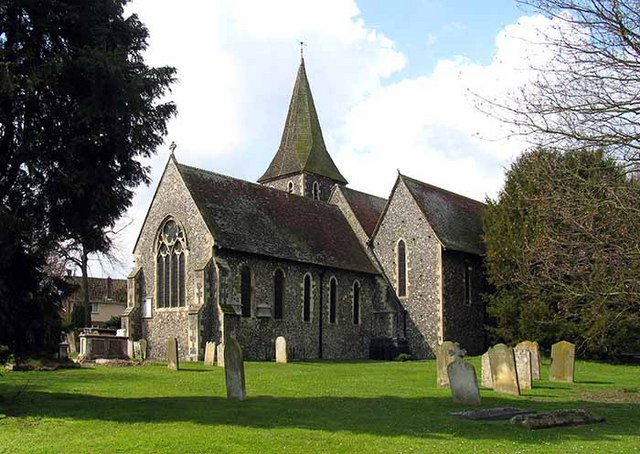
- St Catherine's Church

- Location within Kent
- Civil parish: Faversham
- District: Swale
- Shire county: Kent
- Region: South East
- Country: England
- Sovereign state: United Kingdom

Preston or Preston-next-Faversham is an area of the town of Faversham, in the Swale district, in Kent, England, which in the past was a separate village and parish. It became a civil parish in 1866, but in 1894 was divided into 2 civil parishes: Preston Within and Preston Without. Both civil parishes were absorbed into Faversham in 1935. In 1891 the parish had a population of 2374. On Ordnance Survey maps, a south-eastern area of the town is labelled Preston.

The ecclesiastical parish remains. The Grade II* listed parish church of St Catherine is of Norman origin.
