= St Catherine's Church, Preston-next-Faversham =

Church in Faversham, Kent, England

Coordinates: 51°18′37″N 0°53′32″E

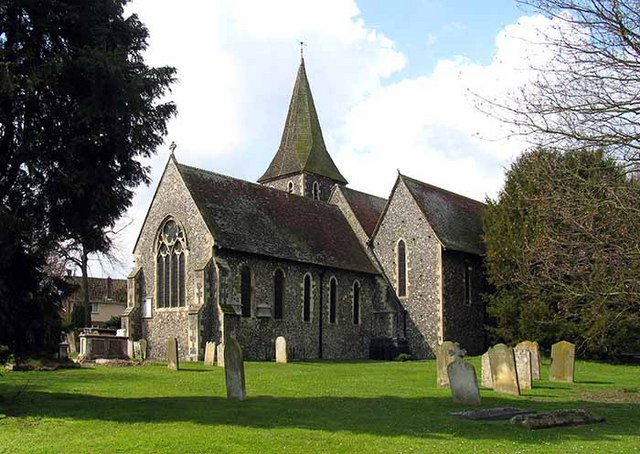
St Catherine's Church

St Catherine's Church, Preston-next-Faversham is an Anglican church in the Preston area of the town of Faversham in Kent, England.

Sir John Betjeman in the Collins Pocket Guide to English Parish Churches described St Catherine's as "high and distinguished among the railways and breweries".

The church in its current form originates from the Norman period, though there was extensive restoration work in the 1860s. It was designated as a Grade II* listed building in 1950.
