= Queen Elizabeth's Grammar School, Faversham =

Queen Elizabeth's Grammar School

Location
- Abbey Street; Faversham, Kent, ME13 7BQ; England
- 51°19′01″N 0°53′46″E

Information
- Type: Grammar School; Academy
- Motto: Quality with Excellence
- Religious affiliation: Church of England
- Established: 1576
- Department for Education URN: 136570 Tables
- Ofsted: Reports
- Chair: Ian Rawlings
- Head teacher: Amelia McIlroy
- Gender: Mixed
- Age: 11 to 18
- Enrolment: 1058
- Houses: Q, E, G, S, F, K
- Colours: Royal Blue, Red, Green, Yellow, Sky blue, Orange
- Website: http://www.queenelizabeths.kent.sch.uk/

Queen Elizabeth's Grammar School (usually known as QE or QEGS) is a selective co-educational grammar school with academy status in Faversham, Kent, southeast England. It was formed in 1967, when the Queen Elizabeth 1 Grammar School for Boys and the William Gibbs School for Girls merged and moved into new accommodation opposite.

The school is attended by approximately 1100 students, who come from Faversham and the nearby towns of Whitstable and Herne Bay. The school is a Mathematics and Computing Specialist School, a title gained in 2005. In 2009, Modern Languages was also added to that list. The headteacher is Amelia McIlroy, replacing David Anderson in September 2024, who had extensive experience in Kent Grammar Schools prior to his appointment.

== History ==
=== Foundation ===
Originally Faversham Grammar School, the School was founded in 1527 by John Cole, who endowed it with property of which he made Faversham Abbey the trustee. The property was confiscated by Henry VIII when he dissolved the abbey in 1538, and the school had to close. In 1576 the borough council successfully petitioned Queen Elizabeth I for return of the endowment, and the school re-opened. The school had no permanent home of its own till 1587 when, as a result of community effort, the purpose-built premises were erected on the western edge of the Shooting Meadows, where archery was then practised. Here the school's modern-day successor has its buildings and playing fields. The new premises of 1587 were timber-framed, and 60 tons of oak were needed for the frame, which (as usual with this type of building) was first 'test-assembled' off-site.

=== Disposition of the original building ===
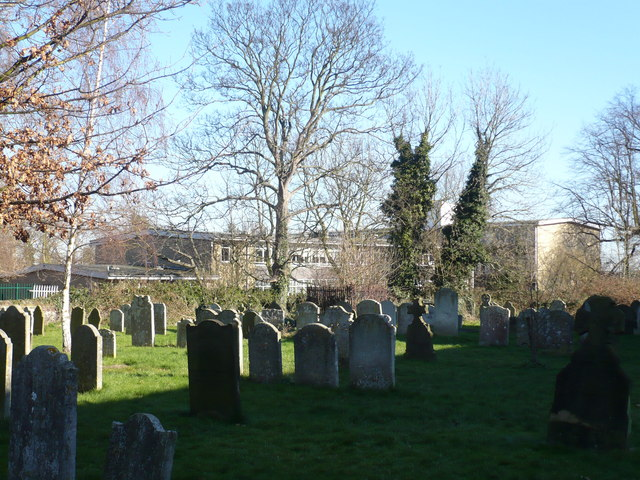
Queen Elizabeth's Grammar School from the churchyard

The Elizabethan building remained in use as a school till 1879, when much larger premises (since demolished) were erected in St Ann's Road. For a few years it was used as dwellings, and its condition began to deteriorate. Fortunately, however, the town's Masonic Lodge of Harmony was seeking a permanent home of its own, and in 1887 was able to buy it and save it from gradual decay. Conversion and restoration were undertaken by Benjamin Adkins, an architect who was also a Lodge member. The first-floor schoolroom was altered as little as possible, and extra accommodation was provided by 'under-building' where the covered playground had been at ground-floor level.

=== The Abbey ===
The Grammar School was funded in 1527 by Faversham Abbey, which was founded in 1147 by King Stephen and his Queen, Matilda. The site was just to the north east of the town, where the northern playing fields of the Queen Elizabeth Grammar School are now situated. The aim of Stephen and Matilda was to found a royal mausoleum for the House of Blois. They hoped, at that time, that the House of Blois would be victorious and rule over England for generations to come. The Abbey was dissolved in 1538 and subsequently most of it demolished as part of King Henry VIII's plans to sweep the monasteries from England. Much of the building material was removed by military engineers and transported by sea to France, where it was used to strengthen the fortifications of the towns in the Pale of Calais, which at the time was England's continental bridgehead. There is a print of Faversham Abbey in 1735, showing the Inner Gateway, demolished in 1771, the Guest House, now Arden's House and the Outer Gateway, demolished in 1772. Some of the domestic buildings remained in 1671, but not long afterwards the final traces were removed and the exact site of the once famous church sank into oblivion and was lost.

=== Graves and excavations ===
Excavations of the site have revealed that the church had a total length of about 370 feet; the long nave was flanked by north and south aisles in the usual manner and gave a total width of nearly 80 feet. The nave joined the large transept under a massive central tower, the foundation sockets of which took the form of large rectangular pits. From here the chalk foundations of the choir, still with aisles to north and south, ran eastwards to end in a large apse. This was flanked by two smaller apsidal foundations which terminate in aisles. Four more small apses existed on the transept arms. Among the few surviving buildings of Faversham Abbey are the two Barns at Abbey Farm. The smaller (Minor) Barn dates from 1425 and the larger (Major) Barn dates from 1476. In the farmyard of which they form part there are other listed buildings, including Abbey Farmhouse, part of which dates from the 14th century, and a small building which is thought to have been the Abbot's stable. Also surviving is the Abbey Guest House, on the east side of the Outer Gateway of the Abbey; now known as Arden's House. Arden's House, now a private residence in Abbey Street, was the location of the infamous murder of Thomas Arden in 1551.

King Stephen in 1154, his wife Matilda in 1152 and son Eustace in 1153, were all buried in the Abbey; two deep pits close to the very centre of the choir were probably the royal tombs. The Abbey Church was excavated in 1964 and the empty graves of King Stephen, his wife and son were found. Their bones are said to have been thrown into Faversham Creek when the building was dismantled. However, in the Parish Church is a canopy tomb with no contemporary inscription where is said that their bones were re-interred.

== School structure ==
The house system was reestablished in 2008 with the aid of a team of students in the Sixth Form, and are represented by a colour along with a patron. The six houses are: Q (patron Cole), E (patron Johnson), G (patron Gibbs), S (patron Wreight), F (patron Fowlds) and K (patron currently undecided). K house was added as a house at the start of the 2023-2024 academic year and has proceeded to expand since then, each of these houses have their own respective colours, those being Q - dark blue, E - Red, G - green, S - Yellow, F - light blue and K - orange .

=== Lower school ===
As of 2024, the lower school has an intake of around 180 students at the beginning of Year Seven (aged 11). The lower schools uniform consists of a navy blue blazer with the school badge on the breast pocket for both boys and girls. Boys should wear a white shirt that can be either long or short sleeved and must be worn with a tie along with black tailored trousers. Girls should wear a white revere style fitted shirt, with the option of the length of the sleeve, a navy blue pleated skirt or tailored navy blue trousers. Socks must be in the colours of navy or black and shoes must be black. Additionally, a dark navy v-neck jumper may be worn, but should contain the school logo and come from the school's official suppliers. As of 2023 the school uniform is not split by gender officially.

=== Sixth form ===
A minimum of 20 offers per year will be made to external applicants.

== Curriculum ==
The school year runs from September to July, split across three terms: the autumn term (September to December), spring term (January to April) and the summer term (April to July). Students receive two weeks off for Christmas and Easter, a six-week summer break, and three "half term" breaks. In terms of the curriculum itself (what the students are learning), unlike most schools in the UK the students at this school choose their options during year 8 and start learning them in year 9.

=== Examination ===
League tables published by the BBC based on 2008 A-level results ranked Queen Elizabeth's as the ninth best school in Kent. According to the BBC, in 2009 A-level students achieved an average of 932.7 QCDA points against a national average of 739.1 and 99% of students achieved five or more grade C results (or equivalent) at GCSE, including Maths and English.

== Extra-curricular activities ==
There are many clubs during lunch break (12:55–1:50) and after school; for most clubs pupils do not have to take part, however occasionally events may happen with these clubs which do require the pupil to pay. There is a wide range of different clubs for different interests, including STEM, History, Computing, Textiles, Sports, Languages and Music. Musical instrument lessons are also on offer, but are not free.

The school's STEM extra-curricular clubs include the lower school's Junior STEM club, and the sixth-form's student-led STEM group, Queen Elizabeth's Science and Technology Society (QuEST).

The school has seen particular success is the F1 in Schools engineering competition, with the team, Evolve UK, becoming World Champions at the 2019 World Finals in Abu Dhabi. Following on from this accomplishment, a new team emerged, known as Eclipse. They became the UK National Champions in 2022 with the opportunity to compete at the 2023 World Finals.

=== QuEST ===
Queen Elizabeth's Science and Technology Society was founded in 2017 by a handful of upper-sixth students with the support of their Physics A-level teachers (who had joined Queen Elizabeth's that year). QuEST annually elects a president and vice-president from its student membership, who (in addition to project leads) work with Science staff to offer fifth- and sixth-formers opportunities to participate in activities across a variety of STEM subject areas. The society is divided into project areas supervised by a student project lead, although pupils may be involved with as many or as few areas as they choose.

In its inaugural year, QuEST started projects such as SpaceQuEST I—the group's first contribution to ESERO's ASGARD: Balloons for Science project as part of ASGARD VII and NanoQuEST—a nanofabrication project in collaboration with North Penn High School in the United States. QuEST has continued to make contributions to subsequent ASGARD projects with SpaceQuEST, has made further progress with NanoQuEST by partnering with the University of Bristol, and has introduced many additional projects focusing on current research. For instance, in biotechnology (BioQuEST), or with the James Webb Space Telescope (SpaceQuEST-IRIS). Other QuEST divisions include MotorQuEST, RoboQuEST, EcoQuEST, BrewQuEST and the school's medical society (MedSoc). The society also organises talks, past speakers have included QEGS alumni studying for PhDs and master's degrees, experts from industry, research scientists and academics, as well as an astronaut visiting from NASA's Jet Propulsion Laboratory.

Current 'QuESTies', staff, and QuEST alumni have regular reunions in the form of their annual Christmas meal.

==== Junior STEM ====
The Junior STEM club, which is facilitated by Science faculty staff, has operated at least since the school's academisation in April 2011. JuniorSTEM meets weekly after school to participate in extra-curricular STEM activities. This has included project work in pursuit of British Science Association CREST Awards and competing in the Greenpower Education Trust's Formula Goblin competition.

QuEST also runs frequent internal events aimed at pupils in the lower school, and hosts external speakers to give talks open to any interested students or staff. Lower school activities have included "The Twelve Days of QuESTmas", "QuEggs Launchers" - an egg–lander-adjacent engineering task, and the popular "Pizza Box Bridge-Building Challenge".

== Notable former pupils ==
- Sir Harry Batterbee GCMG KCVO MA (1880–1976), civil servant and diplomat, first British High Commissioner to New Zealand
- Gordon Boyd (1922 – 2009) actor and TV host
- Darcey Carter (31 May 2005 – present), professional cricketer and Scotland international.
- Momčilo Gavrić (1903–1993), the youngest soldier in World War I, completed his schooling at the Wreight School after the war.
- Claude Hermann Walter Johns (1857–1920), Assyriologist and clergyman
- Sir Robert Magowan KCB CBE (12 September 1967 – present), former Commandant General Royal Marines
- Herbert Marsh (1757 – 1839), bishop
- Sir John Evelyn Vincent Vinelott (1923 – 2006), barrister at the Chancery Bar and an English High Court judge in the Chancery Division from 1978 to 1994.
- Isaac Hempstead Wright (9 April 1999 – present), actor famed for playing Bran Stark in the HBO series Game of Thrones.
