= Faversham Abbey =

Former Cluniac monastery in England

Coordinates: 51°19′00″N 0°53′45″E

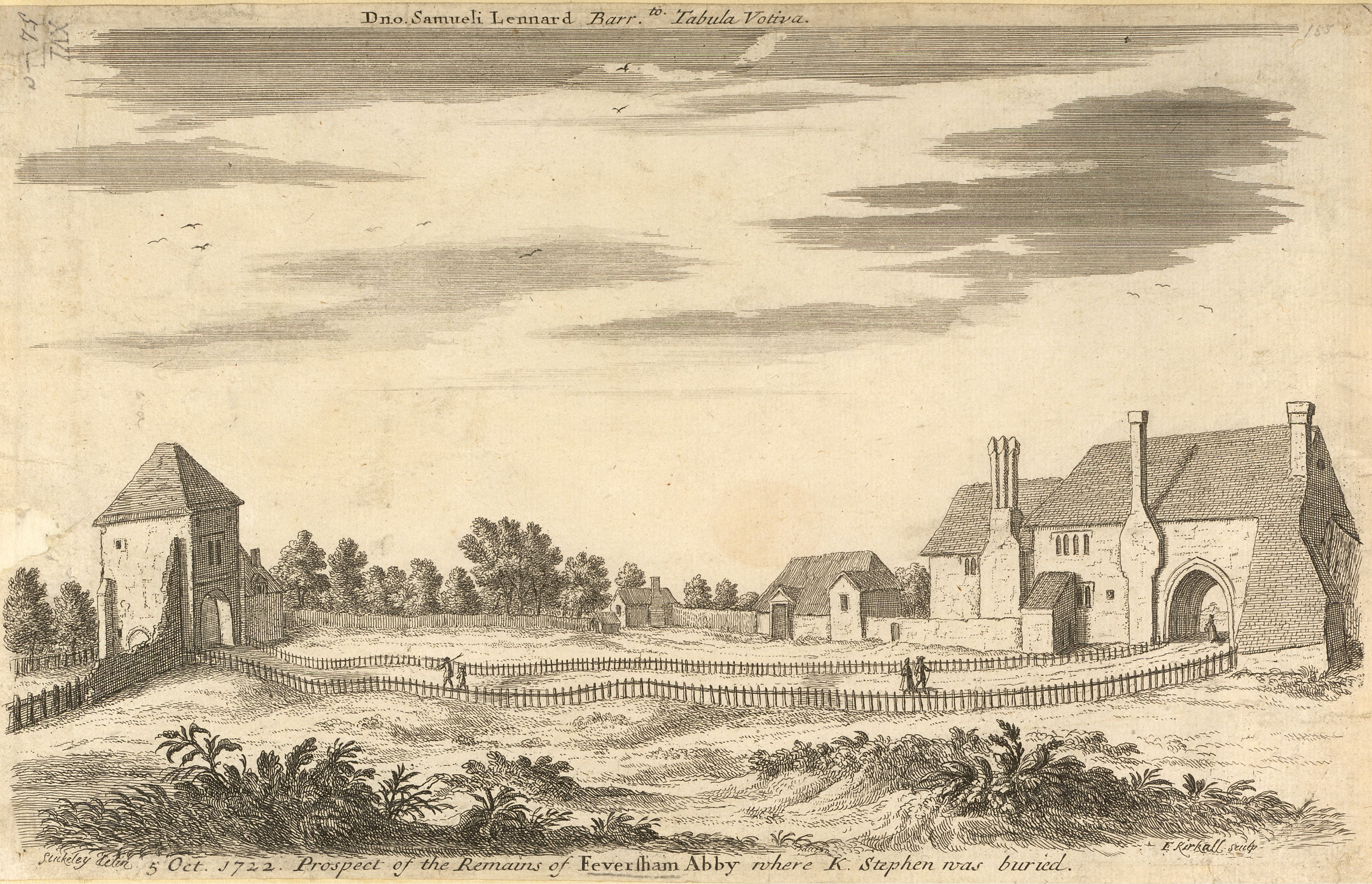
The ruins of Faversham Abbey in 1722.

Faversham Abbey was a Cluniac style monastery immediately to the north-east of the town of Faversham, in north Kent, England.

== History ==
=== Foundation ===
It was founded by King Stephen and Queen Matilda in 1148. A party of monks from Bermondsey Abbey provided the nucleus and the first abbot, Clarembald.

=== Dissolution ===
At the Dissolution of the Monasteries, Sir Thomas Cheney assigned the abbey to Thomas Arden and it was considerably destroyed in 1538. Thereafter the site of the abbey came into the possession of the Sondes family and now lies within the grounds of Queen Elizabeth's Grammar School.

The Abbey was the burial place of King Stephen, Queen Matilda, and their eldest son, Eustace IV of Boulogne. Their bones were reportedly thrown into the nearby Faversham Creek when the abbey was demolished. Their empty tombs were unearthed in 1964 near what had been the centre of the choir. However, there is a canopy tomb with no contemporary inscription in the nearby Parish Church, where it is said that their bones were re-interred.

The Abbey was excavated in 1965 by a team led by the archaeologist Brian Philp. A full plan of the abbey was produced. At around 360 ft (110 m) in length, the abbey was shorter than Canterbury Cathedral, but longer than Rochester Cathedral. The cloister and monastic buildings were built on the northern side.

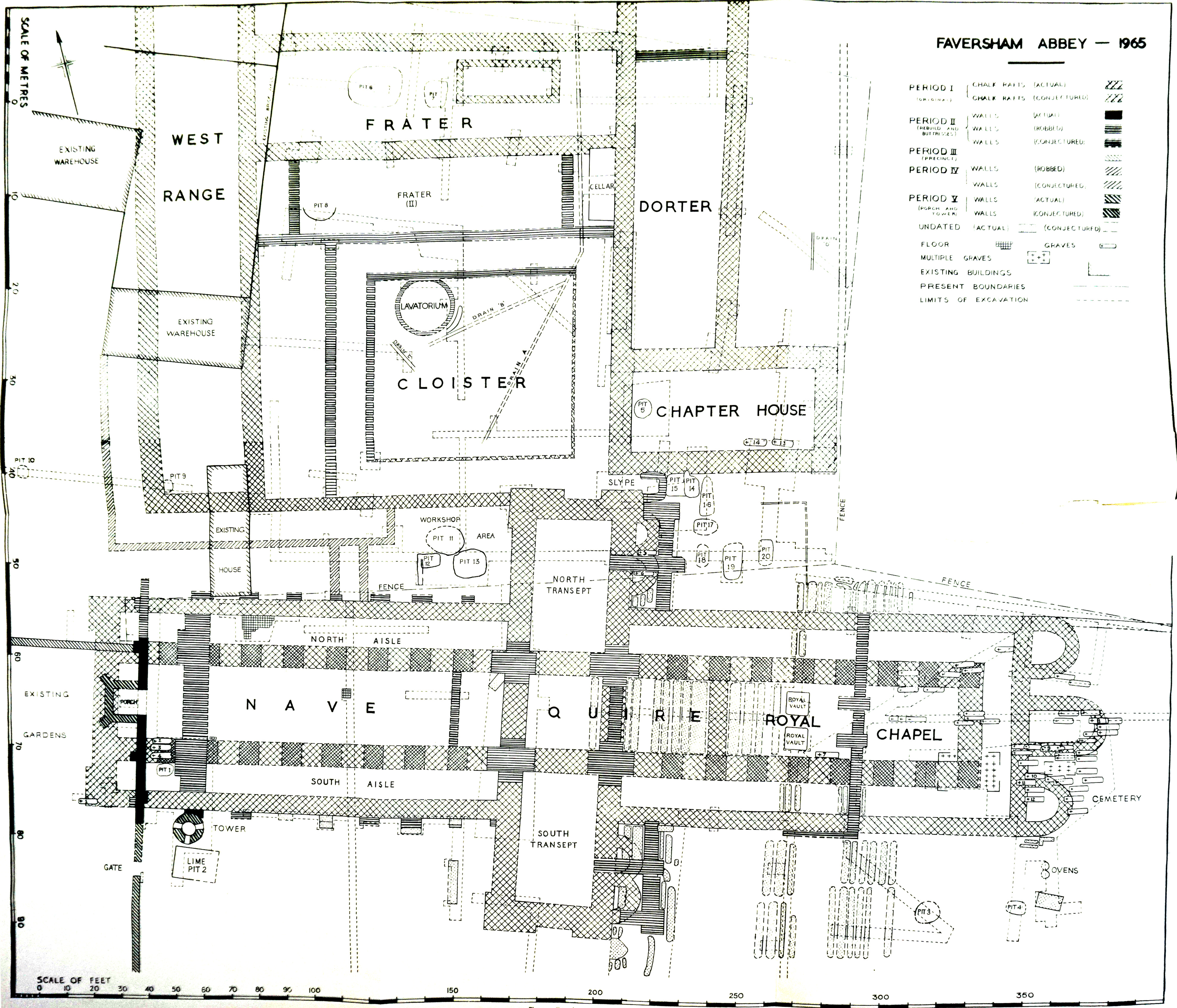
Faversham Abbey Plan from the 1965 excavation

The abbey was built from a mix of chalk, flint, ragstone, greensand, and Caen stone. The roofing material appears to have been slate from south Devon with matches to materials obtained from sites near Modbury and Slapton Sands.

== Archaeology ==
In May, 2019 Kent Archaeological Field School uncovered 150 ft (46 m) long by 50 ft (15 m) wide Roman building at Abbey Farm. According to the Dr Paul Wilkinson, the building contained broken stone walls. The walls covered huge amounts of box flue tiles, which were used to direct hot air up the indoor walls, glazed terracotta floors, an untouched underfloor with hypocaust heating and tons of ceramic roof tiles. Although the plaster painted from these walls were mostly white, plaster walls coloured with green, red and yellow panels were found in the hot sauna room on the north side of the building. The building was divided into two zones of activity – a bath house and a room for agricultural activity.
