= Faversham Without =

Former civil parish in Kent, England

Coordinates: 51.3072°N 0.9237°E

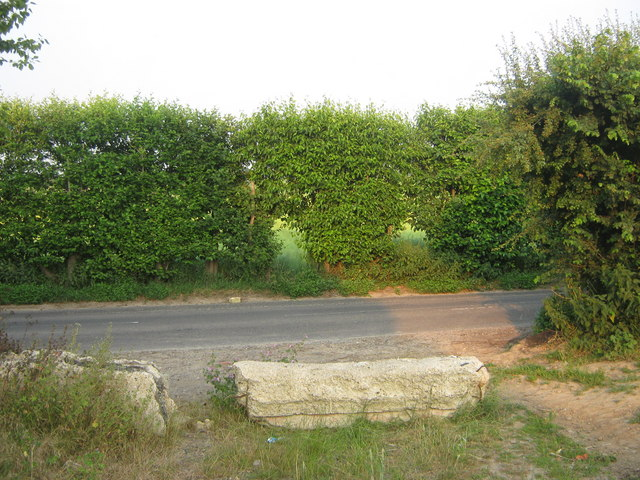
- Footpath crosses Homestall Lane

- Location within Kent
- Population: 111 (1971)
- Civil parish: Graveney with Goodnestone; Boughton under Blean
- District: Swale
- Shire county: Kent
- Region: South East
- Country: England
- Sovereign state: United Kingdom
- Police: Kent
- Fire: Kent
- Ambulance: South East Coast

Faversham Without is a former civil parish, now in the parishes of Graveney with Goodnestone and Boughton under Blean, in the Swale district, in the county of Kent, in southeast England. It was founded in 1894 from the rural part of Faversham parish, over the next 70 years was reduced in size as the borough of Faversham expanded and other areas were transferred to Graveney, Luddenham, Oare and Sheldwich. In 1961 it existed as a series of exclaves. It was abolished on 1 April 1983 when the parish of "Graveney with Goodnestone" was formed part also went to Boughton under Blean. In 1971 the parish had a population of 111.
