= Buckland-by-Faversham =

Former civil parish in Kent, England

Coordinates: 51.323°N 0.84°E

Buckland
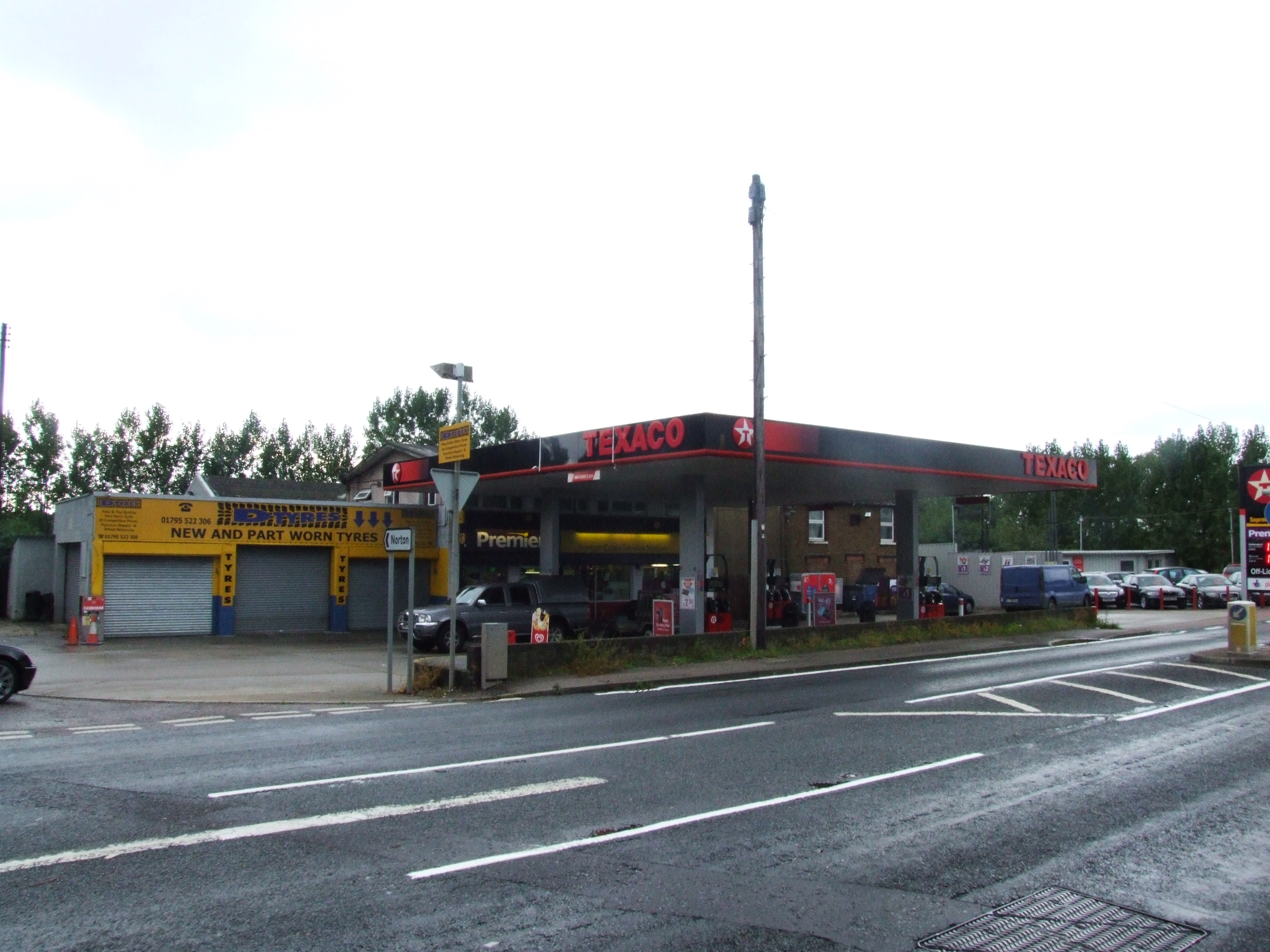
- Norton Cross Service Station

- Location within Kent
- Civil parish: Norton, Buckland and Stone
- District: Swale
- Shire county: Kent
- Region: South East
- Country: England
- Sovereign state: United Kingdom
- Police: Kent
- Fire: Kent
- Ambulance: South East Coast

Buckland is a former civil parish, now in the parish of Norton, Buckland and Stone, in the Swale district, in the county of Kent, England. The parish church no longer exists, and is covered by the church at Norton.

== History ==
In 1971 the parish had a population of 74. On 1 April 2001 the parish was abolished to form "Norton, Buckland and Stone".
