= Faversham Almshouses =

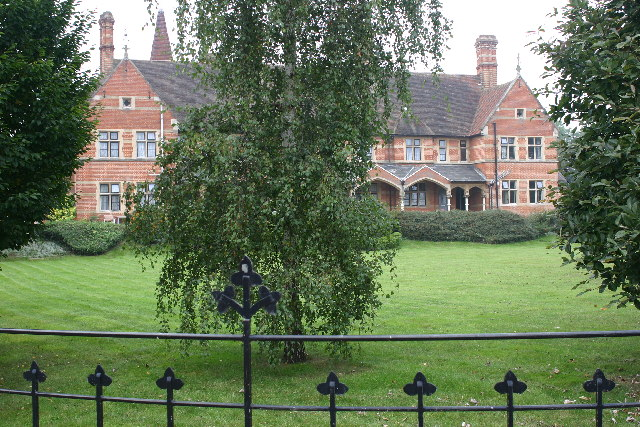

- Location within Kent
- 51°18′53″N 0°53′05″E
- Location: Faversham, Kent, England

History
- Built: 1863

Listed Building – Grade II

Faversham Almshouses are Grade II-listed almshouses in Faversham, Kent. They are operated by the trustees of Faversham Municipal Charities.

== History ==
Almshouses for six widows were founded and endowed by Thomas Mendfield in 1614.

In 1721 Thomas Napleton founded and endowed houses for six men.

In 1840, Henry Wreight, local solicitor and former Mayor of Faversham, gave a bequest which enabled the rebuilding of the almshouses on a grand scale. The architects were Hooker and Wheeler of Brenchley, Kent and the rebuilding was complete by 1863. The builder was G W Chinnock Bros of Southampton.

The accommodation was modernised in 1982 at a cost of £1 million (about £3.57 million as of 2025).

== List of chaplains ==
- J. H. Talbot 1867–1870
- William Francis Hobson 1870–1881
- Henry Eldridge Curtis 1881–????
- Joseph Henry Miles 1922–1930
- Canon Tony Oehring
