= Norton, Buckland and Stone =

Civil parish in Kent, England

Coordinates: 51.32°N 0.82°E

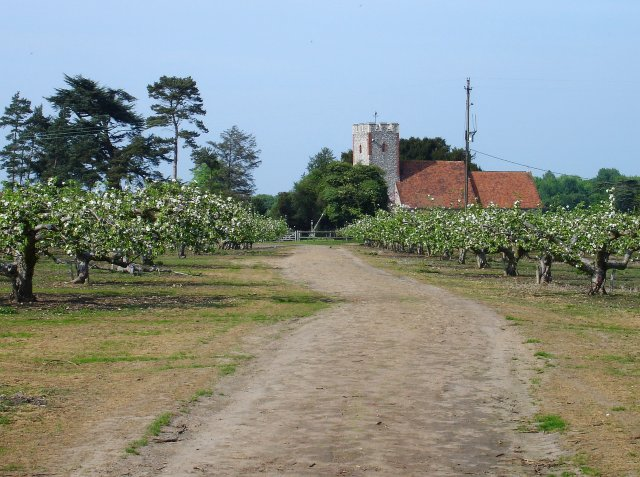
- The Kentish Church of St Mary in the orchard

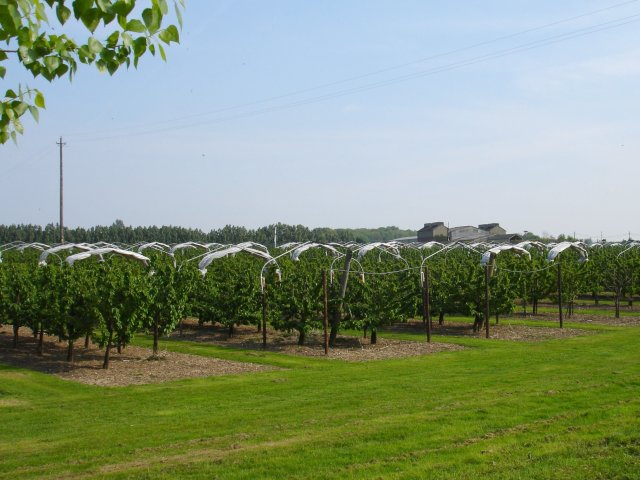
- Cherry orchard at Norton

- Location within Kent
- Population: 498 (in 2021)
- Civil parish: Norton, Buckland and Stone
- District: Swale
- Shire county: Kent
- Region: South East
- Country: England
- Sovereign state: United Kingdom
- Post town: Sittingbourne
- Postcode district: ME9
- Post town: Faversham
- Postcode district: ME13
- Dialling code: 01227
- Police: Kent
- Fire: Kent
- Ambulance: South East Coast
- UK Parliament: Faversham and Mid Kent

Norton, Buckland and Stone is a small rural civil parish, 1 mile (1.6 km) east of Teynham and 3 miles (4.8 km) west of the centre of Faversham, in the borough of Swale, Kent, England. Its settlements are the hamlets of Norton Ash and Lewson Street.

The parish is bypassed by the M2 to the south and is crossed by the historic A2 road, on the route of the Roman road of Watling Street. At the 2021 census the parish population was 498.

== Norton Ash and Lewson Street ==
=== History and buildings ===
In 1798, Edward Hasted records that Norton was written in "ancient" records as 'Northtune'.

The manor was previously owned by Odo, Earl of Kent (as the Bishop of Bayeux), at the time of the Domesday Book in 1086, when it was recorded as Nortone. The parish had three churches, and three mills without tallage (land tax), and two fisheries of twelve pence. There was woodland for the pannage (grazing) of forty hogs.

After his trial (for fraud) in 1076, Odo's assets were re-apportioned. The parish returned to the crown who passed it to 'Hugo de Port'. Then it passed to John de Campania (of Newenham), with a rent of 30 shillings going to Rochester Castle. In 1790, it passed to John Bennett, esquire of Faversham.

This central area constitutes the main settlement with the parish church. The two most populated roads of the parish are Lewson Street Road, forming with one side road a distinct, largely thatched roof hamlet with the relatively large public house, 'The Plough', and the oldest listed cottage, World's End, both 16th century, and the mainly agricultural nearby Norton Road. On the latter are Norton Court, listed grade II*, dating to the 17th century and remodelled by architect Sir Reginald Blomfield; and Norton Court Lodge, grade II. The church lies along a straight east–west footpath from the Court leading to a large house named Provender, listed grade II* and dating to the 16th century.

=== Parish church ===
The flint church of St Mary is Grade I listed. Most parts date between the 12th and 14th centuries. It is within the diocese of Canterbury, and deanery of Ospringe. It features partly restored 13th-century triple lancet windows with ogee doorway and 14th century trefoil headed lancet windows with ogee surrounds. It contains a Biblically inspired pictorial white memorial to Rt Hon Mary Elizabeth, Lady Sondes (died 1818) and one to George Finch who died in 1584.

== Buckland ==
Once named in Latin deeds as 'Bocheland' (book land), the Manor of Buckland was also under the control of Odo, Earl of Kent. It was later granted to the family of Crevequer.

It had its own church, which was dedicated to St. Nicholas, which was a ruin in 1798. It had a spire, which was still standing in 1719.

250 m east along the A2 Provender Lane branches off, facing which are Buckland Cottages and opposite is the Cricket Green on the Lane's west side; along that lane lie the (Grade II listed) Old Rectory, Barbary Farmhouse (also Grade II listed) and Coronation Cottages, finally the lane passes Provender Court, Provender Farm and further cottages, turning west and rejoining Norton Road close to Lewson Street. The lane is surrounded by orchards and has an oast house, similar to Norton Road.

== Historic Stone ==
Stone, or Stone-next-Faversham, found close to Ospringe in the east has just a cottage, a farm and its Anglo-Saxon chapel, which is a scheduled ancient monument.

Once named in ancient Latin deeds as 'Stanes'.

Edward Hasted, refers to it as "a small obscure parish, hardly known to anyone". The parish was under the control of the manor of Elverton in Luddenham, Kent. Elverton is written in the Domesday survey as 'Ernolton', and in other Latin deeds as 'Eylwartone'. The chapel was called 'the chapel of our Lady of Eylwarton'. Which is within the diocese of Canterbury, and deanery of Ospringe. In 1227, the chapel appears in the 'Black Book' (Fasti Ecclesiae Anglicanae) of the archdeacon of Canterbury 'Stephen Langton'.

English Heritage's Maison Dieu (in Ospringe), is a museum, housing archaeological finds from the chapel and from the Roman cemetery of the town of Durolevum, the westerly predecessor to Faversham.

== Sports and amenities ==
There is a cricket section and football section of the sports club on Provender Lane, on an "open space [that] has been and will always be one to be enjoyed by the local children and older members of the parish". There is a village hall providing social clubs and leisure activities.

From the 1930s until 1942, there was a water softening plant in the south of the parish, about midway to Painter's Forstal. It has since been converted to a private home, known as the 'Lime Works'.

== Transport ==
The nearest motorway junction is at Faversham, and the nearest railway station is in Teynham, 1 mile (1.6 km) to the west.
