= Mockbeggar, Swale =

Hamlet in Kent, England

Coordinates: 51.325°N 0.83°E

Mockbeggar
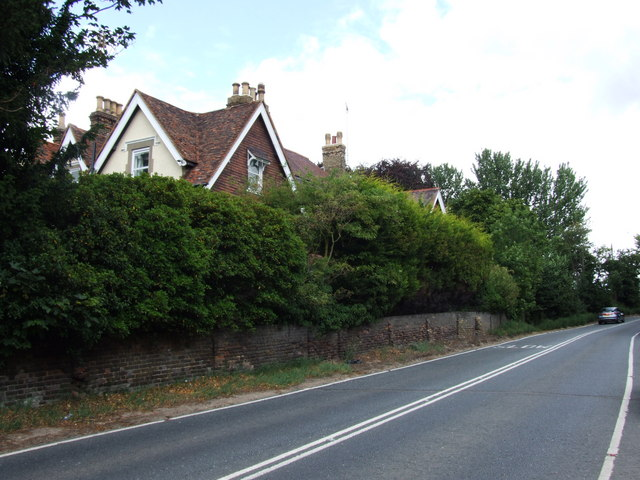
- Town Road

- Location within Kent
- OS grid reference: TQ973622
- District: Swale
- Shire county: Kent
- Region: South East
- Country: England
- Sovereign state: United Kingdom
- Post town: Sittingbourne
- Postcode district: ME9
- Police: Kent
- Fire: Kent
- Ambulance: South East Coast

Mockbeggar is a hamlet lying north of the A2 road to the east of Teynham in Swale in Kent, England. It is in the civil parish of Norton, Buckland and Stone.
