= Faversham Parish Church =

- The Parish Church of St Mary of Charity
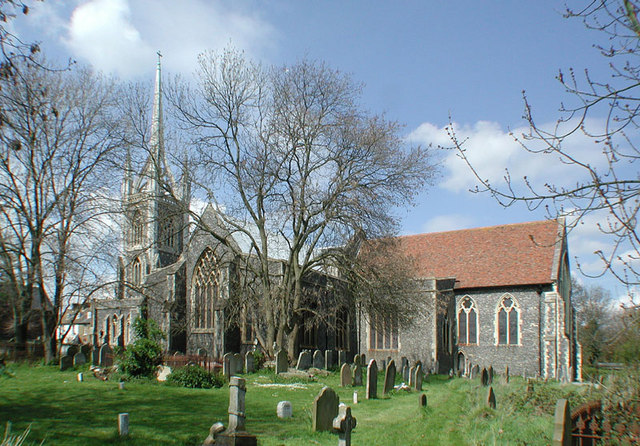
- Faversham Parish Church
- 51°19′02″N 0°53′41″E
- OS grid reference: TR 01822 61535
- Location: Faversham, Kent
- Country: England
- Denomination: Church of England
- Website: www.stmaryofcharity.org//

Administration
- Diocese: Canterbury

Clergy
- Priest: Revd Simon Rowlands

St Mary of Charity, Faversham Parish Church is the Church of England parish church of the town of Faversham in Kent, England. The church spire dominates the town's skyline and is visible from some distance.

== History and description ==
The church is all that remains of a previously much larger religious community around Faversham Abbey which was established in 1147 by King Stephen and dissolved by Henry VIII.

Although the church itself was founded in the medieval era, the flying spire, known as a crown or corona spire, by which it is recognised dates to the 18th century - a period of prosperity for the town of Faversham. The church itself is much larger than might be expected and is reputed to be the second largest in Kent, after All Saints Church, Maidstone. This gives the church a distinctive acoustic and, unusually among parish churches, makes it large enough to hold a symphony orchestra for concerts. The interior was restored and transformed by Sir George Gilbert Scott, known for his St Pancras Station, the Foreign Office and many college and cathedral buildings, in 1874.

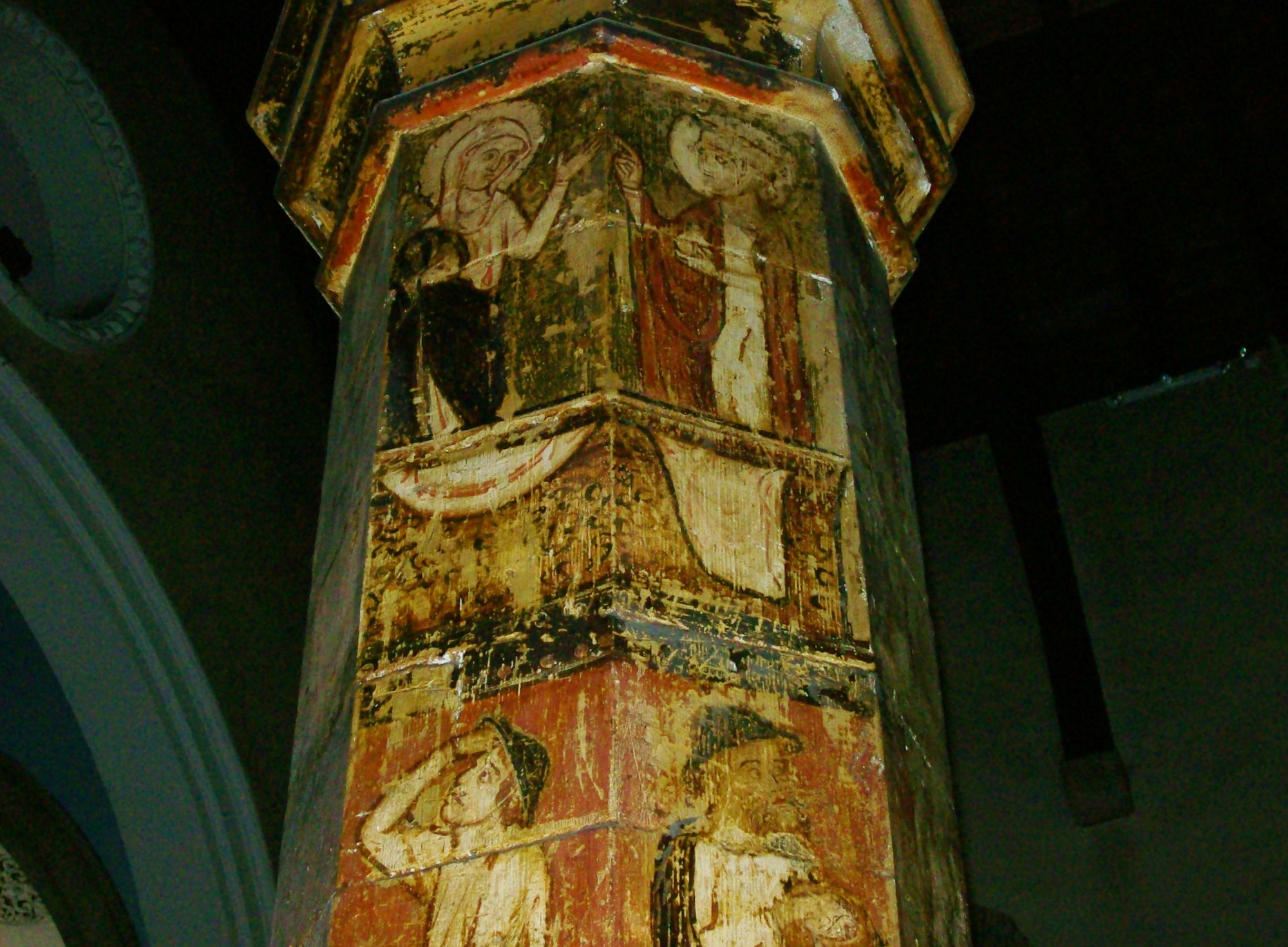
The painted pillar - a rare medieval survivor

Notable features of the church include the reputed tomb of King Stephen (the church is thus one of only a few churches outside London where an English king was interred), nationally important misericords in the Quire, a rare medieval painted pillar and a recently installed altar dedicated to Saints Crispin and Crispinian.

Its clock was built by James William Benson.

In 1950 it was listed Grade I by English Heritage.

Music

The church supports a strong choral tradition with a choir of adults and children who sing Anglican Matins, Evensong and Communion. The current Director of Music is Benjamin Saul. The choir is affiliated with the RSCM and currently has three singers who hold the highest RSCM award, the Gold Award.
