= Grade II* listed buildings in Swale =

There are over 20,000 Grade II* listed buildings in England. This page is a list of these buildings in the district of Swale in Kent.

== Swale ==
Name	Location	Type	Completed (Note: The date given is the date used by Historic England as significant for the initial building or that of an important part in the structure's description.)	Date designated	Grid ref. (Note: Sometimes known as OSGB36, the grid reference is based on the British national grid reference system used by the Ordnance Survey.) Geo-coordinates	Entry number (Note: The "List Entry Number" is a unique number assigned to each listed building and scheduled monument by Historic England.)	Image
Church of St Leonard	Badlesmere, Swale	Parish Church	13th century	24 January 1967	TR0138755096; 51°15′34″N 0°53′06″E	1069922	Church of St Leonard More images
Borden Hall	Borden	House	17th century	27 August 1952	TQ8820963019; 51°20′06″N 0°42′02″E	1185884	Upload Photo
Hook's Hole	Borden	Hall House	15th century	27 August 1952	TQ8760863898; 51°20′36″N 0°41′32″E	1069424	Upload Photo
Olstede	Borden	House	17th century	27 August 1952	TQ8755863860; 51°20′34″N 0°41′30″E	1069383	Upload Photo
Yew Tree Cottage	Borden	House	16th century to 17th century	24 January 1967	TQ8686262154; 51°19′40″N 0°40′51″E	1343887	Upload Photo
Colkins	Clockhouse, Boughton under Blean	House	1729	27 August 1952	TR0336059256; 51°17′46″N 0°54′56″E	1069131	Colkins More images
Hall Cottage	Boughton under Blean	Wealden House	16th century	24 January 1967	TR0559257704; 51°16′53″N 0°56′48″E	1344002	Hall Cottage More images
Nash Court	Boughton under Blean	House	Restored before 1878	21 May 1986	TR0470459936; 51°18′06″N 0°56′07″E	1069133	Upload Photo
Style House	Boughton Street, Boughton under Blean	Continuous Jetty House	16th century	27 August 1952	TR0554359470; 51°17′50″N 0°56′49″E	1069156	Upload Photo
Walls about 20 to 60 Metres South East of Colkins	Clockhouse, Boughton under Blean	Wall	Early 18th century	21 May 1986	TR0340159215; 51°17′45″N 0°54′58″E	1069132	Walls about 20 to 60 Metres South East of Colkins
Walnut Tree House	Boughton under Blean	Wealden House	15th century	27 August 1952	TR0546857799; 51°16′56″N 0°56′42″E	1325973	Walnut Tree House More images
Bexon Manor	Bexon, Bredgar	Jettied House	15th century	27 August 1952	TQ8898459478; 51°18′11″N 0°42′35″E	1069395	Bexon Manor More images
Brickwall and Railings to Forecourt	Bredgar	Timber Framed House	17th century	24 January 1967	TQ8796360251; 51°18′37″N 0°41′44″E	1299305	Upload Photo
Chantry House	Bredgar	House	1984	24 January 1967	TQ8798260406; 51°18′42″N 0°41′45″E	1069369	Chantry House
Swanton Street Farmhouse	Swanton Street, Bredgar	Farmhouse	Earlier	27 August 1952	TQ8755059319; 51°18′08″N 0°41′21″E	1069371	Upload Photo
Ruins of Shurland Hall or Castle	Eastchurch	Castle	Earlier	14 May 1952	TQ9942171550; 51°24′28″N 0°51′58″E	1258505	Ruins of Shurland Hall or Castle More images
Box Cottage	Eastling	House	Early 19th century	24 January 1967	TQ9637856494; 51°16′25″N 0°48′50″E	1054867	Upload Photo
Church of St Mary	Eastling	Parish Church	12th century	24 January 1967	TQ9652256555; 51°16′27″N 0°48′58″E	1343974	Church of St Mary More images
Eastling Manor	Eastling	House	1616	27 August 1952	TQ9626356518; 51°16′26″N 0°48′45″E	1069239	Eastling Manor More images
Abbey Farmhouse	Faversham	Farmhouse	13th century or Early 14th century	3 August 1972	TR0209561831; 51°19′11″N 0°53′56″E	1060995	Upload Photo
Arden's House	Faversham	Abbey	Presumably Medieval	29 July 1950	TR0182861729; 51°19′08″N 0°53′42″E	1186199	Arden's House More images
Church of St Catherine	Preston-by-Faversham, Faversham	Parish Church	Pre-conquest origins	29 July 1950	TR0168260768; 51°18′37″N 0°53′32″E	1115766	Church of St Catherine More images
Cooksditch	Faversham	House	18th century	29 July 1950	TR0177261320; 51°18′55″N 0°53′38″E	1069457	Upload Photo
Davington Priory	Davington, Faversham	Cloister	Founded 1153	29 July 1950	TR0109261743; 51°19′09″N 0°53′04″E	1069404	Davington Priory More images
Faversham Abbey Major Barn	Faversham	Abbey	c. 1500	3 August 1972	TR0211161762; 51°19′09″N 0°53′57″E	1344267	Faversham Abbey Major Barn More images
Fremlins Offices (including East Wing and Billiard Room)	Faversham	House	18th century	29 July 1950	TR0166361512; 51°19′01″N 0°53′33″E	1069489	Upload Photo
Gillett's Granaries	Faversham	Granary		29 July 1950	TR0196361940; 51°19′15″N 0°53′49″E	1115576	Gillett's Granaries More images
Mediaeval Stables at Abbey Farm	Faversham	Stable	14th century or 15th century	17 January 1989	TR0216461803; 51°19′10″N 0°53′59″E	1268252	Upload Photo
Queen Court Farmhouse and Outbuildings	Ospringe, Faversham	Farmhouse	15th century	29 July 1950	TR0015560464; 51°18′29″N 0°52′13″E	1360992	Queen Court Farmhouse and Outbuildings More images
The Guildhall	Faversham	Local Government Office	1603	29 July 1950	TR0157161382; 51°18′57″N 0°53′28″E	1343844	The Guildhall More images
The Maison Dieu Museum	Ospringe, Faversham	Public House	1950	29 July 1950	TR0036260855; 51°18′41″N 0°52′25″E	1069431	The Maison Dieu Museum More images
Faversham Munitions Explosion Memorial	Faversham	Grave	1917	27 September 1989	TR0250360871; 51°18′41″N 0°54′16″E	1261010	Faversham Munitions Explosion Memorial More images
The Masonic Hall	Faversham	Grammar School	Founded 1527	29 July 1950	TR0185161636; 51°19′05″N 0°53′43″E	1344229	Upload Photo
The Training Ship Hasarde	Faversham	Warehouse	15th century	29 July 1950	TR0158461615; 51°19′05″N 0°53′29″E	1116391	The Training Ship Hasarde More images
87 To 92 Abbey Street	Faversham	House	18th century	29 July 1950	TR0177361664; 51°19′06″N 0°53′39″E	1061013	Upload Photo
121 West Street	Faversham	House	Dated 1697	29 July 1950	TR0153261386; 51°18′57″N 0°53′26″E	1067608	Upload Photo
1 The Market Place	Faversham	House	18th century	29 July 1950	TR0154861377; 51°18′57″N 0°53′27″E	1069462	Upload Photo
5 and 6 The Market Place	Faversham	Jettied House	15th century possibly earlier	29 July 1950	TR0156261398; 51°18′58″N 0°53′28″E	1343845	Upload Photo
15 Ospringe Street	Ospringe, Faversham	Hospital	1230	29 July 1950	TR0038060850; 51°18′41″N 0°52′25″E	1069430	Upload Photo
81 Abbey Street	Faversham	Abbey	15th century	29 July 1950	TR0181761715; 51°19′07″N 0°53′41″E	1344235	Upload Photo
84 Abbey Street	Faversham	House	c. 1589	29 July 1950	TR0179261682; 51°19′06″N 0°53′40″E	1240604	Upload Photo
Ewell Farmhouse	Graveney with Goodnestone	Hall House	14th century or 15th century	24 January 1967	TR0353760848; 51°18′37″N 0°55′08″E	1325225	Upload Photo
Goodnestone Court	Graveney with Goodnestone	Continuous Jetty House	15th century	27 August 1952	TR0447661657; 51°19′02″N 0°55′58″E	1107863	Goodnestone Court More images
Barrows Cottages	Hartlip, Swale	House	18th century	24 January 1967	TQ8386164009; 51°20′44″N 0°38′19″E	1319991	Upload Photo
Queendown Warren	Queendown Warren, Hartlip	Continuous Jetty House	c. 1560	27 August 1952	TQ8264563016; 51°20′13″N 0°37′14″E	1069375	Upload Photo
Warren Cottage	Queendown Warren, Hartlip	House	19th century	27 November 1984	TQ8323262875; 51°20′08″N 0°37′44″E	1116349	Upload Photo
Dargate House	Dargate, Hernhill	House	Early 19th century	24 January 1967	TR0751861941; 51°19′07″N 0°58′36″E	1344025	Upload Photo
Manor House	Hernhill Green, Hernhill	Continuous Jetty House	15th century	24 January 1967	TR0653860684; 51°18′28″N 0°57′43″E	1323023	Manor House More images
Church of St Laurence	Leaveland	Parish Church	13th century	24 January 1967	TR0048854850; 51°15′27″N 0°52′19″E	1054051	Church of St Laurence More images
Leaveland Court	Leaveland	Continuous Jetty House	15th century	27 August 1952	TR0038954852; 51°15′27″N 0°52′14″E	1054067	Leaveland Court More images
Church of St Thomas the Apostle	Harty, Leysdown	Church	11th century or early 12th century	27 June 1963	TR0231366279; 51°21′34″N 0°54′16″E	1258076	Church of St Thomas the Apostle More images
Bogle with Garden Wall	Lynsted with Kingsdown	House	c. 1643	27 August 1952	TQ9474261452; 51°19′08″N 0°47′36″E	1106389	Bogle with Garden Wall More images
Bumpit	Lynsted with Kingsdown	House	16th century	24 January 1967	TQ9499161193; 51°18′59″N 0°47′48″E	1334371	Bumpit More images
Claxfield Farmhouse	Lynsted with Kingsdown	House	Later	21 March 1985	TQ9443562562; 51°19′44″N 0°47′22″E	1343922	Claxfield Farmhouse More images
Lynsted Park and adjacent Garden Walls	Lynsted Park, Lynsted with Kingsdown	House	1599	27 August 1952	TQ9471359655; 51°18′10″N 0°47′31″E	1069310	Upload Photo
Sunderland Farmhouse	Lynsted with Kingsdown	Continuous Jetty House	16th century	27 August 1952	TQ9425961657; 51°19′15″N 0°47′11″E	1343923	Sunderland Farmhouse More images
The Malthouse	Lynsted with Kingsdown	Continuous Jetty House	Late 16th century	27 August 1952	TQ9490361904; 51°19′22″N 0°47′45″E	1343929	Upload Photo
Church of St Mary and the Holy Cross	Milstead	Parish Church	C12-C13	24 January 1967	TQ9035858760; 51°17′46″N 0°43′44″E	1069286	Church of St Mary and the Holy Cross More images
Milstead Manor	Milstead	Continuous Jetty House	16th century	27 August 1952	TQ9041458726; 51°17′45″N 0°43′47″E	1343916	Milstead Manor More images
Calico House	Newnham	House	18th century	27 August 1952	TQ9520857612; 51°17′03″N 0°47′52″E	1069247	Calico House More images
Champion Court	Newnham	House	1952	27 August 1952	TQ9558657984; 51°17′15″N 0°48′12″E	1343938	Upload Photo
Church of St Peter and St Paul	Newnham	Parish Church	c. 1200	24 January 1967	TQ9540157627; 51°17′03″N 0°48′02″E	1055749	Church of St Peter and St Paul More images
Foxenden Manor	Foxenden, Newnham	Farmhouse	1604	27 August 1952	TQ9445156554; 51°16′30″N 0°47′11″E	1366585	Foxenden Manor
Provender	Norton, Buckland and Stone	Jettied House	16th century	27 August 1952	TQ9737960801; 51°18′43″N 0°49′51″E	1374517	Provender More images
Homeside with Railings to Forecourt	Oare	House	Early 19th century	21 May 1986	TR0065362964; 51°19′49″N 0°52′44″E	1344016	Upload Photo
Church of St Peter and St Paul	Ospringe	Parish Church	c. 1200	29 July 1950	TR0002860311; 51°18′24″N 0°52′06″E	1343988	Church of St Peter and St Paul More images
The Old Vicarage	Ospringe	House	17th century	3 August 1972	TR0008960190; 51°18′20″N 0°52′09″E	1354736	Upload Photo
Parish Church of the Holy Trinity	Queenborough	Tower	West tower dating from 11th century	19 October 1951	TQ9091772306; 51°25′03″N 0°44′39″E	1258500	Parish Church of the Holy Trinity More images
Saffery Farmhouse	Owen's Court, Selling	Cross Wing House	15th century	27 August 1952	TR0297257796; 51°16′59″N 0°54′33″E	1344044	Saffery Farmhouse
Church of St James	Sheldwich	Parish Church	12th century	24 January 1967	TR0113356863; 51°16′31″N 0°52′56″E	1049130	Church of St James More images
Throwley House	Sheldwich	House	17th century or 18th century	2 November 1978	TR0105556839; 51°16′31″N 0°52′52″E	1344050	Upload Photo
Church of St Mary	Stalisfield	Parish Church	13th century	24 January 1967	TQ9673852434; 51°14′14″N 0°49′01″E	1025295	Church of St Mary More images
Frognal Farmhouse and Garden Wall	Teynham	House	1668	27 August 1952	TQ9484063391; 51°20′10″N 0°47′45″E	1069261	Frognal Farmhouse and Garden Wall More images
Garden Pavilion at Belmont Park (TQ 984 567)	Belmont, Throwley	Summerhouse	18th century	28 August 1986	TQ9836556708; 51°16′30″N 0°50′33″E	1069173	Upload Photo
Snoad Street Manor	Snoadstreet, Throwley	House	15th century or earlier	27 August 1952	TQ9921252434; 51°14′11″N 0°51′08″E	1203485	Upload Photo
Bax Farmhouse	Tonge	House	1567	27 August 1952	TQ9435963823; 51°20′25″N 0°47′21″E	1338557	Upload Photo
Newberry Farmhouse	Tonge	House	17th century	24 January 1967	TQ9279859946; 51°18′21″N 0°45′53″E	1069267	Upload Photo
Gore Farmhouse	Upchurch	Farmhouse	1984	27 November 1984	TQ8435666516; 51°22′04″N 0°38′49″E	1069318	Upload Photo
Archway House Building Number 23	Sheerness Dockyard	Carpenters Workshop	1824-1830	1 August 1968	TQ9106275137; 51°26′35″N 0°44′52″E	1258986	Upload Photo
Church of St Michael	Sittingbourne	School	Change of use early 19th century	10 September 1951	TQ9093463615; 51°20′22″N 0°44′23″E	1061030	Church of St Michael More images
Former North Saw Pits Building Number 84	Sheerness Dockyard	Saw Pit	1828	25 April 1994	TQ9098775361; 51°26′42″N 0°44′49″E	1243244	Upload Photo
Former Royal Dockyard Church and Attached Wall and Railings	Sheerness Dockyard	Gate Pier	1828	7 December 1966	TQ9146175154; 51°26′35″N 0°45′13″E	1273239	Former Royal Dockyard Church and Attached Wall and Railings More images
Former Working Mast House Building Number 26	Sheerness Dockyard	Boat House	1821-1826	13 August 1999	TQ9087474922; 51°26′28″N 0°44′42″E	1244509	Upload Photo
Medway Ports Authority Offices (Dockyard House)	Sheerness Dockyard	Office	1977	15 March 1977	TQ9134775179; 51°26′36″N 0°45′07″E	1258883	Upload Photo
Numbers 1 to 15 and attached Railings	Sheerness Dockyard	House	1999	15 March 1977	TQ9134375114; 51°26′34″N 0°45′07″E	1258881	Upload Photo
Numbers 1 to 8 Attached Basement Railings, Walls, Coach House and Stables	Sheerness Dockyard	Terrace	1824-1827	15 March 1977	TQ9147475086; 51°26′33″N 0°45′14″E	1258879	Upload Photo
Walls and Gates of the Boat Basin, Docks Number 4 5 and Slipway	Sheerness Dockyard, Swale	Wall	c. 1814	15 March 1977	TQ9085375334; 51°26′41″N 0°44′42″E	1255552	Upload Photo
The Court House	Milton Regis	Court House	c. 1450	10 September 1951	TQ9037964734; 51°20′59″N 0°43′57″E	1344240	The Court House More images
49 and 51 High Street	Sittingbourne	House	18th century	10 September 1951	TQ9078463614; 51°20′23″N 0°44′16″E	1352683	49 and 51 High Street
Memorial to the Home of Aviation	Eastchurch	Memorial	1955	30 June 1978	TQ9883271385; 51°24′24″N 0°51′27″E	1258069	Memorial to the Home of Aviation More images
