= Faversham Munitions Explosion Memorial =

Memorial in Faversham, Kent, England

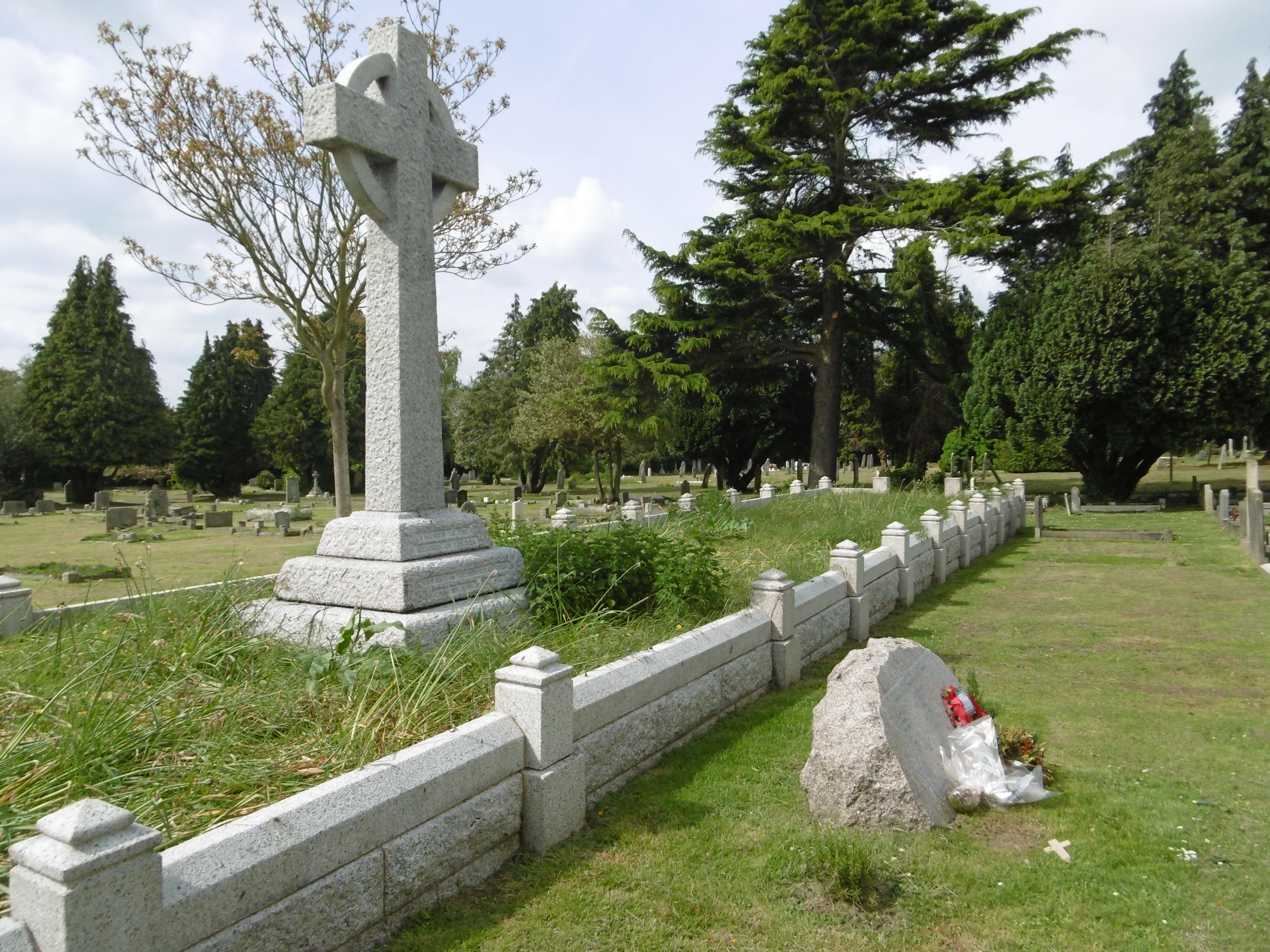
Mass grave in Faversham Cemetery

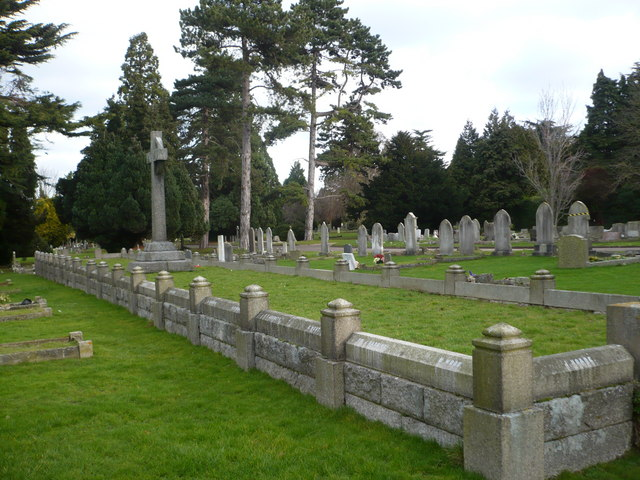
Mass grave in Faversham Cemetery

The memorial to the victims of the 1916 Faversham Munitions Explosion is a Grade II* listed building in Love Lane cemetery, in Faversham, Kent. Unveiled in 1917, it incorporates a granite Celtic cross and the granite structures surrounding a mass grave for 73 people killed by the Faversham explosion on 2 April 1916, and a nearby freestanding stone which records the names of another 35 who were buried elsewhere. The memorial became a Grade II listed building in 1989, and was upgraded to Grade II* in March 2016 just before the centenary of the explosion.

== Background ==
The first gunpowder factory in England was established at Faversham in the 16th century. The Faversham explosives industry remained important at the time of the First World War, when the Explosives Loading Company established factory number 7 on the salt marsh at Uplees nearby, to make TNT charges for shells and mines.

Despite many safety measures to prevent sparks, a fire broke out on Sunday 2 April 1916 at Building 833, a wooden shed which contained 15 tons of TNT and 150 tons of ammonium nitrate. The cause of the fire remains unclear: an initial report delivered on 17 April, just two weeks later, attributed it to sparks from a fault at a nearby boiler house setting light to empty linen sacks used to transport explosives which had been piled up against the shed. This attribution was later upheld in the official report by a committee headed by the Minister of Munitions, David Lloyd George.

Workers and firemen desperately fought to put out the fire, and to remove the explosives from the vicinity, but to little avail: there were three large explosions at about 2:20pm, excavating a large crater some 120 ft (37 m) across and 20 ft (6.1 m) deep. A worse disaster was averted: several thousand tons of TNT stored elsewhere on the site did not explode. At least 108 men and boys were killed - none of the plant's female workers were present at the weekend - the youngest aged 17 and 18 and the oldest in their 60s. The dead included all of the factory's fire brigade, 20 workers from the neighbouring Cotton Powder Company who came to assist, and six soldiers from the 4th Battalion, The Buffs (East Kent Regiment), that formed the site's military guard. Many of the remains could not be identified, and another seven people were recorded missing. Almost 100 others were injured. The detonation broke windows in Southend, 15 mi (24 km) away across the Thames Estuary, and it was heard over 100 mi (160 km) away, with reports from Norwich and France.

The disaster remained relatively unknown due to wartime press censorship. Many bodies were buried together at Love Lane cemetery in Faversham on Thursday 6 April 1917, at a service conducted by the Archbishop of Canterbury Randall Davidson, with further burials on 7 and 8 April. In all, 73 were interred in the mass grave, but only 34 could be identified, with the others recorded as "male person unknown". The families of another 35 victims elected to bury their bodies elsewhere.

The factory was quickly rebuilt and returned to production.

== Memorial ==
The mass grave is a long rectangular block about 10 m × 50 m (33 ft × 164 ft) orientated north–south, surrounded by a low granite kerb punctuated by low capped piers, with urns on pillars to either side of steps at each end. In the centre of the block is a free-standing granite Celtic cross standing on three steps, about 3.8 m (12 ft) high, with an inscription "SACRED TO THE / MEMORY OF THE MEN / WHO DIED IN THE SERVICE OF THEIR / COUNTRY 2ND. APRIL 1916. // ‘FATHER IN THY GRACIOUS KEEPING / LEAVE NOW THY SERVANTS SLEEPING.’ ". The quotation is taken from the 1870 hymn "Now the labourer's task is o'er" by John Ellerton. The names of the buried are listed in lead lettering along the edge of the kerb wall. A separate stone nearby lists the names of 35 victims who were buried elsewhere.

The memorial was paid for by the Explosives Loading Company, which also undertook to maintain it. It was unveiled and dedicated the Archbishop of Canterbury Randall Davidson on 27 September 1917. It became a Grade II listed building in 1989, and was upgraded to Grade II* in March 2016.

51.310921°N 0.90422951°E

== See also ==
- August 1916: the Low Moor Explosion at Bradford
- 19 January 1917: the Silvertown explosion at the Brunner Mond TNT plant, killed 73 people (including 18 workers, 69 immediately, 4 from injuries) and injured around 400 others
- 13 June 1917: the Ashton-under-Lyne munitions explosion at the Hooley Hill Rubber and Chemical Works killed 23 workers and 20 local residents
- 1 July 1918: an explosion at the No 6 National Shell Filling Factory, Chilwell killed 124 workers and injured 250 others
- Grade II* listed buildings in Swale
- Grade II* listed war memorials in England
