= Faversham explosives industry =

Explosives industry in Faversham, Kent, United Kingdom

Coordinates: 51°20′N 0°53′E

Faversham, in Kent, England, has claims to be the cradle of the UK's explosives industry: it was also to become one of its main centres. The first gunpowder plant in the UK was established in the 16th century, possibly at the instigation of the abbey at Faversham. With their estates and endowments, monasteries were keen to invest in promising technology.

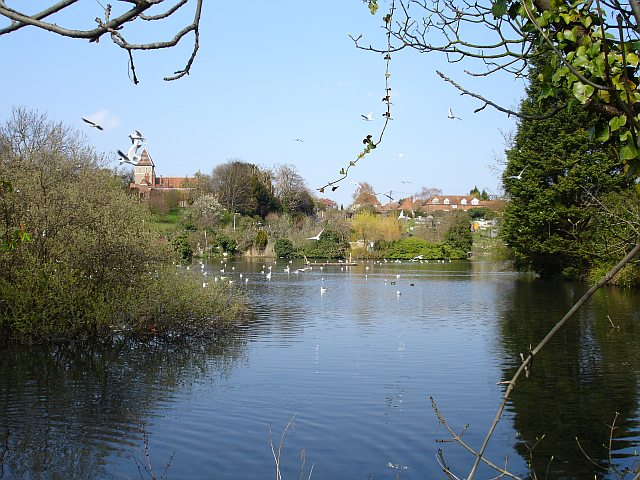
Stonebridge pond, water from which powered Faversham's gunpowder mills

Faversham was well placed. It had a stream which could be dammed at intervals to provide power for watermills. On its outskirts were low-lying areas ideal for the culture of alder and willow to provide charcoal, one of the three key gunpowder ingredients. The stream fed into a tidal creek where sulphur, another key ingredient, could be imported, and the finished product loaded for dispatch to Thames-side magazines. The port was also near the Continent where, in time of war, demand for gunpowder was brisk.

== Gunpowder ==
=== The first factories ===
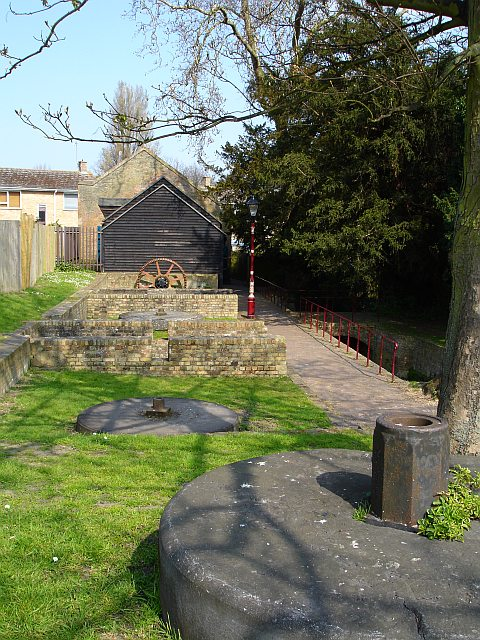
Chart gunpowder mill

The first factories were small, near the town, and alongside the stream, between the London to Dover road (now the A2) and the head of the creek. By the early 18th century, these had coalesced into a single plant, subsequently known as the Home Works, as it was the town's first.

At this time the British government was buying its supplies from the private sector, but the quality was often poor, and in 1759 it decided it needed its own plant. Rather than build a new one, it nationalised the Home Works, upgrading all the machinery. From this phase dates the Chart Gunpowder Mill, the oldest of its kind in the world (at grid reference TR009612). It was rescued from demolition, and then restored by the Faversham Society in 1966. It is now open to the public on weekend and bank holiday afternoons from April until the end of October.

Nearby is Stonebridge Pond, today a picturesque beauty spot at the head of the creek. It served to power some of the works' watermills, slender remains of which survive. It still features a network of narrow-gauge canals along which powder was punted from process to process.

=== Expansion ===
In the 1680s a second factory was started by Huguenot asylum-seekers alongside another stream about two kilometres (1.2 mi) west of the town (at grid reference TR001623). It had its own access to the sea via Oare Creek and so became known as the Oare Works, although it was wholly in the parish of Davington. It became a leading supplier to the British East India Company.

Gunpowder from Faversham was not just used in warfare. It played a key part in the Industrial Revolution, by enabling routes to be blasted for canals and railways.

The third and last gunpowder factory to open was the Marsh Works (at grid reference TR013626), built by the British government one km northwest of the town to augment output at its Home Works; it opened in 1787. It also had access to the sea via Oare Creek.

In the wake of the Napoleonic Wars, the government leased its Faversham works back to the private sector – the Home Works in 1816 and the Marsh Works in 1834 – selling them in 1825 and 1854 respectively. Explosives manufacture continued unabated at both sites under private ownership.

=== Closure ===
All three gunpowder factories shut in 1934. Imperial Chemical Industries (ICI), then the owners, believing that war might break out with Germany, and realised that Faversham would then become vulnerable to air attack or possibly invasion. They transferred production, together with key staff and machinery, to Ardeer in Ayrshire, Scotland.

=== The sites today ===
The Marsh Works became a site for mineral extraction, as it remains today, and almost all its buildings were destroyed. Except for Chart Mill, Stonebridge Pond, and a few other buildings, most of the Home Works site was redeveloped for housing in the 1960s.

The Oare Works is now a country park, open to the public free of charge all year round. Remains of process houses have been conserved. The site has a visitor centre, signed trails radiate in various directions. An early 20th-century electric-powered gunpowder mill, which was transferred to Ardeer in 1934, has been repatriated and is on display. The 18th-century works bell has also been re-deployed and is on display at Faversham's Fleur de Lis Heritage Centre.

Oare Gunpowder Works Country Park
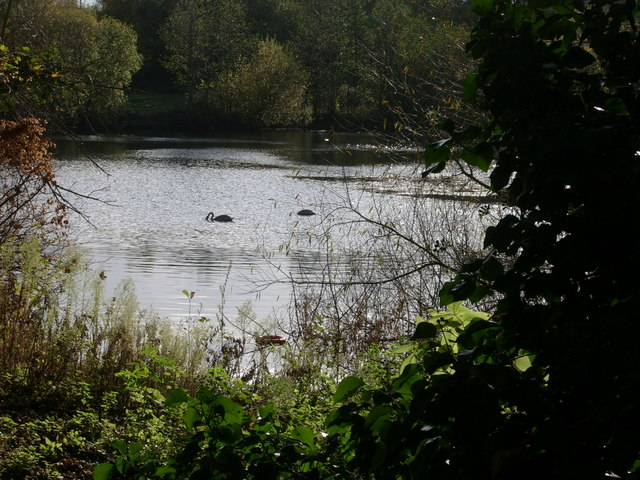
Upper mill pond

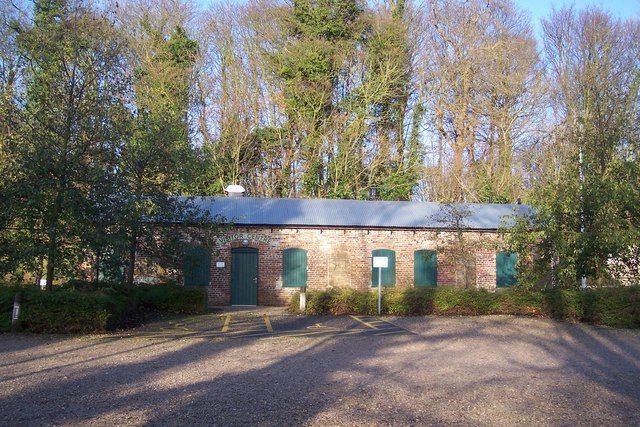
Former cooperage, now the site's visitor centre

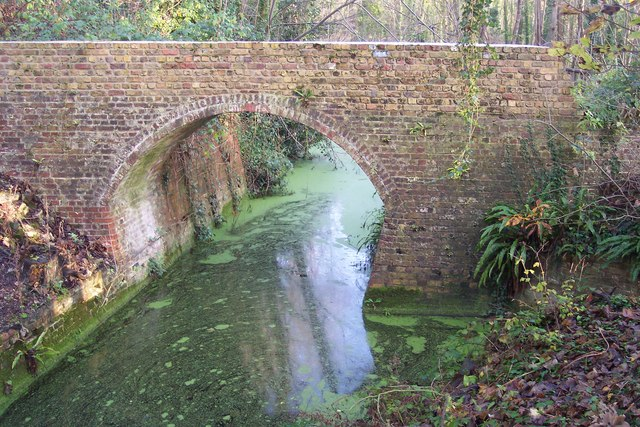
Canal alongside the glazing mill

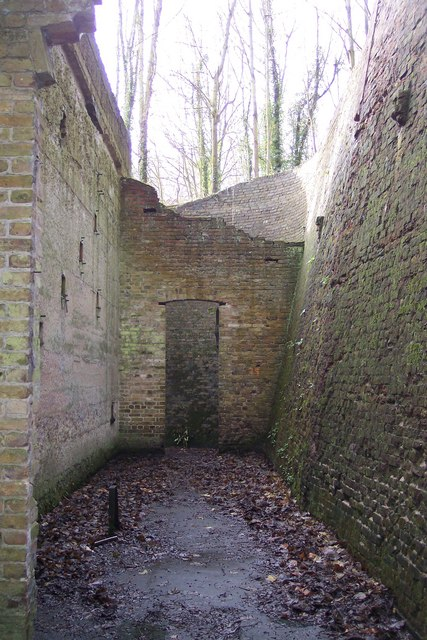
Remains of the corning house

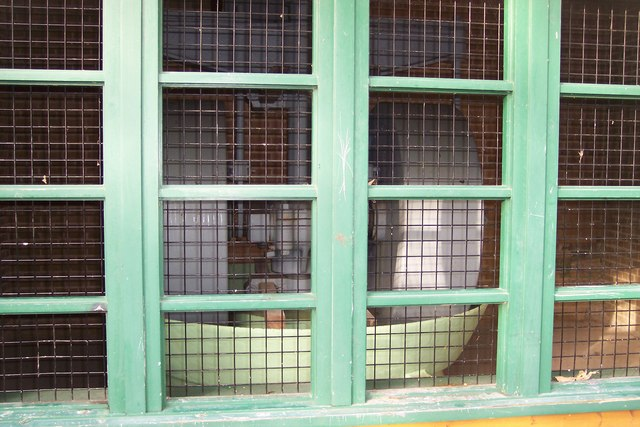
The restored electric milling machinery

== Guncotton ==
Gunpowder is a low explosive, best used as a propellant. Guncotton, the first high explosive, more useful for its destructive powers, was invented by Dr Christian Schonbein, of the University of Basel, in 1846. Under licence from him, it was first manufactured at Faversham's Marsh Works in 1847.

=== 1847 explosion ===
The manufacturing process was not yet fully understood. On 14 July 1847 a serious explosion killed 18 staff, only 10 of whose bodies could be identified. As a result of the blast, the factory owners shut the plant.

=== New factory ===
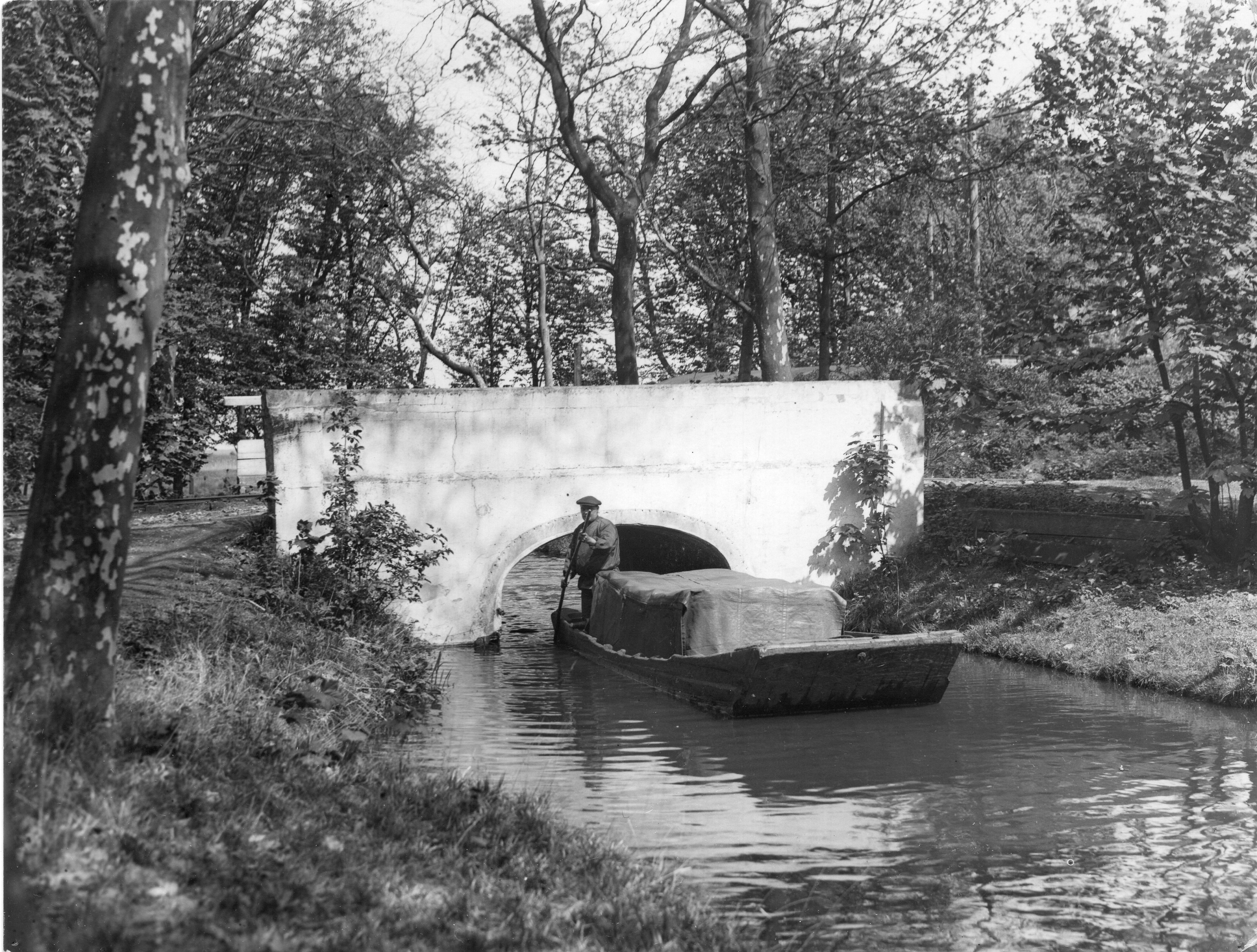
Oare Gunpowder Worker on a punt approximately 1900

Guncotton was not made again in Faversham until 1873, when the Cotton Powder Company, independent of the gunpowder factories, opened a new plant on a remote site near Uplees, about four km northwest of the town centre. It was still within the parish, but alongside the River Swale, the deep-water channel that divides mainland Kent from the Isle of Sheppey. Deliveries of raw materials — cotton waste and sulphuric and nitric acids — could readily be made, and the product was easily dispatched by water.

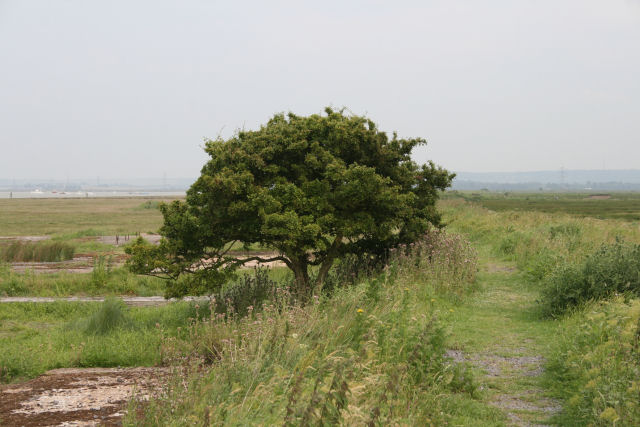
The remote site of the Uplees factory (now a nature reserve)

With a buoyant market, the factory rapidly expanded, producing each new high explosive as it was formulated. Adjoining it to the west in 1913 an associated venture, the Explosives Loading Company, built a plant to fill bombs and shells. Both plants were high-tech state-of-the-art, with a power station, hydraulic mains and an internal telephone and tramway systems. Together they occupied an area of 500 acres (two km^{2}) — almost as large as that of the City of London.

=== World War I ===
When the First World War started in 1914, the two factories were requisitioned by the Admiralty and armed guards were mounted. Production facilities were further expanded and many new staff recruited from Faversham and elsewhere in East Kent. Road access for the workers was poor, so the Admiralty built a metre-gauge railway, the Davington Light Railway, to transport them from a terminus at Davington, near the Home Works, to Uplees.

The owners of both Swale-side factories had foreseen that they would become superfluous at the end of the First World War, and they closed promptly and permanently in 1919. The Davington light railway track was lifted; its three steam locomotives found new homes in South America, where at least one is thought to survive.

=== The Great Explosion ===
The 1916 explosion at Faversham was the worst in the history of the British explosives industry. At 14:20 on Sunday 2 April 1916, a huge explosion ripped through the gunpowder mill at Uplees, near Faversham, when a store of 200 tons of trinitrotoluene (TNT) was detonated following some empty sacks catching fire. The TNT and ammonium nitrate (used to manufacture amatol) had exploded. The weather might have contributed to the start of the fire. The previous month had been wet but had ended with a short dry spell so that by that weekend the weather was "glorious", providing perfect conditions for heat-generated combustion.

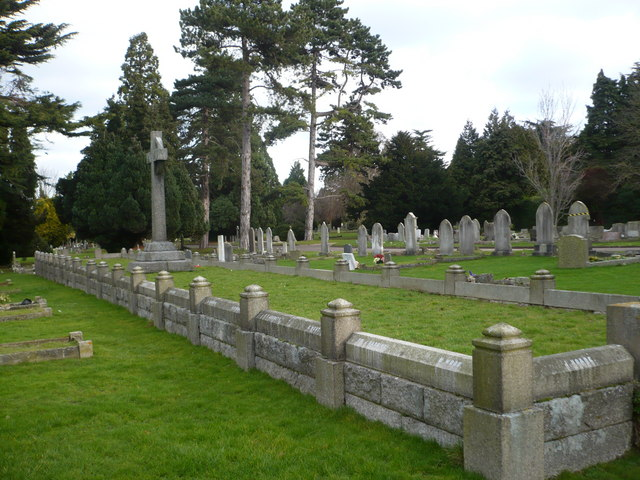
The Grade II* listed Faversham Munitions Explosion Memorial in Faversham Cemetery was unveiled by the Archbishop of Canterbury Randall Davidson in 1917

As it was a Sunday, no women were at work. There were 115 deaths of men and boys, including all the Works Fire Brigade, in the explosion and in subsequent sympathetic detonations. The bodies of seven victims were never found; 108 corpses were buried in a mass grave at Faversham Cemetery on 6 April.

The munitions factory was in a remote spot in the middle of the open marshes of North Kent, next to the Thames coastline, hence the explosion was heard across the Thames estuary and as far away as Norwich and Great Yarmouth. In Southend-on-Sea domestic windows and two large plate-glass shop windows were broken.

The East Kent Gazette published in Sittingbourne, did not report the explosion until 29 April. Although recognising the need for some censorship, it referred to the reply given in Parliament to an appropriate question as "mystifying and ambiguous" and called for the fullest precautions to be implemented to "prevent another calamity of the kind" occurring again.

Although not the first such disaster at Faversham's historic munitions works, the April 1916 blast is recorded as "the worst ever in the history of the UK explosives industry", and yet the full picture is still somewhat confused. The reason for the fire is uncertain. And considering the quantity of explosive chemicals stored at the works – with one report indicating that a further 3,000 tons remained in nearby sheds unaffected – it is remarkable, and a tribute to those who struggled against the fire, that so much of the nation's munitions were prevented from contributing further to the catastrophe.

The Secretary of State for War, Earl Kitchener, had written to the management of the CPC in 1914, and it is presumed the ELC, informing the workforce on: "the importance of the government work upon which they [were] engaged ... I should like all engaged by your company to know that it is fully recognised that they, in carrying out the great work of supplying munitions of war, are doing their duty for their King and Country, equally with those who have joined the Army for active service in the field".

== The Abbey works ==
This, however, was not quite the end of high explosives manufacture in Faversham. In 1924 a new venture, the Mining Explosives Company, opened a factory on the east side of Faversham Creek, not far from the site of Faversham Abbey, hence its 'Abbey Works' name. Typical of explosive and munitions factories (see for example the National Filling Factories of WW1) this had rows of well separated lightweight wooden huts, with trolleyways between the huts with trolleys pushed by hand between the buildings. There were also 3 solidly built explosives magazines for storage. The site was adjacent to both water and rail transport (the now closed Faversham Creek branch had a link to the former brickfields - though it is not clear what means of transporting the products was originally used). Although reduced in size over the years it remains in much the same arrangement as when originally built and is recorded in Kent County Council's "Kent Historic Environment Record (formerly the Sites and Monuments Record)" which has provided most of the details below.

Its "Mexco" (short for Mining Explosives Company) telegraphic address led to it being known as The Mexico by local people. The Nitroglycerin blasting cartridges produced by the factory were marketed under the names "Klorex" and "Perklorex", and then in 1931 the company changed its name to Heaters Ltd after changing over to production of the far safer Cardox blasting system, which was patented in 1931 by David Hodge and Cardox (Great Britain) Ltd. This used a large reusable steel cartridge containing a detonator and a heating chemical (energiser), and the rest of the space is filled with liquid carbon dioxide. When the energiser is activated it causes a rapid heatup of the liquid carbon dioxide which becomes a supercritical fluid. The pressure continues to rise until the point where it ruptures the bursting disk causing an energetic physical explosion (as opposed to a combustion explosion). This is a far safer system than the nitroglycerin that preceded it. It was authorised for use in British mines in 1932, and it is still used today. The premises still needed to be licensed under the 1875 Explosives Act, as explosives were used in the detonator. The energiser, known as Heatox B, was involved in the only fatal explosion on the site, on 25 March 1939 when the manager Mr J Lapraik and Messrs E Harris and A Boorman were killed. This resulted in a change to a new energiser, Heatox D, in 1940.

In its heyday there were 70 to 80 employees, and between 1940 and 1970 a total of 60 million blasting cartridges were made and sold, an average of around 200,000 per month. Modern machinery has reduced the need for blasting, especially in coal mines, and by 1977 the workforce had reduced to just 4 people, but the Cardox system has other uses, such as in demolition. The original company, Heaters Ltd, closed the works in 1966, however in the following year the works was bought by Pikrose and Company (formerly called Cardox (Great Britain) Ltd - the patent holders for Cardox) and the manufacture of the Cardox blasting cartridges was resumed. In 1991 Pikrose merged with Long Airdox (Cardox Ltd) which became part of the Marmon Group. In 2001 Long Airdox was sold to Deutsche Bergbau-Technik (DBT) which is owned by RAG Coal International AG, based in Essen, Germany. In spite of the changes of ownership, production continues still using the original buildings on a site that has seen remarkable little change.

== See also ==
- Ballincollig Royal Gunpowder Mills
- Gunpowder Magazines in England
- Eleutherian Mills
- Waltham Abbey Royal Gunpowder Mills
- Silvertown explosion
- List of the largest artificial non-nuclear explosions
