= Stalisfield =

Village in Kent, England

Coordinates: 51.24°N 0.81°E

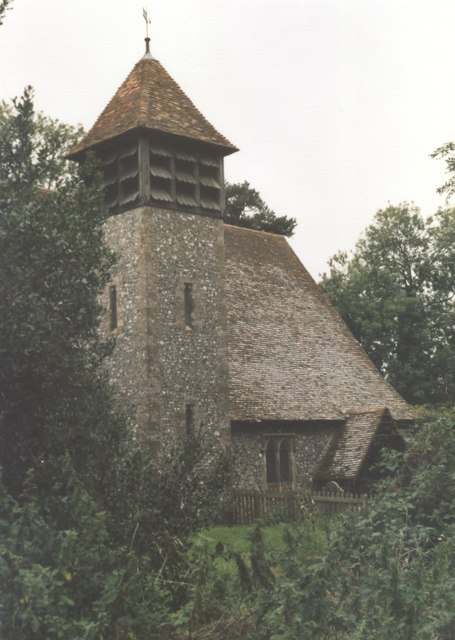
- Church of St Mary, Stalisfield

- Location within Kent
- Population: 205 (2011 Census)
- Civil parish: Stalisfield
- District: Swale
- Shire county: Kent
- Region: South East
- Country: England
- Sovereign state: United Kingdom
- Post town: Faversham
- Postcode district: ME13
- Dialling code: 01795
- Police: Kent
- Fire: Kent
- Ambulance: South East Coast
- UK Parliament: Faversham and Mid Kent

Stalisfield is a village in the borough of Swale in Kent, England, located on a secondary road about 1½ miles (2.4 km) north of Charing and 5 miles south west of Faversham. The parish includes the hamlet of Stalisfield Green.

Stalisfield Green lies high on the North Downs (a designated Area of Outstanding Natural Beauty), some 650 feet above sea level, and close to the escarpment above Charing.

== History ==
It was once anciently called 'Starchfield'. It is called in the Domesday survey 'Stanefelle', which means Stonefield. At the time of the Domesday survey the village belonged to Odo, Earl of Kent, (as the Bishop of Bayeux). After Odo's trial for fraud the village was passed to Adam de Port. Then it passed (along with Oare) to Arnulf Kade, who gave it to the Knights Hospitallers.

In 1545 it passed to Sir Anthony St. Leger. It was then sold in 1551 to Sir Anthony Aucher (the father of Anthony Aucher). In 1567 it was sold to Sir Nicholas Salter. In 1699 it was sold to Mr Richard Webbe, of Eleham. In 1711 it passed to dame Sarah Barrett, widow of Sir Paul Barrett,(serjeant-at-law). Sarah was married to Sir Richard Head, 1st Baronet's son Francis Head. Her grandson, Sir Francis Head, then inherited the manor. His brother, Sir John Head, inherited after his death in 1768. Sir John died in 1769, and his widow Lady Jane Head took control. In 1780 she died and it passed to William Lynch (her great-grandson). It then carried on in his family.

Also in the parish is Darbies Court. In 1445 John Darbie, who was alderman of London, and sheriff, was the owner. In 1399 Sir Ralph St. Leger, of Otterden (Sir Anthony St. Leger), became the owner. In 1798 the Right Hon. Lewis Thomas Watson, 2nd Baron Sondes, was the owner. The house still exists as Derbies Court, a Grade II listed building.

The church of Ore was anciently recorded as the chapel to the parish, but it has been long since separated, and has become a distinct church independent of it.

In the 13th century the church of St Mary was built, in the diocese of Canterbury, and deanery of Ospringe. It is Grade II* listed.

== Present day ==
The village is notable for its public house, the Plough Inn. Built between 1350 and 1450, it is a fine example of a Wealden hall house and is Grade II listed. The pub serves only Kentish beers and ciders from traditional hand pumps; it regularly featuring ales from Hopdaemon (from Syndale Vineyard Newnham), Gadds (Ramsgate) and Goachers (Maidstone). In 2009, it was awarded 'Kent's best pub' by 'Produced in Kent' and in 2018 was a finalist in the national Freehold Pub of the Year. It is the only true local pub in Kent with 2 AA rosettes for excellence in food.

In October 2014 a new village hall was opened adjacent to the village green, replacing the old wooden First World War officers’ mess hut, which was relocated to the village from Throwley Airfield after the end of the war.

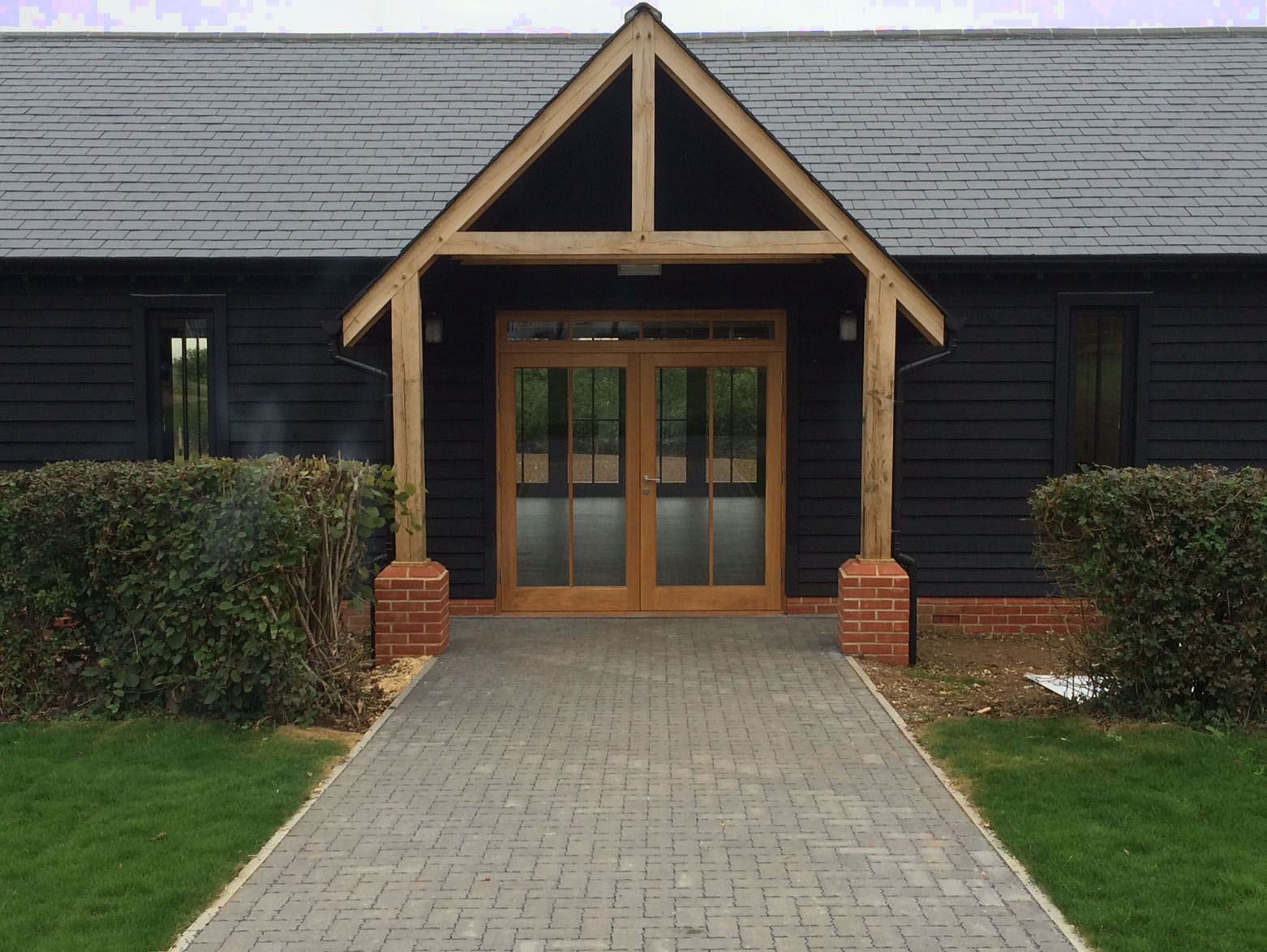
The village hall in Stalisfield Green, built in 2014

== See also ==
- Listed buildings in Stalisfield
