= Manning Wardle =

Defunct British locomotive manufacturer

Manning Wardle was a steam locomotive manufacturer based in Hunslet, Leeds, West Yorkshire, England.

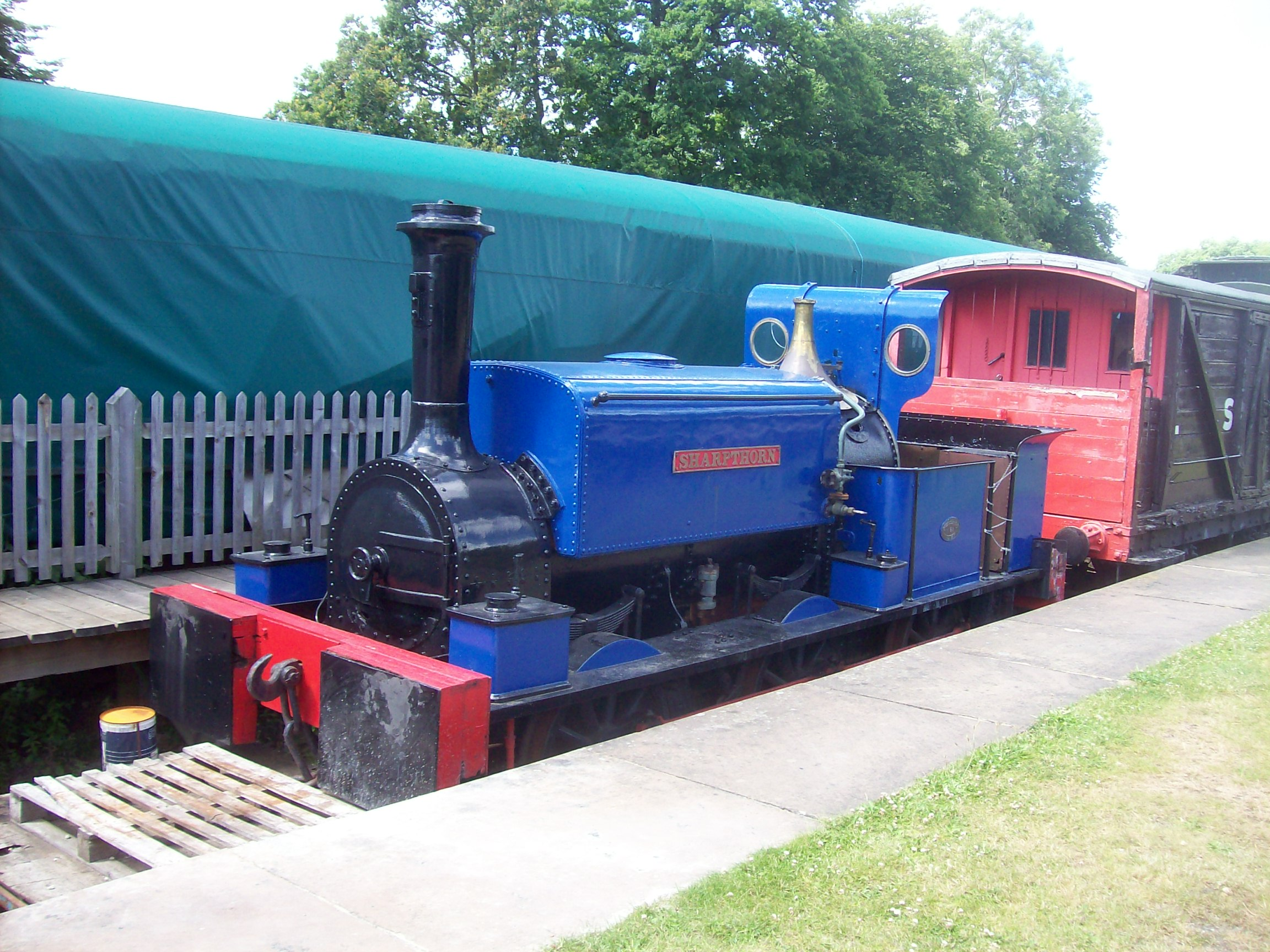
1877 Manning Wardle 0-6-0ST Sharpthorn at Horsted Keynes on the Bluebell Railway

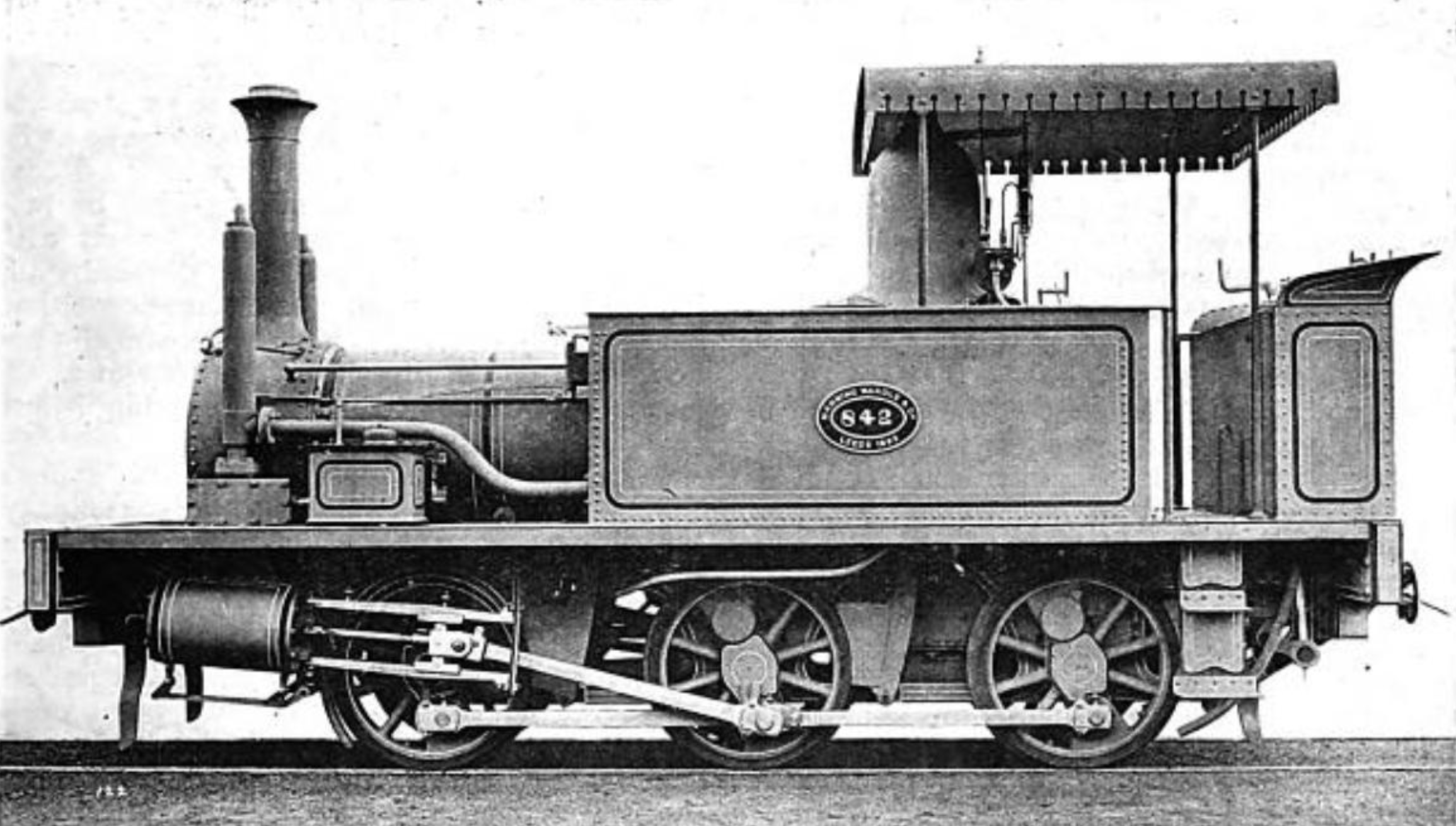
Manning Wardle 842, built in 1883 for the Malta Railway

== Precursor companies ==
The city of Leeds was one of the earliest centres of locomotive building; Matthew Murray built the first commercially successful steam locomotive, Salamanca, in Holbeck, Leeds, in 1812. By 1856, a number of manufacturers had sprung up in the city, including Kitson and Company, and E. B. Wilson and Company, doing business as the Railway Foundry after 1848.

== Manning Wardle ==
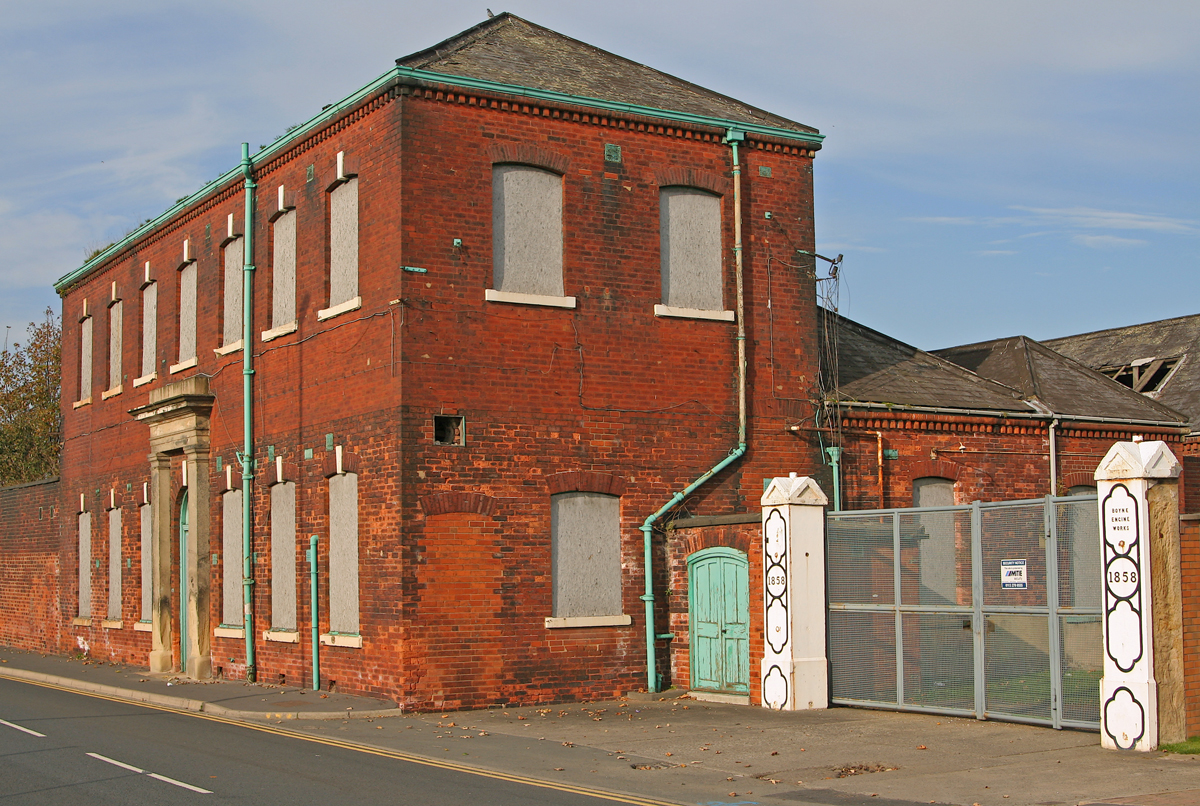
Manning Wardle's Boyne Engine Works in Leeds

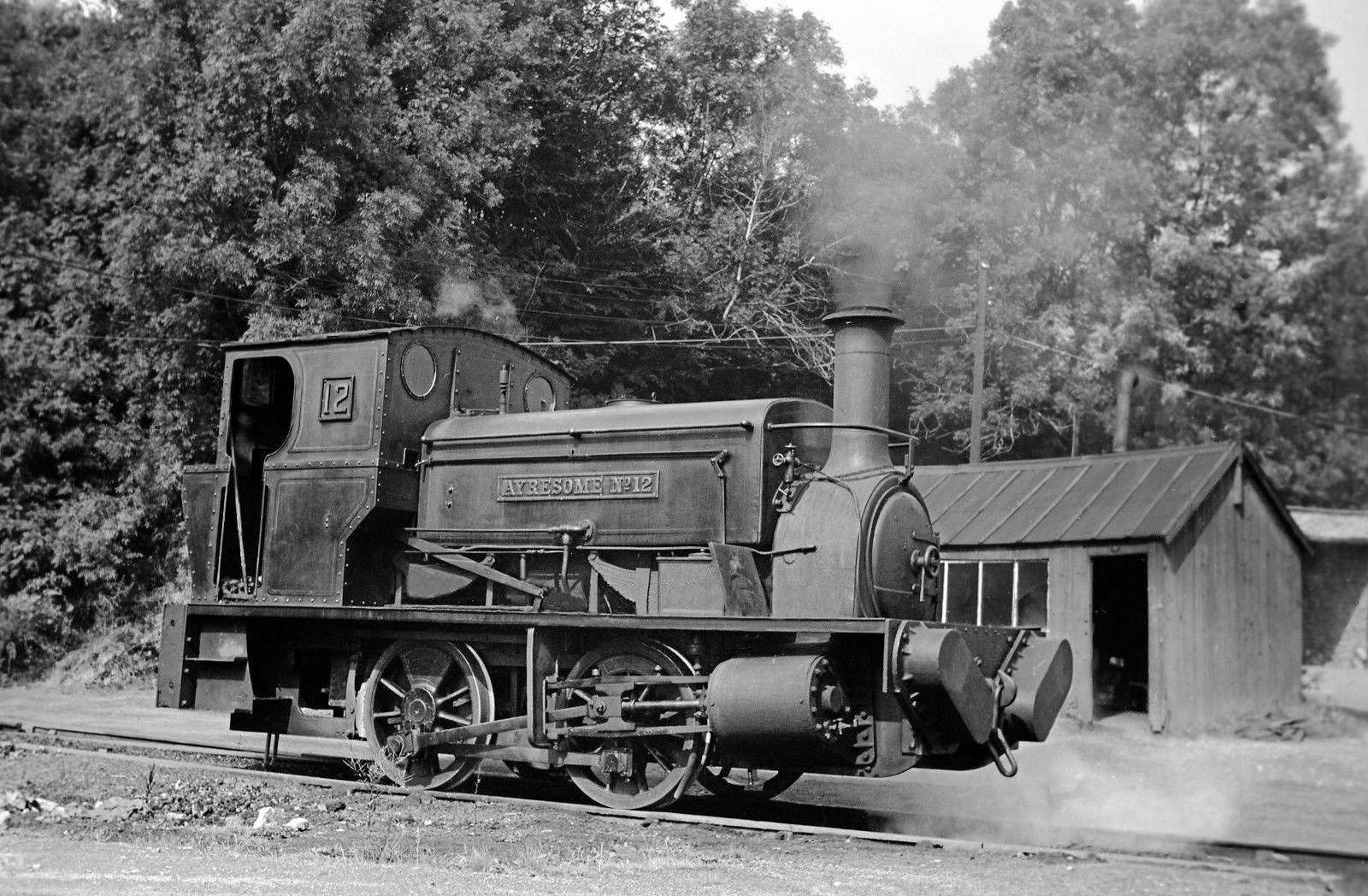
Ayresome No 12 by Manning Wardle & Co. Ltd

The Railway Foundry (E.B Wilson from 1838 to 1848) operated in Leeds until 1858. At least some of the company's designs and some materials were purchased by Manning Wardle & Company, who located their Boyne Engine Works in Jack Lane in the Hunslet district of the city. Steam locomotive construction commenced on the site in 1859. Within the next few years, two other companies, the Hunslet Engine Company and Hudswell, Clarke & Company also opened premises in Jack Lane. There was a good deal of staff movement between the three firms, leading to similar designs leaving all three works. Whilst Hudswell Clarke and Hunslet Engine Company built a wide variety of locomotive types, Manning Wardle concentrated on specialised locomotives for contractor's use, building up a range of locomotives suitable for all types of contracting work.

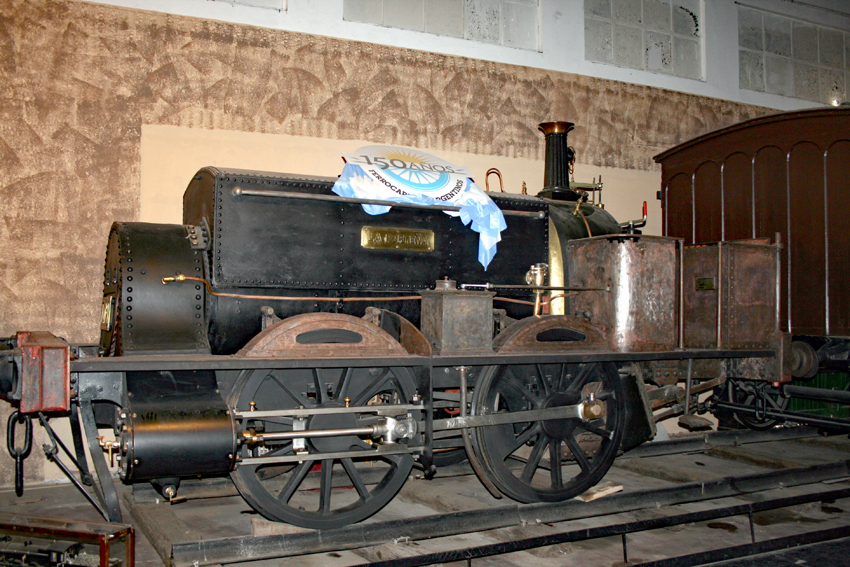
No 1 La Porteña, first steam loco in Argentina

The pivotal Manning Wardle inside-cylinder design was an 0-4-0ST with 9-by-14-inch (230 by 360 mm) cylinders, one of which might have been owned by David Joy (it is described as being for sale in Leeds in 1856 in Vol. 3 of his Diaries) and which was later owned by the Midland Railway. An 0-4-2ST with 9.25-by-14-inch (235 by 356 mm) cylinders was developed from this design for the Oxford, Worcester and Wolverhampton Railway in 1853. In 1855 a 0-6-0ST with 11-by-17-inch (280 by 430 mm) class was developed, mainly for colliery work. Two of these, named Alliance and Victory were used in the Crimea; a contemporary descriptions of them in the Leeds press clearly show that the 'Railway Foundry 14-inch (360 mm) 0-6-0ST was the direct forerunner of the Manning Wardle 'Old Class I'. The origin of the outside cylinder 0-4-0ST standard designs is more obscure. The Chronicles of Boulton's Siding mentions a Railway Foundry 11-inch (280 mm) outside cylinder 0-4-0ST, but this work is notoriously unreliable. An 1856-vintage 5 ft 6 in (1,676 mm) gauge outside cylinder 2-2-0ST with all wheels of the same diameter, La Porteña survives in Luján, Argentina (Manning Wardle later built a coupled version of this), but the most credible evidence for the first outside cylinder 0-4-0ST design is the 3 ft (914 mm) gauge 8-inch (203 mm) 0-4-0ST alluded to in the 1862 London Exhibition Catalogue as being similar to the maker's 'D' and 'E' classes apart from the gauge.

Manning Wardle went on to play an important part in narrow gauge steam locomotive evolution. After neighbours Hunslet Engine Co. had pioneered the 'Leeds Mainstream' pattern of narrow-gauge steam locomotive (full length outside mainframes; outside cylinders; proper locomotive-pattern boiler; direct drive to coupled wheels; foundation ring below top of frame level, and firebox width not constrained by wheelset 'back-to-back' dimension) with its Dinorwic in 1870, in 1871 Manning Wardle made series production of the type a serious proposition commencing with 18 in (457 mm) gauge 0-4-0ST Lord Raglan (No. 353) for the Royal Arsenal. Similar locomotives followed for both the Arsenal and Chatham Dockyard and in 1872 Manning Wardle's first long-wheelbase 0-6-0 to John Barraclough Fell's patents, an 18 in (457 mm) gauge 0-6-0 tender locomotive for the Royal Engineers on the 'Leeds mainstream' Model appeared. This was followed by two 2 ft 6 in (762 mm) gauge Fell-pattern 0-6-0ST's in 1873 for the Bay of Havana Railway (see below), one (later two) 0-6-0's for the Pentewan Railway in Cornwall, and several 'Quasi-Fell' six-coupled locomotives for Sweden, India and Mexico (again see below). After the appearance of Hunslet's 0-6-4ST Beddgelert in 1877, the 'Leeds Mainstream' specification had truly come of age and the Boyne Engine Works went on to produce its own more sophisticated designs in the same vein, including the well-known 2-6-2T's for the Lynton & Barnstaple, 2 ft 6 in (762 mm) gauge 0-6-2's for India, and a pair of 2-6-4T's for South Africa. Further examples, including two 0-6-2STs, were to emanate from Boyne Engine Works almost up to the company's demise, but most of the later-built examples were for overseas customers in Chile, India and Argentina, the last-mentioned example (No. 2039 of 1924) being an 18-inch gauge development of No. 353 of 1871.

Manning Wardle became a limited company in 1905.

Many Manning Wardle locomotives – of 4 ft 8 1/2 in (1,435 mm) standard gauge and various narrow gauges – were exported to Europe, Africa, the Middle East (e.g. the Palestine Railways Class M), the Indian sub-continent, Australasia (e.g. NZR WH class) and South America.

During the First World War, Manning Wardle produced a petrol engined standard gauge shunter for the War Office. This had a 180 hp Thornycroft 6-cylinder marine type reversing engine, and had coupled 0-4-0 layout, weighing 27 long tons (30.2 short tons; 27.4 t). Ten of these were ordered initially, with armour-plated superstructures for heavy haulage of rail-mounted guns. The first was delivered to the Longmoor Military Railway in October 1915, the last to France in May 1916. They proved 'wholly' unsuccessful and were soon relegated to shunting work.

== Decline and closure ==
The company employed traditional construction throughout its existence and failed to take advantage of the more efficient mass production techniques becoming available. The Wardle family connection with the company ceased in 1919 and the company was latterly owned largely by railway contractors (historically an important customer base). The loss of Russian orders following the 1917 October Revolution and the imposition of a punitive Excess Profits Tax in 1921 played their part in bringing about the company's eventual demise, as did expenditure on a new Boiler Shop in 1924 in an attempt to modernise production methods. In what had become a bleak environment for private locomotive builders generally Manning Wardle had simply become uncompetitive.

The last complete locomotive was No. 2047, a standard gauge 0-6-0ST delivered to Rugby Cement Works in August 1926. This locomotive was preserved at the Severn Valley Railway and last steamed in 1977 when the boiler was condemned. After some years on static display at Kidderminster Railway Museum, restoration began in 2010 and as of 2021 is in progress at Bewdley. The design for a new boiler has been approved.

== Acquisition ==
Following closure in 1926 after producing more than 2,000 steam locomotives, much of the site was taken over by Hunslet Engine Co., with some parts going to the diesel engine manufacturer, McClaren. The company's intellectual property rights, goodwill, drawings and patterns initially passed Kitson & Co., thence to Robert Stephenson & Hawthorn in 1938 and finally to Hunslet Engine Company in 1960. Kitson & Co. made twenty-three locos of Manning Wardle design until the firm's withdrawal from locomotive manufacture and Robert Stephenson & Hawthorn produced a further five in 1940–41, all T class 0-6-0ST's for Stewarts & Lloyds. The surviving drawings are now held at Statfold Barn Railway Museum, near Tamworth.

The trademark name Manning Wardle is owned by a company formed in 1999 to preserve the name for the Lynton & Barnstaple Railway, which from 1898 to 1935 operated what have become some of the company's most famous products, narrow gauge 2-6-2T engines: Exe, Taw, Yeo and later Lew.

== Preservation ==
Many locomotives of the company have been preserved, as listed below

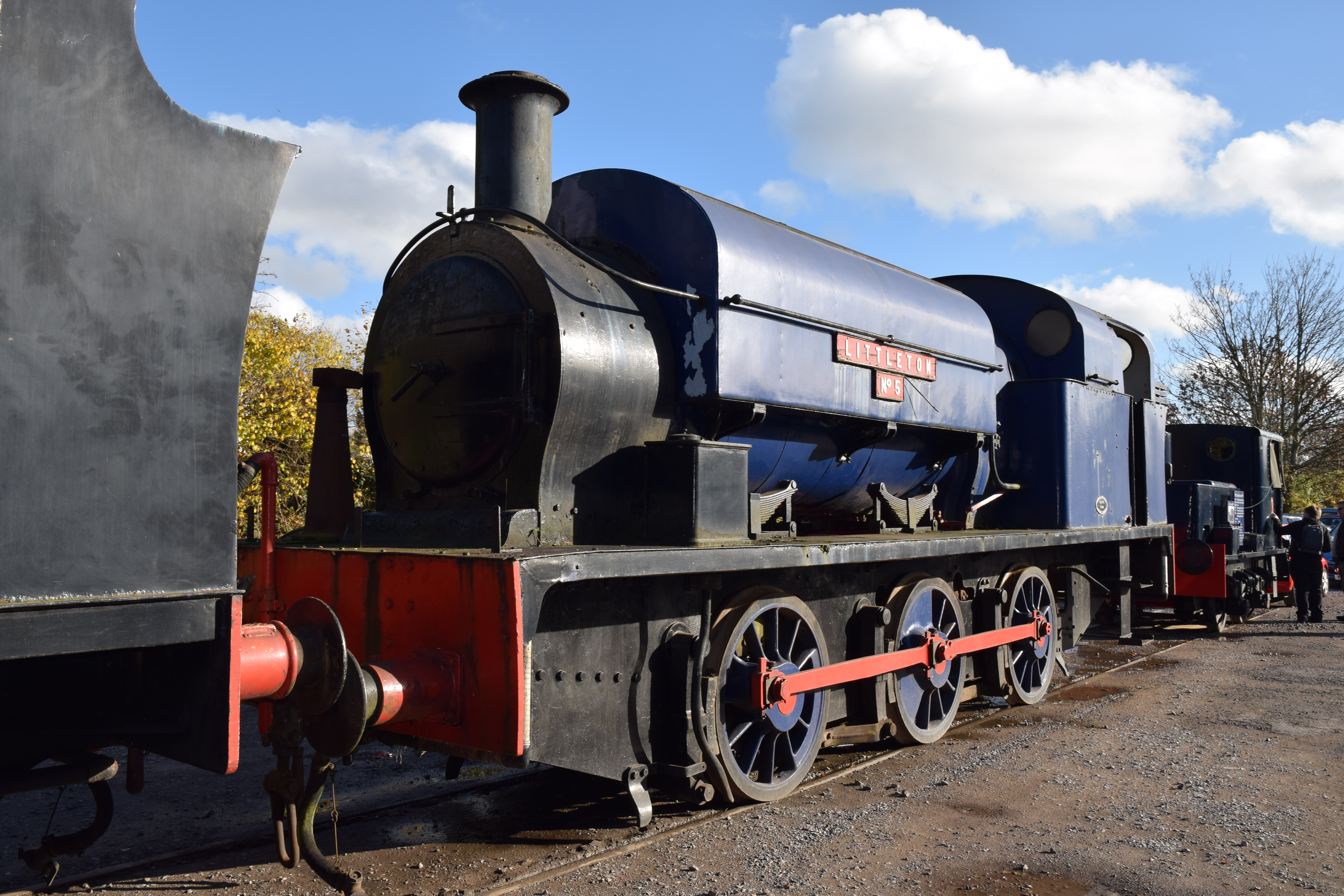
Manning Wardle No. 2018 on the Avon Valley Railway

=== Steam ===
- No. 375 of 1871: Ituana Railway, Brazil, Caramaru originally 3 ft 1.6in gauge, now 1,000 mm (3 ft 3 3/8 in). On display outside Industrial and Commercial Secretariat, Imbituba, Brazil. 0-4-0ST Special. May contain components from No. 2016 of 1921.
- No. 441 of 1873: Originally named Coliseo Bay of Havana & Matanzas Railway, now on display in incomplete form at the railway museum in Havana. 0-6-0ST Special, Fell pattern.
- No. 576 of 1875: Norsk Hoved-Jernbane No. 25 (NHJ Class D/NSB Class 7), on display at the Norwegian Railway Museum in Hamar, Norway. 0-4-0ST Modified F class.
- No. 641 of 1877: Sharpthorn – Preserved and on display at the Bluebell Railway, in Southeast England. 0-6-0ST K class.
- No. 815 of 1881: Preserved and on static display at the Railway Museum, Saitama city, Saitama Pref. Japan. 0-6-0ST Special.
- No. 865 of 1882: Aldwyth – Preserved and on static display at the Leeds Industrial Museum, in Armley, West Yorkshire, Northern England. 0-6-0ST K class.
- No. 1045 of 1888: North Eastern Railway of Uruguay No. 1, now at Penarol Diesel Works, Montevideo, Uruguay. Special descended from old class I.
- No. 1126 of 1889: 3 ft 6 in (1,067 mm) gauge FCCT No. 1, now displayed at Plazoleta Sotomajor, Tocopilla, Chile. 0-4-0ST Special.
- No. 1156 or 1157 of 1889: Palmerjero Mining Co., Chihuahua, Mexico, 3 ft (914 mm) gauge, originally 0-6-0T 'Quasi Fell' pattern, later 2-4-0T (conversion used maker's components). Now displayed in the Plaza, Chinipaz, Mexico.
- No. 1159 of 1889: Jack Tar originally 3 ft (914 mm) gauge, converted to 3 ft 6 in (1,067 mm) gauge by Hunslet Engine Co. and later exported to Mashonaland Railway, S. Rhodesia. Preserved in Bulawayo Railway Museum, Zimbabwe. 0-6-0ST 'Long Boiler' Special.
- No. 1198 of 1887: Port Administration No. 3. Now at CEFU, Montevideo, Uruguay. 0-6-0ST Special descended from old class I.
- No. 1207 of 1890: The Welshman. Now on Foxfield Railway. 0-6-0ST 'Long Boiler' Special.
- No. 1210 of 1891: Logan and Hemingway No. 30 Sir Berkeley – Preserved and undergoing overhaul on the Middleton Railway, in West Yorkshire, Northern England. 0-6-0ST L class.
- No. 1248 of 1892: Norsk Hoved-Jernbane No. 11 (NHJ Class D/NSB Class 7), running at the Krøderen Line in Buskerud, Norway. 0-4-0ST Modified F class.
- No. 1317 of 1895: Birmingham Corporation Rhiwnant. under restoration at South Coast Steam Ltd., Portland Dorset. 0-6-0ST Special.
- No. 1351 of 1897 A.G. Puertos No. 8 5 ft 6 in (1,676 mm) gauge, now preserved at Museo Ferroportuario, Commodoro Rivadavia, Argentina. 0-6-0T Special.
- No. 1382 of 1897: Cilgwin Slate Co. Ltd, Jubilee 1897, 2 ft (610 mm) gauge. Now with Vale of Rheidol Railway, Wales. 0-4-0ST Special.
- No. 1532 of 1901: Midland Coal, Iron and Coke Co. Newcastle – Preserved and currently stored at the Beamish Museum, in Northeast England. 0-6-0ST Modified M class.
- No. 1583 of 1902: SAR No. 20 Midget, 2 ft (610 mm) gauge. Now at Gold Reef City, Johannesburg, South Africa. 0-4-0T Special.
- No. 1601 of 1903: John Aird & Co. No. 138 Matthew Murray – Preserved and awaiting overhaul on the Middleton Railway, in West Yorkshire, Northern England. 0-6-0ST L class.
- No. 1609 of 1903: Palmerjero Mining Co., Chihuahua, Mexico, 3 ft (914 mm) gauge. Now displayed in the Plaza, Chinipaz, Mexico. 2-4-2T special.
- No. 1656 of 1905: CF du Katanga 3 ft 6 in (1,067 mm) gauge. Maramba No. 1. Now displayed Lubumbashi Station DR of Congo. 0-6-0ST Special.
- No. 1675 of 1906: 3 ft (914 mm) gauge Kettering Furnaces No. 8 (updated version of Jack Tar as built). Under restoration in Leics. 0-6-0ST 'Long Boiler' Special.
- No. 1762 of 1910: Lloyds Ironstone Co. Ltd. No. 14 Dolobran – Preserved and undergoing restoration on the Great Central Railway (Nottingham). 0-6-0ST T class
- No. 1781 of 1911: New South Wales Government Public Works Department. Static display at the Powerhouse Museum, Sydney Australia. 0-4-0ST H class.
- No. 1795 of 1912: T. W. Ward Ltd. E.B.Wilson – Preserved and currently awaiting restoration at Derwent Valley Light Railway, in Yorkshire. 0-4-0ST Special.
- No. 1802 of 1912: Possum. New to Vickers Shipbuilding, Barrow, purchased 1919 by Hoskins Ironworks, Lithgow N.S.W. later to A.I.S. Port Kembla 1928, withdrawn 1967. On display at Eskbank House, Lithgow, N.S.W. Australia. 0-4-0ST Special.
- No. 1822 of 1913: Originally for Buenos Aires Harbour Works, Argentina, latterly Sierra Menera no. 27 (Spain). Now in San Fernando, Andalusia, Spain, 5 ft 6 in (1,676 mm) gauge. 0-6-0ST Modified M class with original correct smokebox profile. Frame spacing as for British standard gauge but with reverse mounted hornblocks to cope with longer axles for the wider gauge.
- No. 1848 of 1914: Originally for Buenos Aires Harbour Works, Argentina, now at LLEIDA ARMF workshops, Spain for restoration, 5 ft 6 in (1,676 mm) gauge. 0-6-0ST Modified M class with original correct smokebox profile. Frame spacing as for British standard gauge but with reverse mounted hornblocks to cope with longer axles for the wider gauge.
- No. 1864 of 1915: SLGR Nellie, 2 ft 6 in (762 mm) gauge, now in Freetown Railway Museum, Sierra Leone. 0-4-0ST Special.
- No. 1877 of 1915: Chattenden and Upnor Railway Chevallier 2 ft 6 in (762 mm) gauge. Now at Flour Mill Workshops, Forest of Dean. 0-6-2T Special based on design for Chilean Nitrate Railways.
- No. 1896 of 1916: New South Wales Government Railway No. 1021 Cardiff. On Display at Trainworks Thirlmere, N.S.W. Australia. 0-4-0ST H class.
- No. 1901 of 1916: 2 ft 6 in (762 mm) gauge Don Carlos, now derelict at Carlos Casado SA, Puerto Casado, Paraguay. 2-8-2WT Special (pony trucks believed missing).
- No. 1915 of 1916: 1,000 mm (3 ft 3 3/8 in) gauge, Davington Light Railway, Kent to Imbituba Docks Brazil (No. 2 on both systems). Now in Tubarao Railway Museum, Santa Catarina, Brazil. 0-6-0ST Special.
- No. 1916 of 1916: 1,000 mm (3 ft 3 3/8 in) gauge, Davington Light Railway, Kent to Imbituba Docks Brazil (No. 3 on both systems). Now in Diamond Park, Capivari, Santa Catarina, Brazil. 0-6-0ST Special.
- No. 1955 of 1917: Park Gate Iron and Steel Company No. 14 Charwelton – Preserved and undergoing overhaul on the Kent & East Sussex Railway, in South East England. 0-6-0ST Special, modified from O class.
- No. 2009 of 1921: Lloyds Ironstone Co. Ltd. No. 41 Rhyl – Preserved and undergoing restoration on the Great Central Railway (Nottingham). 0-6-0ST T class.
- No. 2010 of 1921: Lloyds Ironstone Co. Ltd. No. 42 Rhondda – On static display at Caister Castle, Norfolk. 0-6-0ST T class.
- No. 2015 of 1921: Cardiff Corporation Waterworks No. 5 Abernant – Preserved and under restoration in private workshop near Killamarsh, Yorkshire. 0-6-0ST de facto M class but with incorrect straight-sided smokebox profile.
- No. 2018 of 1922: Littleton Colliery Littleton No. 5 – Preserved and currently out of use, at the Avon Valley Railway, in Gloucestershire. 0-6-0ST Special.
- No. 2025 of 1923: Cadbury Bros. No. 7 Winston Churchill. 0-6-0ST de facto L class.
- No. 2047 of 1926: Rugby Portland Cement No. 4 Warwickshire It was the last locomotive built by Manning Wardle and is preserved and undergoing overhaul on the Severn Valley Railway. 0-6-0ST Special modified from Q class.
- New-build completed at Boston Lodge (F.R.) 2010 2 ft (610 mm) gauge Lyd based on Lynton & Barnstaple locomotives. 2-6-2T Special.

=== Diesel and electric ===
- TBA

=== Models ===
Ready to run models:

- In 2018 Minerva Model Railways produced the K Class 0-6-0ST in O gauge.
- In 2024 Rapido Trains UK announced the productions of the L Class 0-6-0ST in OO gauge.

Kits

- CSP Models brass kits Littleton No 4/5 0-6-0ST in OO/EM/P4 gauge.
- CSP Models brass kit Warwickshire 0-6-0ST in OO/EM/P4 gauge.
- CSP Models brass kit Q Class 0-6-0ST in OO/EM/P4 gauge.
- CSP Models brass kit Burwarton/Cleobury 0-6-0ST in OO/EM/P4 gauge
