= Listed buildings in Stalisfield =

Civil Parish in Kent, England

Stalisfield is a village and civil parish in the Swale District of Kent, England. It contains 30 listed buildings that are recorded in the National Heritage List for England. Of these one is grade II* and 29 are grade II.

This list is based on the information retrieved online from Historic England .

== Key ==
Grade	Criteria
I	Buildings that are of exceptional interest
II*	Particularly important buildings of more than special interest
II	Buildings that are of special interest

== Listing ==
Name	Grade	Location	Type	Completed (Note: The date given is the date used by Historic England as significant for the initial building or that of an important part in the structure's description.)	Date designated	Grid ref. (Note: The grid reference is based on the British national grid reference system, sometimes known as OSGB36, used by the Ordnance Survey.) Geo-coordinates	Notes	Entry number (Note: The "List Entry Number" is a unique number assigned to each listed building and scheduled monument by Historic England.)	Image	Wikidata
Arketts	II				28 August 1986	TQ9500851712; 51°13′53″N 0°47′30″E		1355035	Upload Photo	Q26637839
Woodsell	II				24 January 1967	TQ9620853072; 51°14′35″N 0°48′35″E		1069197	Upload Photo	Q26321979
Rushmere Farmhouse	II	Almshouse Road			24 January 1967	TQ9780952280; 51°14′07″N 0°49′56″E		1069198	Upload Photo	Q26321981
Church of St Mary	II*	Church Road	church building		24 January 1967	TQ9673852434; 51°14′14″N 0°49′01″E		1025295	Church of St Mary More images	Q17546150
Apple Tree Cottage	II	Green Road			28 August 1986	TQ9553152846; 51°14′29″N 0°48′00″E		1343993	Upload Photo	Q26627750
Heel Farm	II	Heel Road			28 August 1986	TQ9762053040; 51°14′32″N 0°49′48″E		1203237	Upload Photo	Q26498789
Stables 20 Metres West of Heel Farmhouse	II	Heel Road			28 August 1986	TQ9759753058; 51°14′33″N 0°49′46″E		1069199	Upload Photo	Q26321983
The Old School House	II	Hillside Road			27 August 1952	TQ9637652826; 51°14′27″N 0°48′43″E		1281774	Upload Photo	Q26570789
Parsonage Farm	II	Kennelling Road			28 August 1986	TQ9595652153; 51°14′06″N 0°48′20″E		1343955	Upload Photo	Q26627716
Corner House	II	Otterden Road			28 August 1986	TQ9506254816; 51°15′33″N 0°47′39″E		1069200	Upload Photo	Q26321985
Barn 15 Metres North East of Green Farmhouse	II	Stalisfield Road			28 August 1986	TQ9553853078; 51°14′36″N 0°48′00″E		1069201	Upload Photo	Q26321987
Barn 40 Metres South East of Derbies Court	II	Stalisfield Road			24 January 1967	TQ9595354141; 51°15′10″N 0°48′24″E		1203276	Upload Photo	Q26498827
Barn and Wheel House 30 Metres East of Holbeam	II	Stalisfield Road			28 August 1986	TQ9713254381; 51°15′16″N 0°49′25″E		1203264	Upload Photo	Q26498815
Brisley House	II	Stalisfield Road			28 August 1986	TQ9543852734; 51°14′25″N 0°47′55″E		1203314	Upload Photo	Q26498861
Derbies Court	II	Stalisfield Road			27 August 1952	TQ9594954180; 51°15′11″N 0°48′24″E		1343957	Upload Photo	Q26627718
Forge Cottage	II	Stalisfield Road			28 August 1986	TQ9549353160; 51°14′39″N 0°47′58″E		1203304	Upload Photo	Q26498852
Godwins	II	Stalisfield Road			24 January 1967	TQ9544652878; 51°14′30″N 0°47′55″E		1203310	Upload Photo	Q26498857
Granary 30 Metres East of Derbies Court	II	Stalisfield Road			28 August 1986	TQ9595854155; 51°15′10″N 0°48′24″E		1069203	Upload Photo	Q26321991
Green Farmhouse	II	Stalisfield Road			28 August 1986	TQ9551553066; 51°14′36″N 0°47′59″E		1203249	Upload Photo	Q26498801
Holbeam Cottage	II	Stalisfield Road			28 August 1986	TQ9621454251; 51°15′13″N 0°48′38″E		1203256	Upload Photo	Q26498808
Holbeam Farmhouse	II	Stalisfield Road			24 January 1967	TQ9708754383; 51°15′16″N 0°49′23″E		1069202	Upload Photo	Q26321989
Oak Cottage	II	Stalisfield Road			24 January 1967	TQ9553553267; 51°14′42″N 0°48′01″E		1343956	Upload Photo	Q26627717
Redboro Cottage	II	Stalisfield Road			6 February 1974	TQ9552753252; 51°14′42″N 0°48′00″E		1281778	Upload Photo	Q26570794
Rooks Hill Cottage	II	Stalisfield Road			28 August 1986	TQ9565653959; 51°15′04″N 0°48′08″E		1343958	Upload Photo	Q26627719
Shire Lane Cottage	II	Stalisfield Road			28 August 1986	TQ9539952609; 51°14′21″N 0°47′52″E		1343959	Upload Photo	Q26627720
The Plough Inn	II	Stalisfield Road	pub		27 August 1952	TQ9543152942; 51°14′32″N 0°47′55″E		1069205	The Plough Inn More images	Q26321995
Threshing Barn 20 Metres West of Valley Farm House	II	Stalisfield Road			28 August 1986	TQ9562553987; 51°15′05″N 0°48′07″E		1069204	Upload Photo	Q26321993
Valley Farm House	II	Stalisfield Road			24 January 1967	TQ9565954004; 51°15′06″N 0°48′08″E		1203290	Upload Photo	Q26498839
Horse Wheel 5 Yards North of Wingfield Farmhouse	II	Wingfield			16 February 1977	TQ9529555169; 51°15′44″N 0°47′52″E		1203346	Upload Photo	Q26498891
Wingfield Farmhouse	II	Wingfield			16 February 1977	TQ9529155161; 51°15′44″N 0°47′52″E		1069206	Upload Photo	Q26321998

== See also ==
- Grade I listed buildings in Kent
- Grade II* listed buildings in Kent

== Sources ==
- Newman, John (2013) [1969], Kent: North-East and East, The Buildings of England, New Haven and London: Yale University Press, ISBN 978-0-300-18506-5
