= Listed buildings in Oare, Kent =

Historic structures in Kent, England

Oare is a village and civil parish in the Swale District of Kent, England. It contains 17 listed buildings that are recorded in the National Heritage List for England. Of these one is grade I, one is grade II* and 15 are grade II.

This list is based on the information retrieved online from Historic England .

== Key ==
Grade	Criteria
I	Buildings that are of exceptional interest
II*	Particularly important buildings of more than special interest
II	Buildings that are of special interest

== Listing ==
Name	Grade	Location	Type	Completed (Note: The date given is the date used by Historic England as significant for the initial building or that of an important part in the structure's description.)	Date designated	Grid ref. (Note: The grid reference is based on the British national grid reference system, sometimes known as OSGB36, used by the Ordnance Survey.) Geo-coordinates	Notes	Entry number (Note: The "List Entry Number" is a unique number assigned to each listed building and scheduled monument by Historic England.)	Image	Wikidata
17, Church Road	II	17, Church Road			21 May 1986	TR0065562999; 51°19′50″N 0°52′44″E		1069090	Upload Photo	Q26321785
9, Church Road	II	9, Church Road			21 May 1986	TR0064962971; 51°19′50″N 0°52′44″E		1069091	Upload Photo	Q26321787
Barn 15 Metres South East of Pheasant Farmhouse	II	Church Road			4 May 1977	TR0076263260; 51°19′59″N 0°52′50″E		1122007	Upload Photo	Q26415139
Chest Tomb to Cock Family About 5 Metres North West of Church of St Peter, Oare	II	Church Road			21 May 1986	TR0078063334; 51°20′01″N 0°52′51″E		1069127	Upload Photo	Q26321850
Church House	II	66 and 68, Church Road			21 May 1986	TR0074863360; 51°20′02″N 0°52′50″E		1069089	Upload Photo	Q26321783
Church of St Peter	I	Church Road	church building		24 January 1967	TR0078863323; 51°20′01″N 0°52′52″E		1069126	Church of St Peter More images	Q17530032
Court Lodge Farmhouse	II	Church Road			21 May 1986	TR0057163610; 51°20′10″N 0°52′41″E		1344015	Upload Photo	Q26627771
Headstone to Edward Cock, About 5 Metres North West of Church of St Peter, Oare	II	Church Road			21 May 1986	TR0077563332; 51°20′01″N 0°52′51″E		1069088	Upload Photo	Q26321781
Headstone to Thomas and Mary Mockett, D.1750, About 7 Metres North West of Church of St Peter, Oare	II	Church Road			21 May 1986	TR0077463332; 51°20′01″N 0°52′51″E		1344014	Upload Photo	Q26627770
Homeside with Railings to Forecourt	II*	Church Road			21 May 1986	TR0065362964; 51°19′49″N 0°52′44″E		1344016	Upload Photo	Q17546548
Monument 3 Metres South of Church of St Peter, Oare	II	Church Road			21 May 1986	TR0079563316; 51°20′00″N 0°52′52″E		1121978	Upload Photo	Q26415111
Pheasant Farmhouse	II	Church Road			4 May 1977	TR0075163297; 51°20′00″N 0°52′50″E		1069125	Upload Photo	Q26321848
Three Mariners Inn	II	Church Road	pub		24 January 1967	TR0065662913; 51°19′48″N 0°52′44″E		1338204	Three Mariners Inn More images	Q26622550
Cheesman's House	II	Luddenham			13 August 1975	TQ9987862860; 51°19′47″N 0°52′04″E		1069098	Upload Photo	Q26321799
1, Mount Pleasant	II	1, Mount Pleasant			19 October 1978	TR0065162890; 51°19′47″N 0°52′44″E		1121868	Upload Photo	Q26415011
Mount House	II	Mount Pleasant			24 January 1967	TR0062162882; 51°19′47″N 0°52′42″E		1069099	Upload Photo	Q26321800
Mount Pleasant	II	2 and 3, Mount Pleasant			19 October 1978	TR0064462885; 51°19′47″N 0°52′43″E		1344021	Upload Photo	Q26627776

== See also ==
- Grade I listed buildings in Kent
- Grade II* listed buildings in Kent

== Sources ==
- Newman, John (2013) [1969], Kent: North-East and East, The Buildings of England, New Haven and London: Yale University Press, ISBN 978-0-300-18506-5
