= Uplees =

Hamlet in Kent, England

Coordinates: 51.3434°N 0.8694°E

- Location within Kent
- Civil parish: Oare
- District: Swale
- Shire county: Kent
- Region: South East
- Country: England
- Sovereign state: United Kingdom
- Post town: Faversham
- Postcode district: ME13 0
- Police: Kent
- Fire: Kent
- Ambulance: South East Coast

Uplees is a remote hamlet north of Faversham, Kent in southeast England. It was a key part of the Faversham explosives industry during World War I, with the Cotton Powder Company importing raw materials via the deepwater channel of the Swale, and the associated Explosives Loading Company exporting completed bombs and shells. Employees came to work from Faversham on the Davington Light Railway of which Uplees was the northern terminus. It is in the civil parish of Oare.

At 2.20pm on Sunday 2 April 1916, a huge explosion ripped through the gunpowder mill at Uplees, when 200 tons of TNT ignited. The blast killed 105 people and many were buried in a mass grave at Faversham Cemetery.
