= Davington Light Railway =

Former narrow gauge railway in Kent, England

Coordinates: 51.318°N 0.885°E

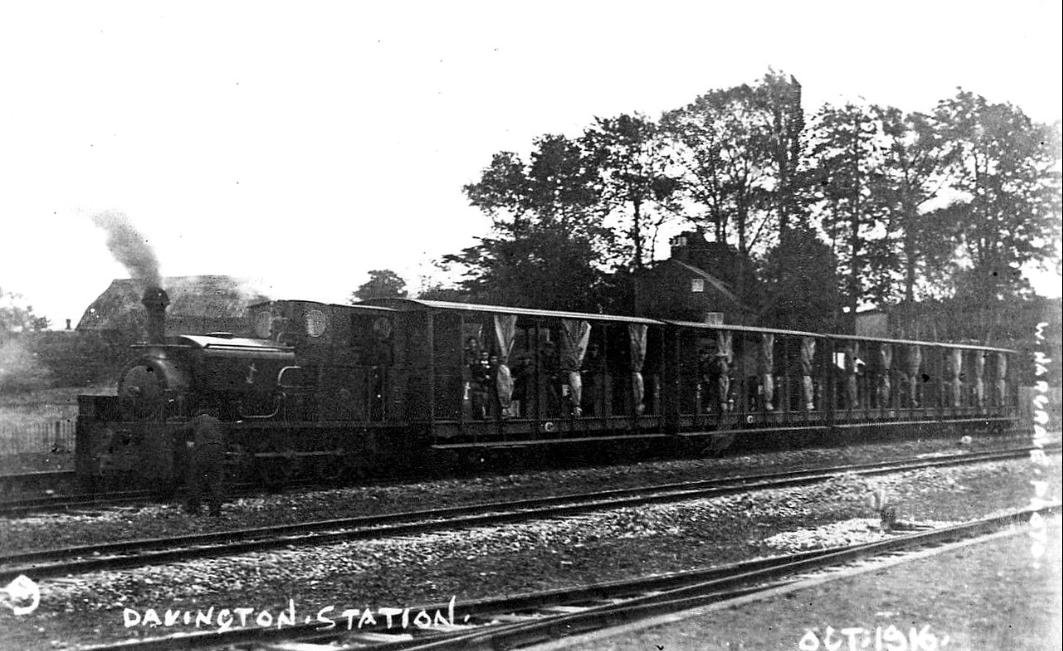
- Locomotive No.1, 0-6-0ST, built 1916 by Manning Wardle & Co., works No. 1914

Overview
- Headquarters: Davington
- Locale: England
- Dates of operation: 1916–1919
- Successor: Abandoned

Technical
- Track gauge: 1,000 mm (3 ft 3 3/8 in) metre gauge
- Length: 3 miles (4.8 km)

The Davington Light Railway was a narrow gauge railway built to serve the armaments factories near Davington, in Kent, England. It ran between Davington and Uplees.

== History ==
Munitions have been produced at Faversham since 1561. Three gunpowder factories had been established by 1786, though a serious explosion in 1847 put a temporary end to production. In 1873, the Cotton Powder Company built a factory to produce gun cotton on Uplees Marsh. In 1912, a second factory was built by the Explosives Loading Company, with a third by Eley Brothers Ltd. established nearby at Harty Ferry.

The outbreak of the First World War saw a massive increase in the need for munitions. The mills in the marshes near Faversham were a major production centre, sending their output by river barges to the Royal Arsenal at Woolwich. Hundreds of workers were travelling daily across the marshland from nearby villages and towns to work in the mills. 1916 was a particularly wet year, and these journeys became intolerable. In order to efficiently move workers to and from the factories, the Davington Light Railway was laid between Davington and between Uplees.

The carriages were all open sided, with curtains to keep the weather out. As well as the terminus stations, there was also a halt at Oare. Separate trains were provided for men and women, on account of the coarse language the men used.

Freight was also carried, including acid, coal, cotton, detonators, mines and shells. Four wagons from the Davington Light Railway were purchased by Colonel Stephens for use on the Rye and Camber Tramway.

The line closed at the end of World War I, and the line and its equipment were sold by auction. During World War II, the tunnel at Oare was used as an air raid shelter. The station sites at Davington and Uplees have been obliterated by development, but the route of the trackbed at Oare can be traced, and the tunnel under the road at Oare still exists.

== Route ==
The southern terminus of the railway was at Davington, where there was a station with goods yard and locomotive shed. The line headed northwards across the marshes. The first station was about 1,000 yards (910 m) north at Oare, where a halt was provided. The line then entered the 80.5 feet (24.5 m) Oare Tunnel, passing under a minor road. The line was climbing through the tunnel and continued to the low summit. From there it dropped down towards The Swale as it crossed Uplees Marches. The northern terminus of the passenger line was at Uplees Station.

== Locomotives ==
Number	Builder	Wheel Arrangement	Date built	Works number	Notes
1	Manning Wardle	0-6-0ST	1916	1914	Sold after the railway closed; exported to Brazil
2	Manning Wardle	0-6-0ST	1916	1915	Sold after the railway closed; exported to Brazil. Was used at Imbituba Docks.
3	Manning Wardle	0-6-0ST	1916	1916	Sold after the railway closed; exported to Brazil. Was used at Imbituba Docks.

One of the locomotives is believed to be still in existence. Often quoted as works number 1916, the actual locomotive would appear to be works number 1915, carrying the worksplate of its sister.

== Gauge ==
According to Taylor, the gauge was 3 ft 3 in (990 mm) but some other sources give 1,000 mm (3 ft 3 3/8 in). The exact gauge will probably never be known.

The Davington Light Railway was built to the gauge that was already in use at the explosives factories. The first locomotive there was a German-built Deutz petrol locomotive, delivered just before the start of World War I. Possibly this was of 1,000 mm (3 ft 3 3/8 in) gauge and the track was built to fit it. The Deutz locomotive was later supplemented by five Ruston Proctor petrol/paraffin locomotives, one of which is owned by the Vale of Rheidol Railway and stored at Aberystwyth, where it is shown as ex-Cotton Powder Company Ruston Proctor 4wPM, works no 51168 of 1916; it was built to 1,000 mm (3 ft 3 3/8 in).

== Sources ==
- Mitchell, Vic; Smith, Keith (2000). Kent Narrow Gauge. Middleton Press. ISBN 1-901706-45-1.
- Taylor, M. Minter (1968). The Davington Light Railway (Locomotion Papers No. 40 ed.). The Oakwood Press. ISBN 0-85361-002-9.

== See also ==
- British industrial narrow gauge railways
- British military narrow gauge railways
- Faversham explosives industry
