= Bexon =

Hamlet in Kent, England

Coordinates: 51.3033°N 0.7109°E

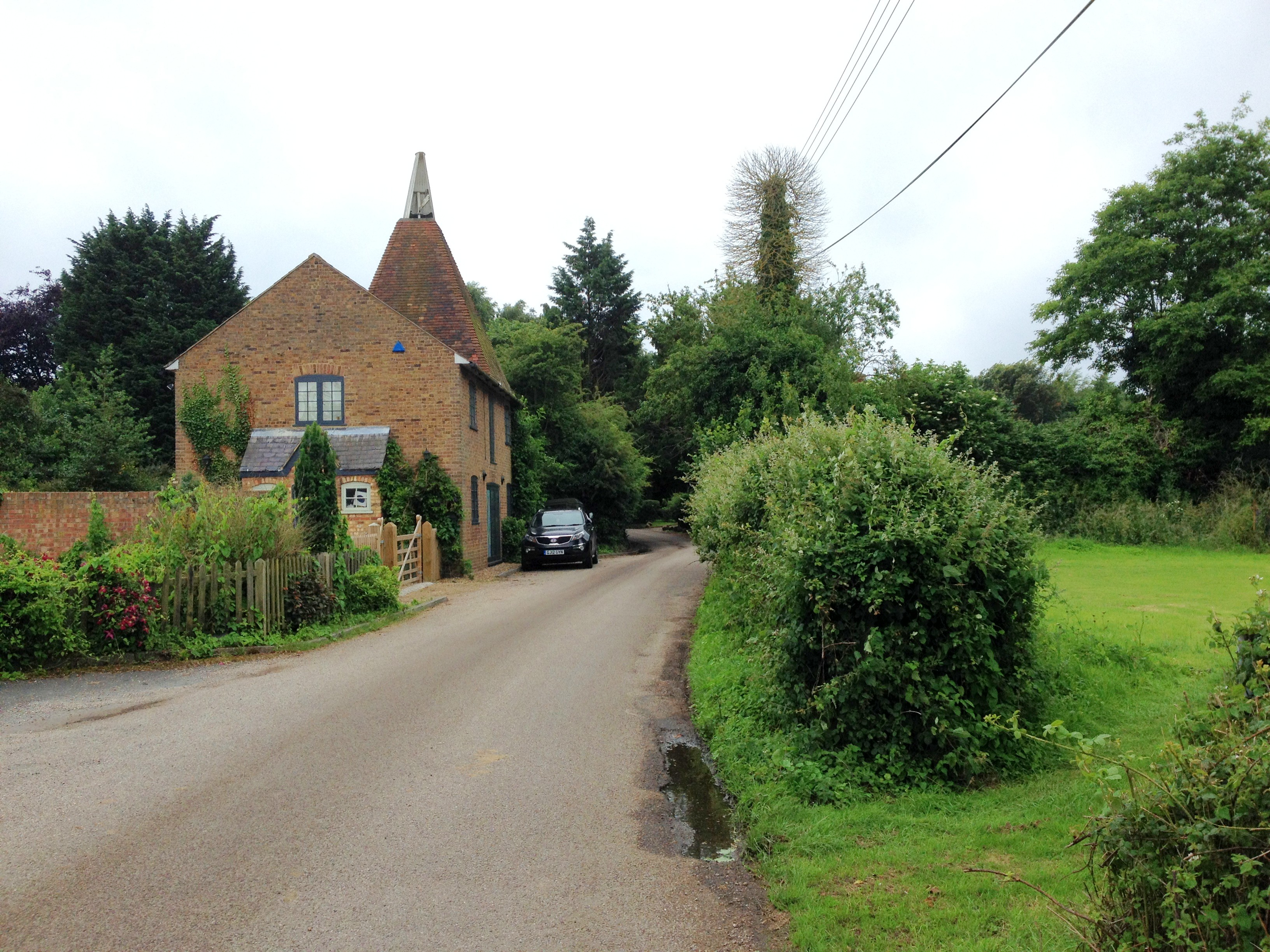
- Hawks Hill Lane

- Location within Kent
- OS grid reference: TQ8959
- District: Swale
- Shire county: Kent
- Region: South East
- Country: England
- Sovereign state: United Kingdom
- Post town: Maidstone
- Postcode district: ME
- Police: Kent
- Fire: Kent
- Ambulance: South East Coast
- UK Parliament: Faversham and Mid Kent

Bexon is a hamlet in Kent, England, situated North of the parishes of Frinsted and Bicknor, just south of the M2 motorway.
