= Oare, Kent =

Village in Kent, England

Coordinates: 51.330°N 0.878°E

Oare
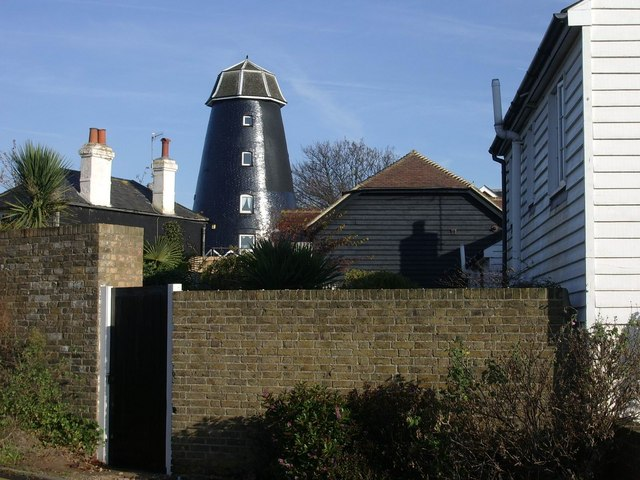
- Oare windmill

- Location within Kent
- Population: 513 (2011 Census Including Uplees)
- Civil parish: Oare
- District: Swale
- Shire county: Kent
- Region: South East
- Country: England
- Sovereign state: United Kingdom
- Post town: FAVERSHAM
- Postcode district: ME13
- Police: Kent
- Fire: Kent
- Ambulance: South East Coast
- UK Parliament: Sittingbourne and Sheppey

Oare is a village and civil parish north of Davington, Faversham in southeast England. It is separated from Faversham by the Oare Creek. To the north of the village are the Oare Marshes, and the Harty Ferry which once linked to Harty on the Isle of Sheppey. Kent Wildlife Trust manages a nature reserve that is an important stopping place for migratory birds.

According to Edward Hasted, in 1798, it was part of the hundred of Faversham. It was once anciently recorded as 'Ore', meaning fenny or marshy place in the Anglo-Saxon language.

The manor of Oare belonged to Odo of Bayeux, the Bishop of Bayeux and half-brother of William the Conqueror, and was noted so in the Domesday Book of 1086. After Odo's trial for fraud, the manor passed to the Arnulf Kade who gave it to the Knights Hospitallers.

During Edward VI's reign, it passed to Lord Clinton (a relative of Edward Clinton, Lord Clinton).

Historically, Oare was the southern terminus of the Harty Ferry, which ran across the Swale channel between the then Isle of Harty and the mainland.

The village has a church on the outskirts dedicated to St Peter. The 13th-century church is Grade I listed.

The village also has two public houses, the Grade II-listed, Shepherd Neame-run Three Mariners Inn and The Castle.

== Industry ==
Oare Windmill, across the Oare boundary and in Faversham, is believed to date from about 1819. Originally a corn mill, after 1879 it was owned and operated by the Gun Powder Company as part of the Faversham area's explosives industry. During the First World War, the Mill was requisitioned by the government. In 1963, it was converted into a private home.

Between 1916 and 1919, the Davington Light Railway ran close to the village and took workers from Oare halt to the main munitions factories at Uplees.

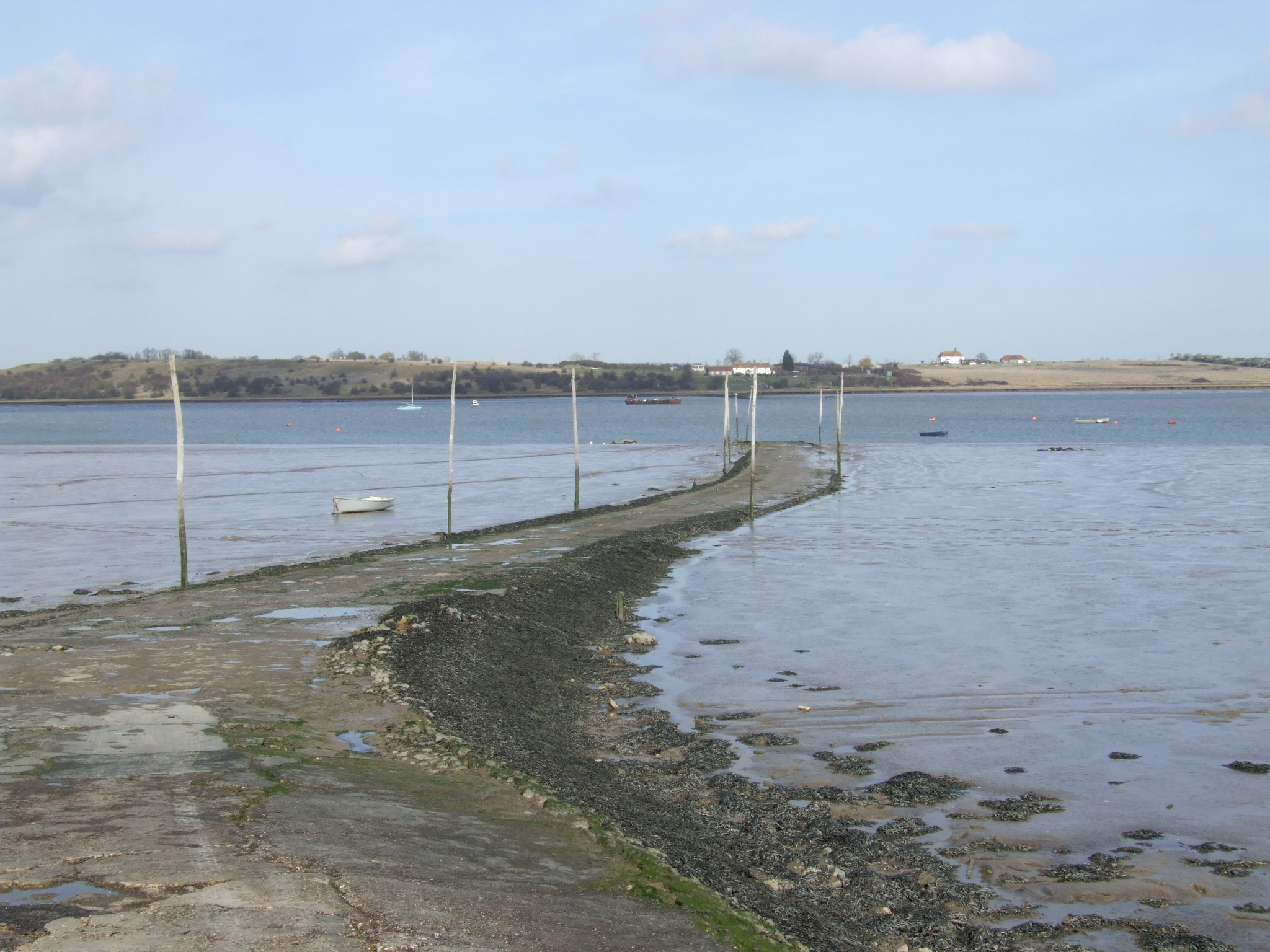
North of the village is the Swale, here is the causeway at the Harty ferry, and over the water to Sheppey.

== See also ==
- Listed buildings in Oare, Kent
