= Davington =

Suburb of Faversham, Kent, England

Coordinates: 51.319°N 0.884°E

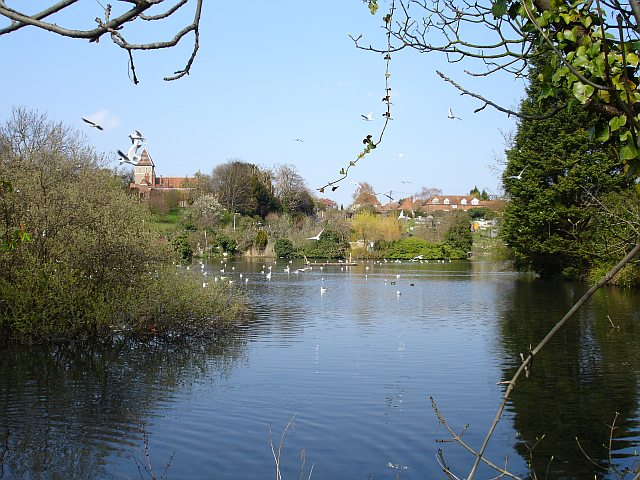
- Stonebridge Pond

- Location within Kent
- Civil parish: Faversham
- District: Swale
- Shire county: Kent
- Region: South East
- Country: England
- Sovereign state: United Kingdom
- Police: Kent
- Fire: Kent
- Ambulance: South East Coast

Davington is a suburb of Faversham, in the Swale district, in the county of Kent, England.

Davington Priory is a local government ward within the Faversham Town Council and Swale Borough Council areas. Until the civic boundary changes were brought into effect in 2004, the electoral ward had broadly mirrored the ecclesiastical parish of Davington.

== Geography ==
It forms the western section of the town, including Bysing Wood and Bysing Wood fishing lakes. But the ward of Davington also encompasses Luddenham and Oare and other nearby rural areas. The parish's most striking geographical feature is the sharply defined ridge, up which Davington Hill, Brent Hill and Dark Hill travel, with the parish church sitting at its top. The ridge runs south-west to north-east, losing height as it approaches the marshes and sea. Its topography is similar to the ridge upon which Bysing Wood stands further to the west of the area, near Oare.

The ecclesiastical parish has large areas of post-war housing developments, as well as industrial estates and complexes along the Oare Road and the Western Link Road. These include Brett's (quarry firm), GIST (business logistics company) and Shepherd Neame Brewery also has a warehouse, as well as in the town centre of Faversham.

== History ==
Davington was an ancient parish. The parish was fairly rural and essentially was a cluster of houses around the parish church and school, as well as a few widely distributed farm houses and cottages around. It became a civil parish in 1866, but the civil parish was abolished on 1 April 1935. Most of the parish became part of Faversham, but smaller areas were added to the civil parishes of Luddenham and Oare. In 1931 the parish had a population of 173.

Post-war residential development connected the parish to the centre of Faversham.

== Notable buildings ==
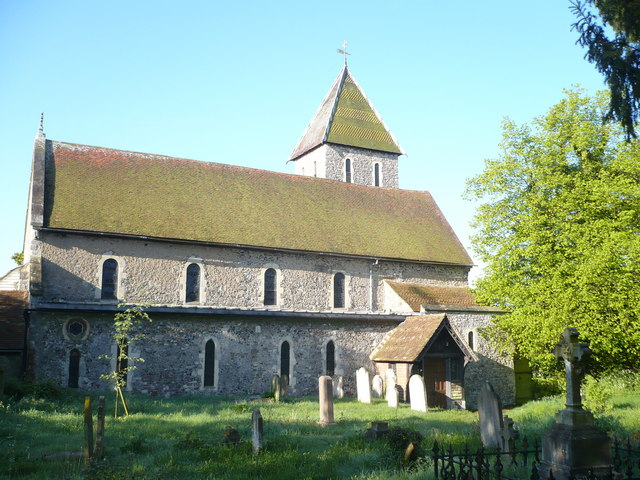
The Church of St Mary Magdalene and St Lawrence

Davington church is a prominent and much-loved local feature, which stands on top of a ridge above Stonebridge Pond. The Norman Priory Church is dedicated to St Mary Magdalene and St Lawrence and is the oldest existing building in the Faversham area. Most of its building construction dates from the second half of the twelfth century. Beside it, is a Priory house. This is largely the remains of Davington Priory, which was founded in 1153 for a prioress and her 26 Benedictine nuns. It is well known for being the home of Bob Geldof.

Other important buildings in the parish include Davington Farmhouse and Davington Manor.

== Amenities ==
Davington also had its own light railway, the Davington Light Railway. Built in 1916, the three mile track was mainly used for passenger traffic. It was also very short-lived and closed in 1919. It linked Davington with the high explosives factories of the Cotton Powder Company and Explosives Loading Company between Uplees and Harty Ferry near Oare.

The parish also has two pubs, Albion Tavern (Shepherd Neame) and Brents Tavern. It also has the popular Davington Primary School.

Also included within the parish is the Faversham Angling Club Lakes and nearby Oare Gunpowder Works (now a country park).
