= Thomas Willement =

British stained glass artist (1786–1871)

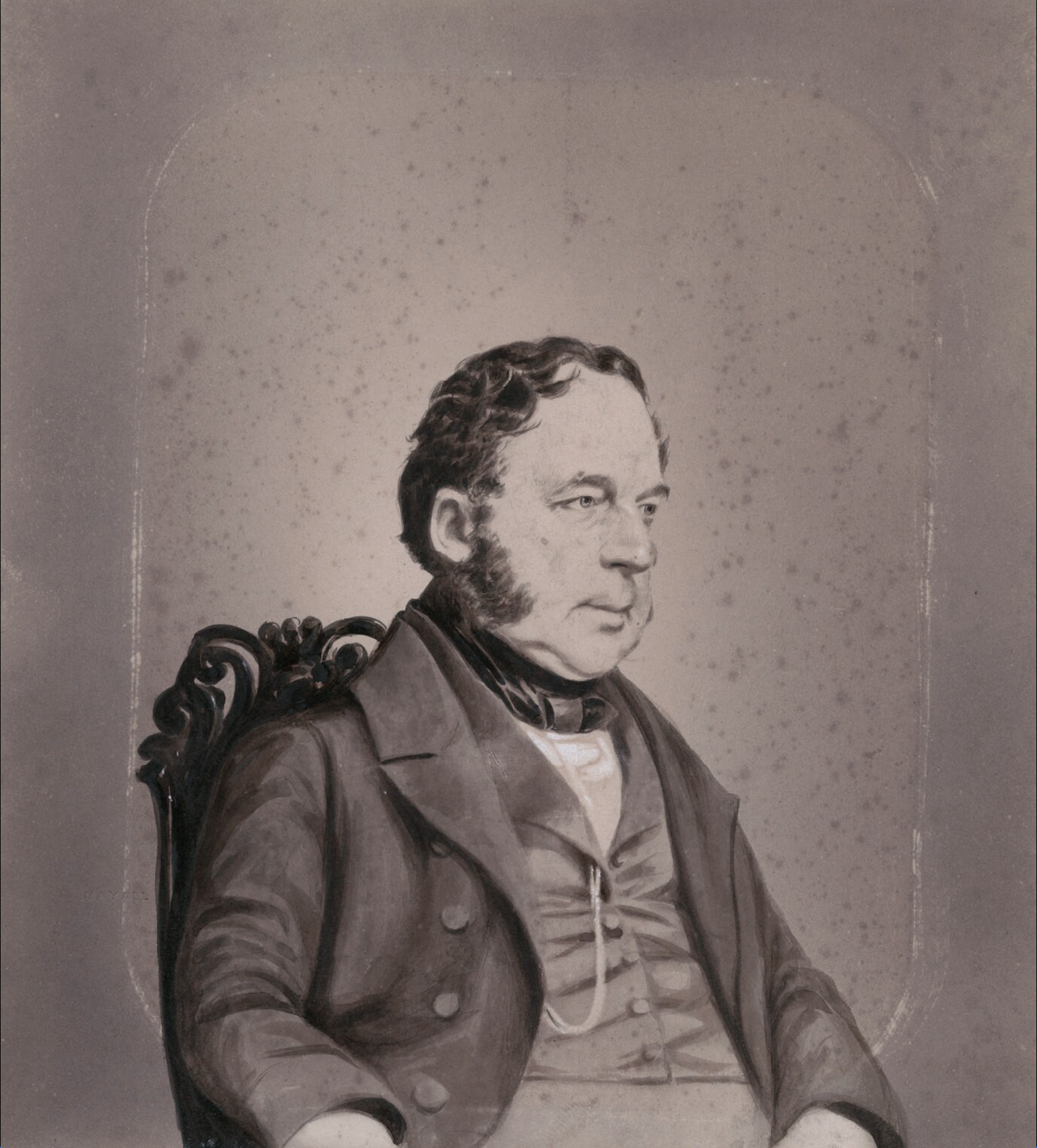
- Thomas Willement, 1845
- Born: July 18, 1786; Marylebone
- Died: 10 March 1871 (aged 84); Davington Priory
- Notable work: Regal heraldry: the armorial insignia of the kings and queens of England, from coeval authorities (1821); Heraldic Notices of Canterbury Cathedral; with Genealogical and Topographical Notes (1827); Facsimile of a contemporary roll with the names and the arms of the sovereign and of the spiritual and temporal peers who sat in parliament held at Westminster AD1515 (1829); A Roll of Arms of the Reign of Richard the Second (1834); Historical Sketch of the Parish of Davington, in the County of Kent and of the Priory there (1862)
- Spouse: Katherine Griffith (1796–1852)
- Children: Arthur Thomas Willement (1833–1854)

Thomas Willement (18 July 1786 – 10 March 1871) was an English stained glass artist and writer, called "the father of Victorian stained glass", active from 1811 to 1865.

== Life ==
Willement was born at St Marylebone, London, the son of Thomas Willement, a painter of coaches and heraldry. As a young man Willement worked at his father's business at 25 Green Street, Grosvenor Square. (Note: Willement took the lease of the premises himself in 1822.) Like many early 19th century provincial stained glass artists, Willement started out as a plumber and glazier: two distinct trades both requiring lead-working skills. Willement became a leading and proficient stained-glass artist, reviving the medieval method of composing a window from separate pieces of coloured glass rather than painting pictures on glass with coloured enamels.

Willement married Katharine Griffith in 1817. Their son, Arthur Thomas, was born in 1833 and died at Oxford in 1854, aged 21. Katherine died in 1852. Willement died in 1871, aged 84, and was buried alongside his wife in the vault of St Mary Magdalene, Davington, which he had restored (see Davington Priory).

== Historical background ==
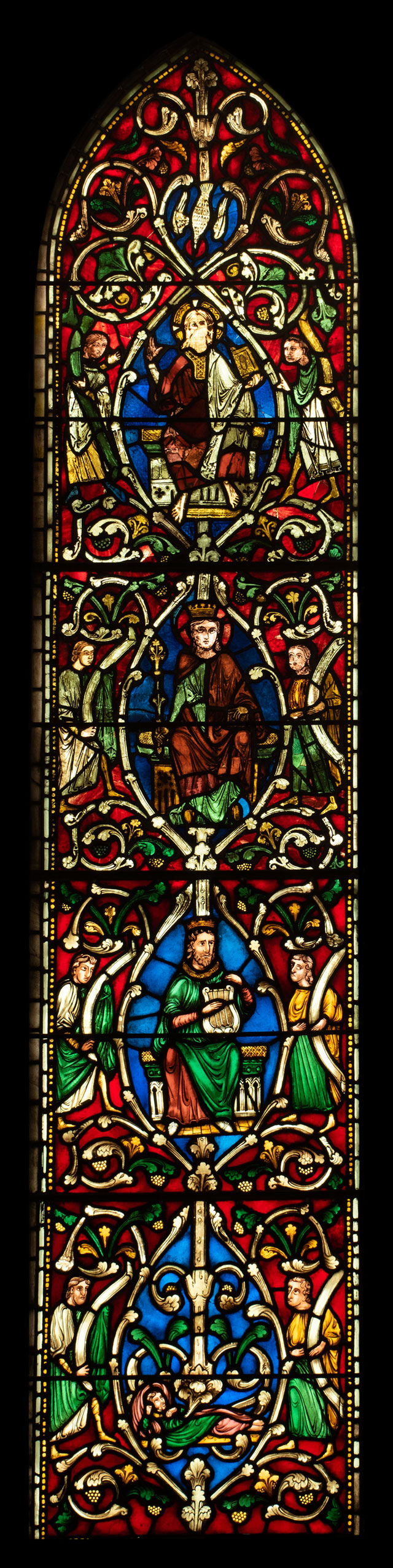
East window, Church of St Mary Westwell c1220, restored by Willement

The great period of medieval stained glass manufacturing between 1100 and the Tudor period ended in England after the Dissolution of the Monasteries under Henry VIII and the destruction of the Church's artworks by Puritans during the Parliamentary period. Those few windows produced between 1500 and 1800 were generally of painted glass: the colours applied by brush to the surface of the glass and fired to anneal them, rather than the artist piecing numerous sections of coloured glass together.

Through observation and restoration of surviving windows (such as the 14th century west window of York Minster, and the 12th century Jesse Tree in the east window of the Church of St Mary, Westwell (see picture).), Willement reinvented the ancient method of leading coloured pieces and integrating the visually black lines created between the colours by the lead cames into the design of the window, and developed the artistic method of arranging figures one to each single light, surmounted by a decorative canopy.

Willement was also an expert on heraldry, which informed much of his work and restoration, and on which he published several authoritative works (see Bibliography).

== Works ==
Willement's first window was installed in 1812 in Caerhays Castle, Cornwall for John Trevanion, (Note: "THE window of the principal staircase, containing the badges of the several Dukes of Cornwall ; and other heraldic ornaments. In the windows of the entrance-hall, shields of the several arms which are quartered by the family of Trevanion.") and Willement established a lucrative business decorating and installing heraldic stained glass in the country houses of landed gentry.

In 1829 Willement installed windows in Goodrich Court, (Note: Demolished in 1950) Herefordshire for Sir Samuel Meyrick, to whose Specimens of Ancient Furniture (1836) he later contributed. Willement would later work with the architect of Goodrich Court, Edward Blore, on a number of projects, including St George's Chapel, Windsor, and the Great Hall of Hampton Court Palace. (Note: Willement also provided stained glass for houses designed by Blore, including Crewe Hall in 1834 (unfortunately destroyed by fire in 1866) and Crom Castle, Ireland in 1840.) In 1831 Willement repaired and replaced the entirety of the 'ancient stained glass' in the windows of the Great Hall of Charlecote Park in Warwickshire, for George Lucy. In 1832 Willement began an extended association with architect Anthony Salvin, which would include work at Penrhyn Castle in Wales, (Note: "TWO extremely large windows for the great hall, containing the signs of the Zodiac with representations of the labours of the corresponding months. The other parts filled with elaborate ornaments of the richest colours.") Mamhead House in Devon, (Note: "A LARGE window for the principal staircase; two windows in the corridor; six large compartments of fruit in ornamental frames for the dining-room; six of flowers for the drawing-room; others in various parts of the mansion.") Rufford Abbey in Nottinghamshire, (Note: "TWO heraldic compartments for the windows of the library.") Scotney Castle in Kent and Harlaxton in Lincolnshire. (Note: "A LARGE heraldic window for the bay of the great banqueting-hall; the series of shields shewing the descents from the illustrious families of De Ligne, De la Marck, D'Aremberg, &c.") Between 1833 and 1840 Willement repeatedly supplied windows and decorated Alton Towers, Staffordshire, for the Earl of Shrewsbury.

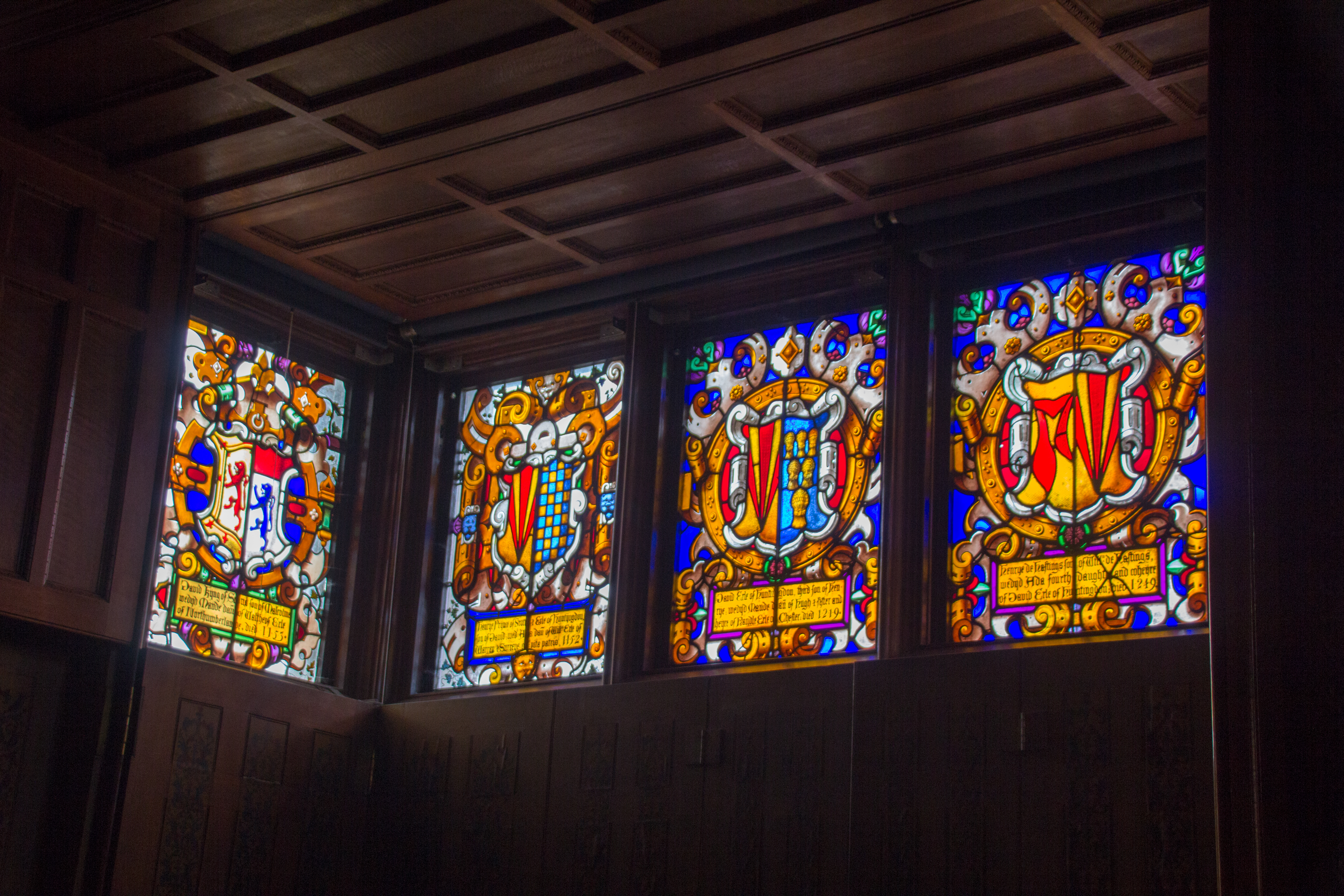
Charlecote Park, 1831

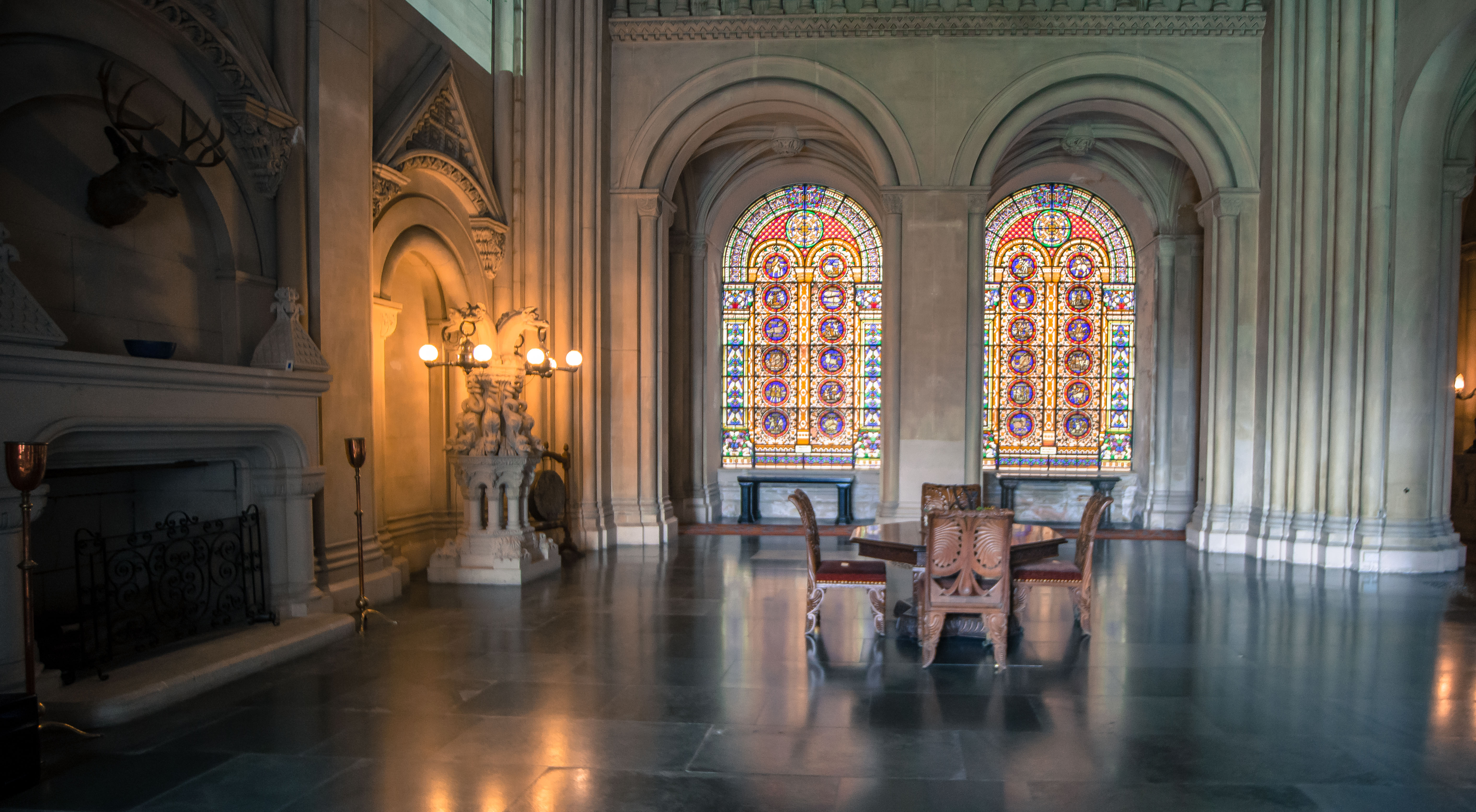
Great Hall, Penrhyn Castle, 1835

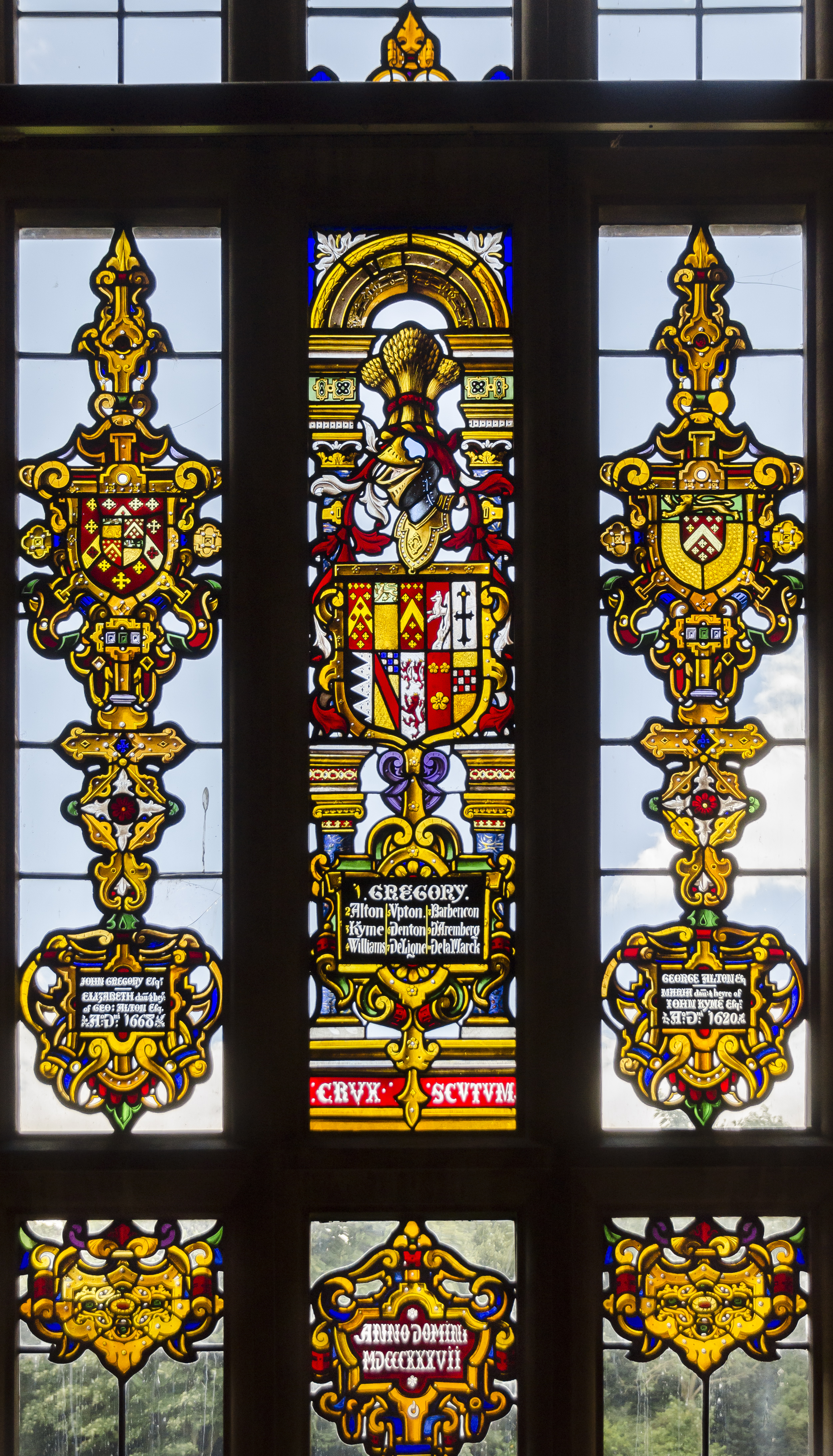
Great Hall, Harlaxton Manor, 1837

Willement's work with churches began during this period, including St Martin of Tours, Epsom in 1824, (Note: The east window installed by Willement was replaced in 1892, but two roundels remain.) the east window of St Peter ad Vincula Church, Hampton Lucy, Warwickshire in 1837 (see image below), (Note: "A LARGE altar window (vide Frontispiece), containing subjects from the life of St. Peter, to whom the church is dedicated, and the armorial bearings of the principal benefactors to the parish. At the lower part is a scroll inscribed. " mdcccxxxv. Hanc vitriam fieri fecit Johannes Lucy A. M. hujus ecclesiae rector.") and Saint Michael and All Angels, Barbados in 1838. In the Great Hall of Christ's Hospital, Newgate, between 1836 and 1840 Willement installed massive windows memorialising the arms of the Governors. (Note: The Great Hall of Christ's Hospital was destroyed by bombing during the Second World War)

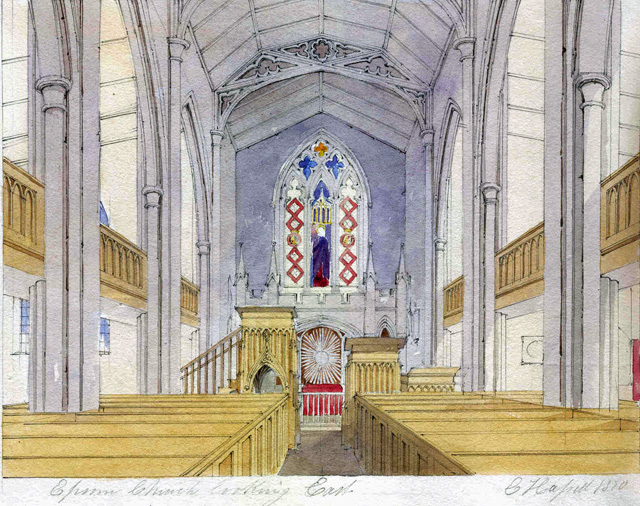
St Martin of Tours, Epsom, 1830

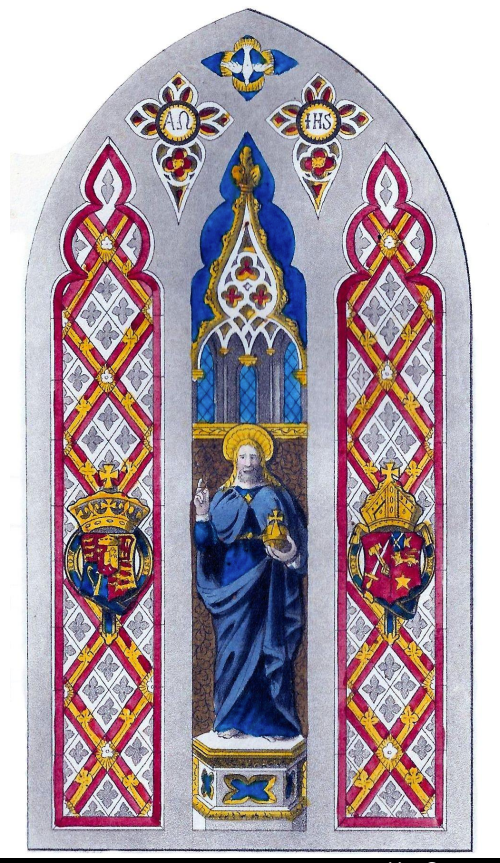
Design for East Window, St Martin's Epsom, 1825

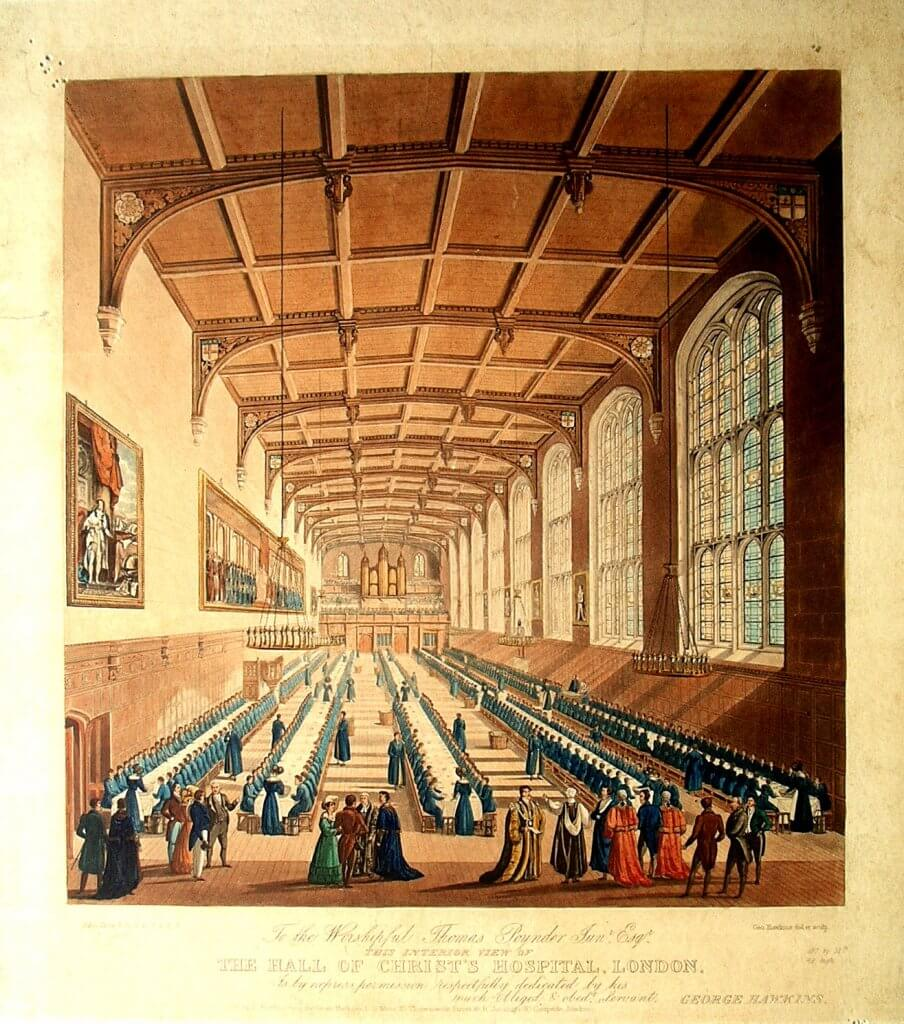
Christ's Hospital, Newgate 1830

In 1832 Willement was elected a fellow of the Society of Antiquaries, and at some point appointed heraldic artist to George IV. Willement became an advocate of the Cambridge Camden Society (established 1839) who promoted a return to a medieval style of architecture in the structure of new churches and the restoration of existing churches. Willement's association with the society introduced him in 1840 to Augustus Pugin, the ecclesiastical architect and designer of churches. Willement worked on several projects for Pugin (including the chapel of the Convent of our Lady of Mercy, Handsworth, and the Chapel and School of the Hospital of St John, Alton), however Willement ultimately suffered a falling-out with Pugin, who was sometimes critical of Willement's historical accuracy, (Note: Putin drafted full-sized designs for the windows made by Willement for the Chapel and School of the Hospital of St John, after Willement made what Pugin reported to Lord Shrewsbury as a 'stupid mistake' in representing the hand of Mary in a window for the Convent of Our Lady of Mary.) and accused him of being mercenary. (Note: Writing to the Earl of Shrewsbury in February 1842 regarding the Alton works, Pugin lamented: "I believe that Willement thinks only of making money, and if he had a contract spoils the job. But Cottingham will make amends for this for the church will be glazed at one-third the cost. I will never work with Willement again." Pugin also fell out with Willement's pupil, William Warrington, whom he described as 'expensive as Willement".)

The break with Pugin did not set back Willement's success, and Willement was appointed, by Royal Patent, "Artist in Stained Glass" to Queen Victoria. In July 1840 Willement was appointed by the Dean and Canons of Windsor to supply four heraldic windows (Note: In honour of the Knights of the Garter, continuing a series commenced by Francis Eginton in 1781.) for the Quire of St George's Chapel, Windsor, beginning an association with the Chapel which would last until 1861. During this period, Willement designed and completed thirty new stained glass windows for the Chapel, and restored the Great West Window, and windows in the Oliver King and Beaufort Chapels. In 1844 Willement published An Account of the Restorations of the Collegiate Chapel of St George, Windsor: with some particulars of the heraldic ornaments of that edifice, a detailed account of the heraldy and decorations of the Chapel, and Willement's restorations thereof. (Note: The book contains only a few references to stained glass.)

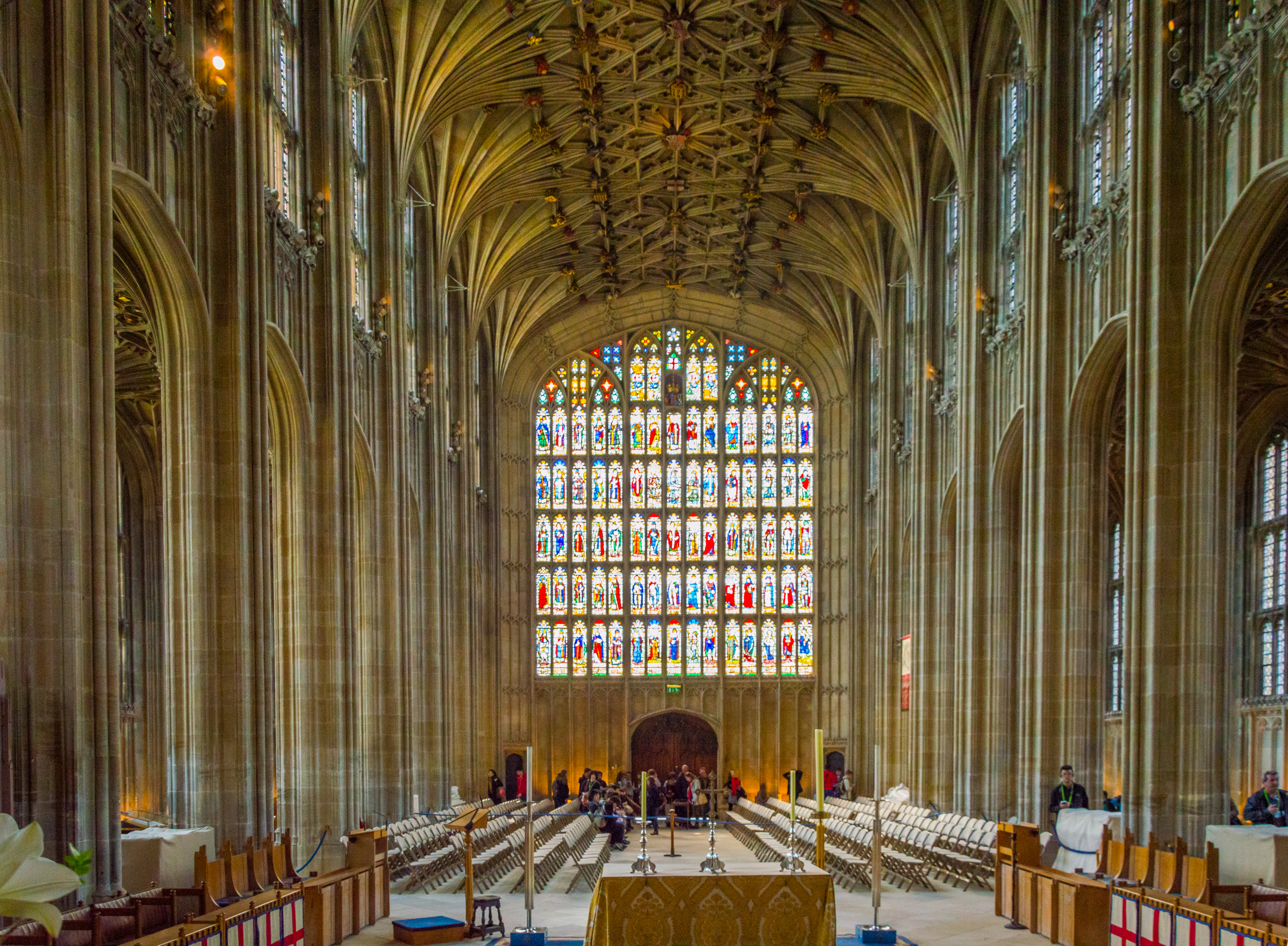
West Window, St George's Chapel Windsor, restored by Willement

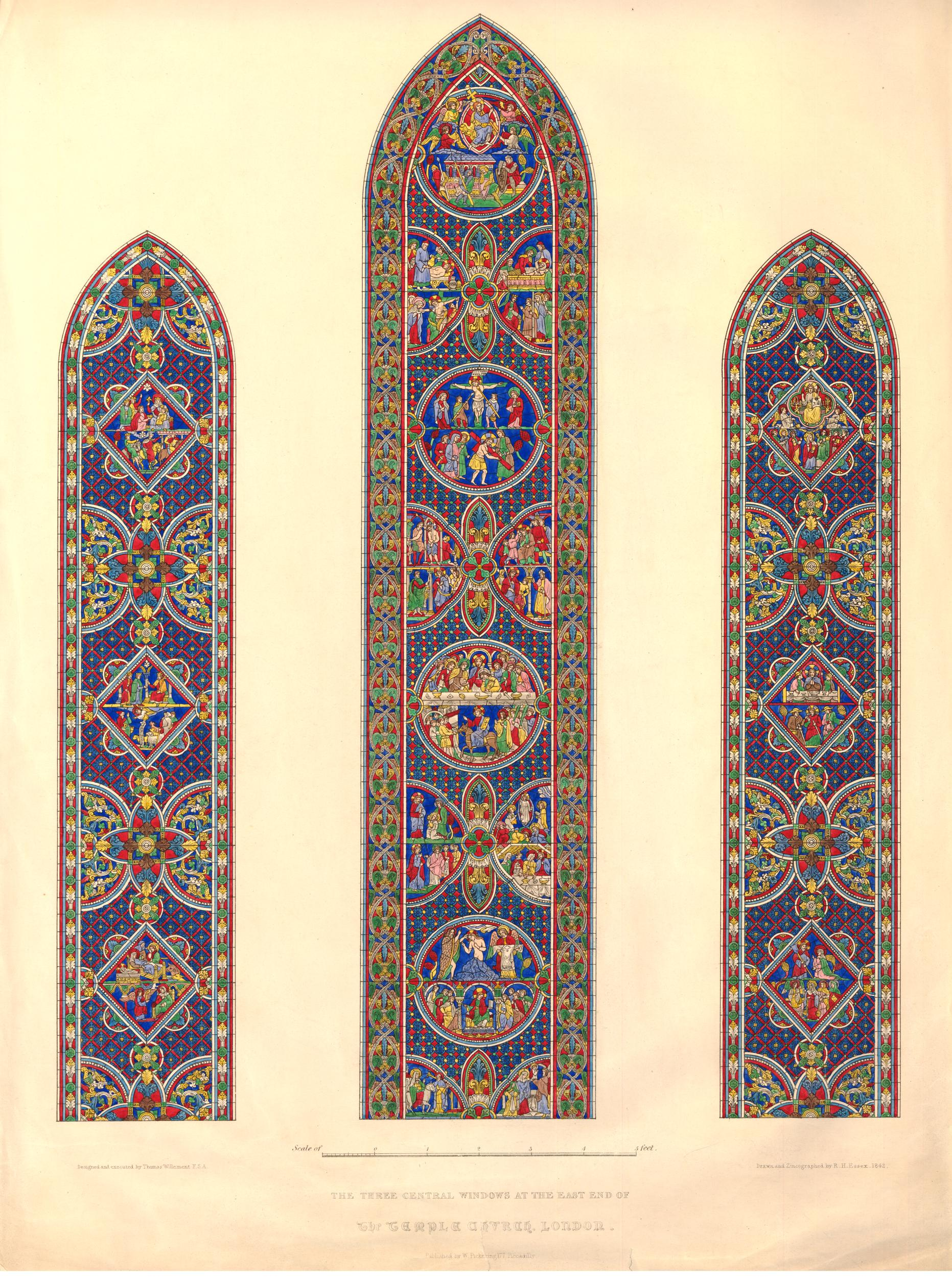
Lithograph of The Three Central Windows at the East End of Temple Church,1842

In 1842 Willement contributed to the restoration of Temple Church London by architects Sydney Smirke and Decimus Burton, who sought to revert Christopher Wren's 17th century Classical renovations to Victorian Gothic. Willement supplied three stained glass windows for the east end of the Church depicting scenes from the life of Jesus, and other decoration. The windows were ultimately destroyed in the Blitz, but a roundel in the nave survived (see Rose Window in Selected works).

Willement's final commission was to provide the east window of the Savoy Chapel, after a fire in 1864 nearly destroyed the chapel. Willement had previously renovated the chapel ceiling and reglazed the east window after a fire in 1842.

== Davington Priory ==
By 1845 Willement, aged 59, had become wealthy and looked around for a home with a suitable resonance in which to spend his later years. He purchased Davington Priory near Faversham in Kent, a nunnery established in the 12th century and complete with its own church (the buildings had been spared in the Dissolution because by 1527 there were only three elderly nuns remaining). Willement restored and extended the buildings to make a comfortable home, and installed his own heraldic glass with the motto "Thynke and Thanke". Since he owned the church as well, he refurbished it with stained glass and had Taylors of Loughborough install five bells, each cast with the same motto, in the bell tower.

Davington Priory has since 1983 been the home of the musician Bob Geldof.

Davington Priory, 1807 by Henry Petrie, when the Norman church was in use as a stable

Willement's arms at Davington Priory

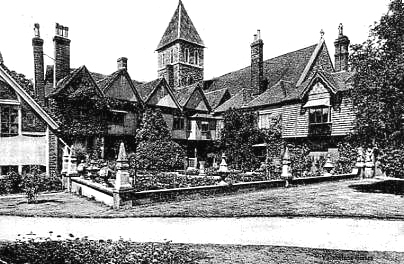
Davington Priory, c. 1910

== Selected works ==
Willement comprehensively documented his early work (1812–1840) in A Concise Account of the Principal Works in Stained Glass that have been Executed by Thomas Willement (1840). Modern surveys encompassing Willement's entire career may be found in Wilkinson (1964) and Wright (1964–65). A select list of buildings holding extant prominent examples of Willement's work follows.

Note that a considerable proportion of Victorian-era and Gothic revival stained glass, including works by Willement, has not survived to the present day, due to:

- demolition (e.g. Holy Trinity Church, Carlisle; Drakelow Hall, Derbyshire; Goodrich Court, Herefordshire),
- accidents (e.g. Crewe Hall, destroyed by fire),
- removal (e.g. Jesus College, Cambridge, St Katharine's Church, Regent's Park), and
- wartime bombing (e.g. Temple Church, London; Great Hall of Christ's Hospital, London; St Luke's Church, Chelsea).

=== Royal buildings ===
- Great Hall, Hampton Court Palace, Greater London (1844)
- St George's Chapel, Windsor Castle, Berkshire (1840–1861)

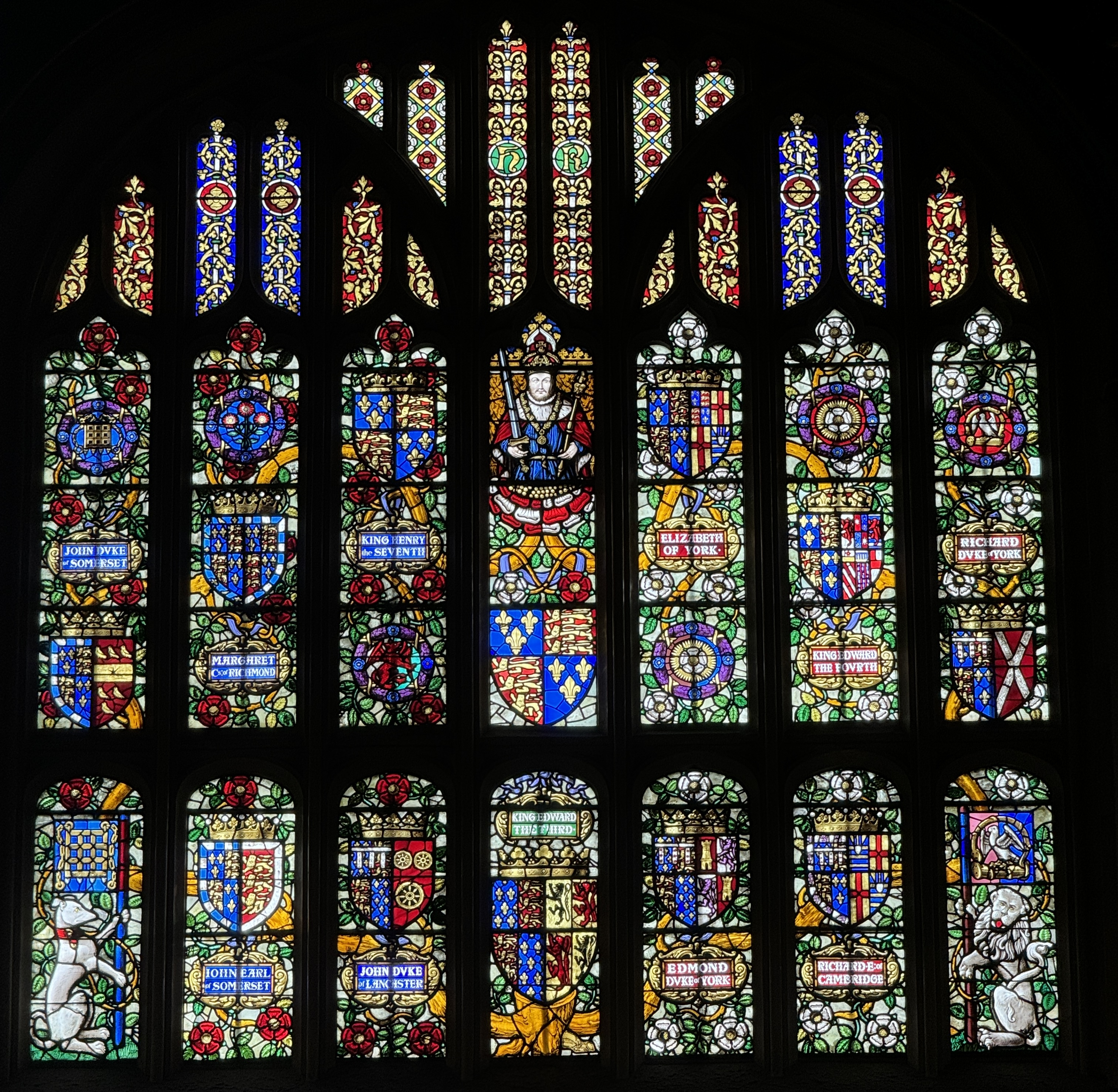
East Window

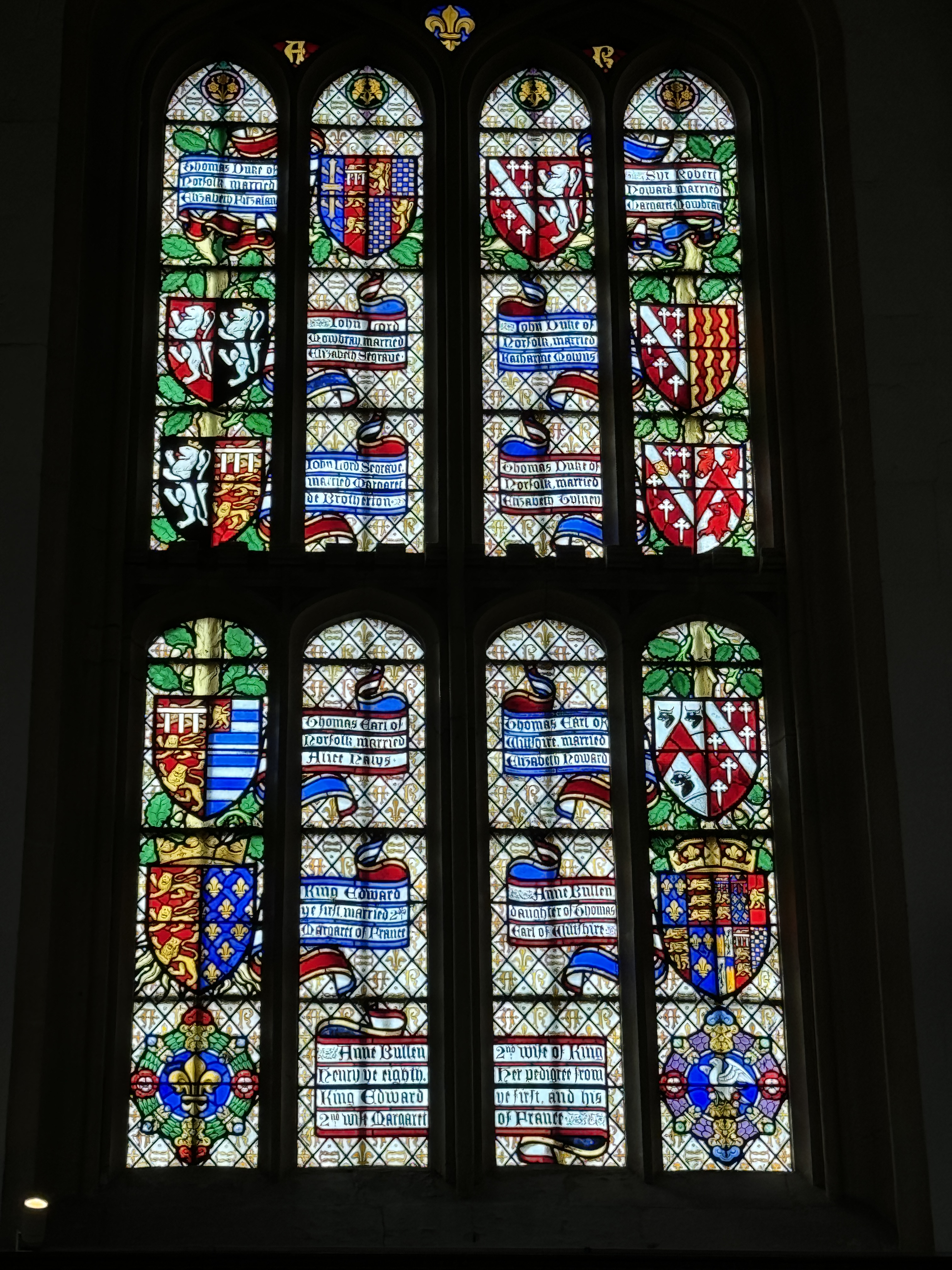
"Anne Bullen"

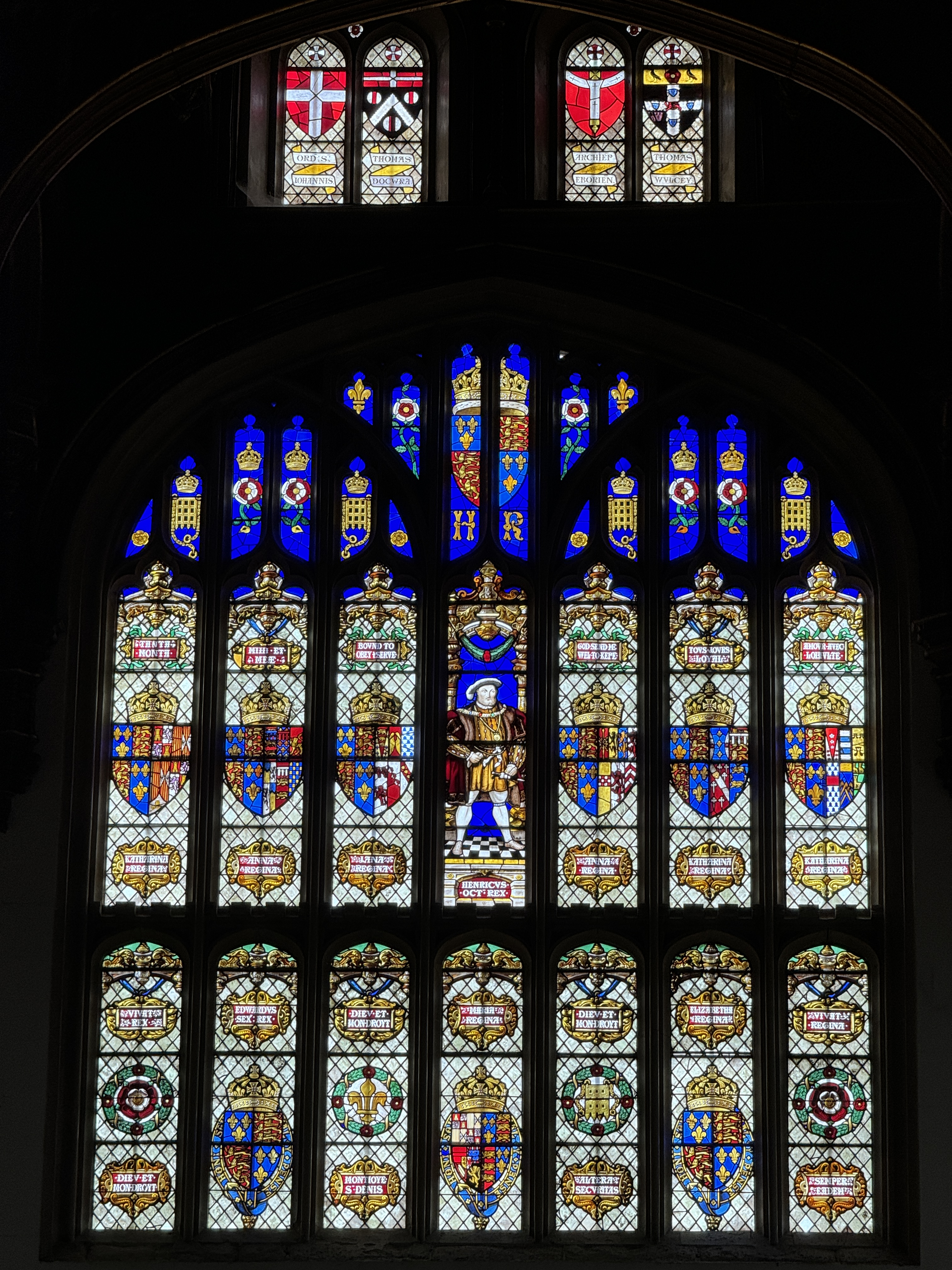
West Window

Great Hall, Hampton Court Palace

=== Places of worship ===
- St Bartholemew's Church, Cresswell, Northumberland (1836–1857)
- St Peter ad Vincula Church, Hampton Lucy, Warwickshire (1837- east window)
- Temple Church, City of London (1842 – Rose Window)
- Almshouse Chapel, Faversham, Kent (west window installed early 20th century, originally installed c1845 in St Mary's of Charity, Faversham)
- Church of Saint Peter and Saint Paul, Harlington, (1845)
- Saint Michael and All Angels' Church, Badminton, Gloucestershire (1846–47 – windows featuring blue borders and badges in the yellow of the Duke of Beaufort's livery)
- All Saints' Church, Freethorpe, Norfolk (c. 1849)
- St Laurence's Church, Ludlow, Shropshire (1860 – west window)
- St John's Church, Devizes, Wiltshire (1843 – chancel east window)
- Wells Cathedral, Wells, Somerset (1845 – restoration of east window of Lady Chapel)
- St Nicholas' Church, Kemerton, Worcestershire (1847 – east window, south aisle)
- St Peter's Church, Huddersfield, West Yorkshire (1852)
- Savoy Chapel, Westminster (1865 – east window)

Hampton Lucy, Warwickshire, 1837

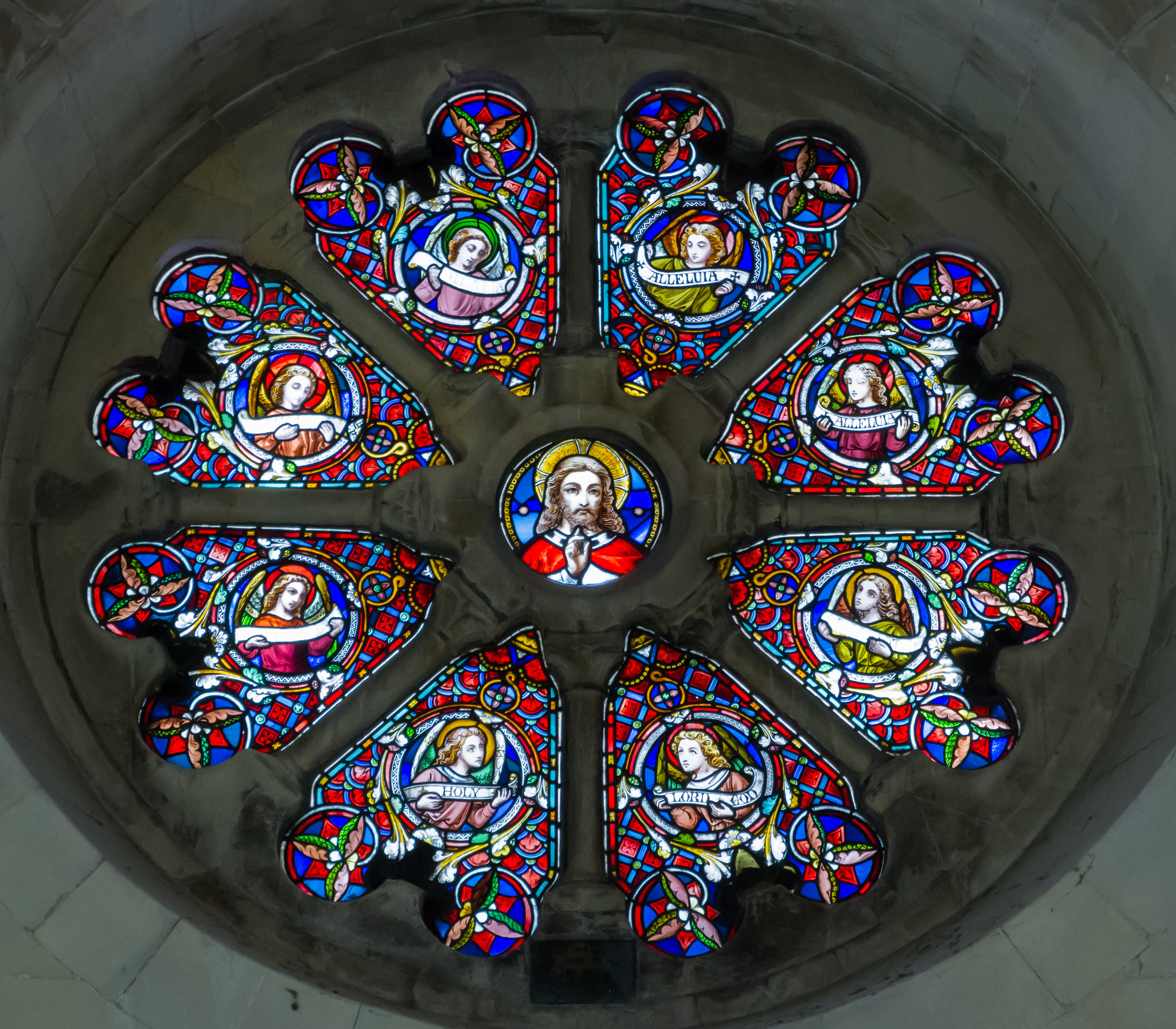
Temple Church, London 1842

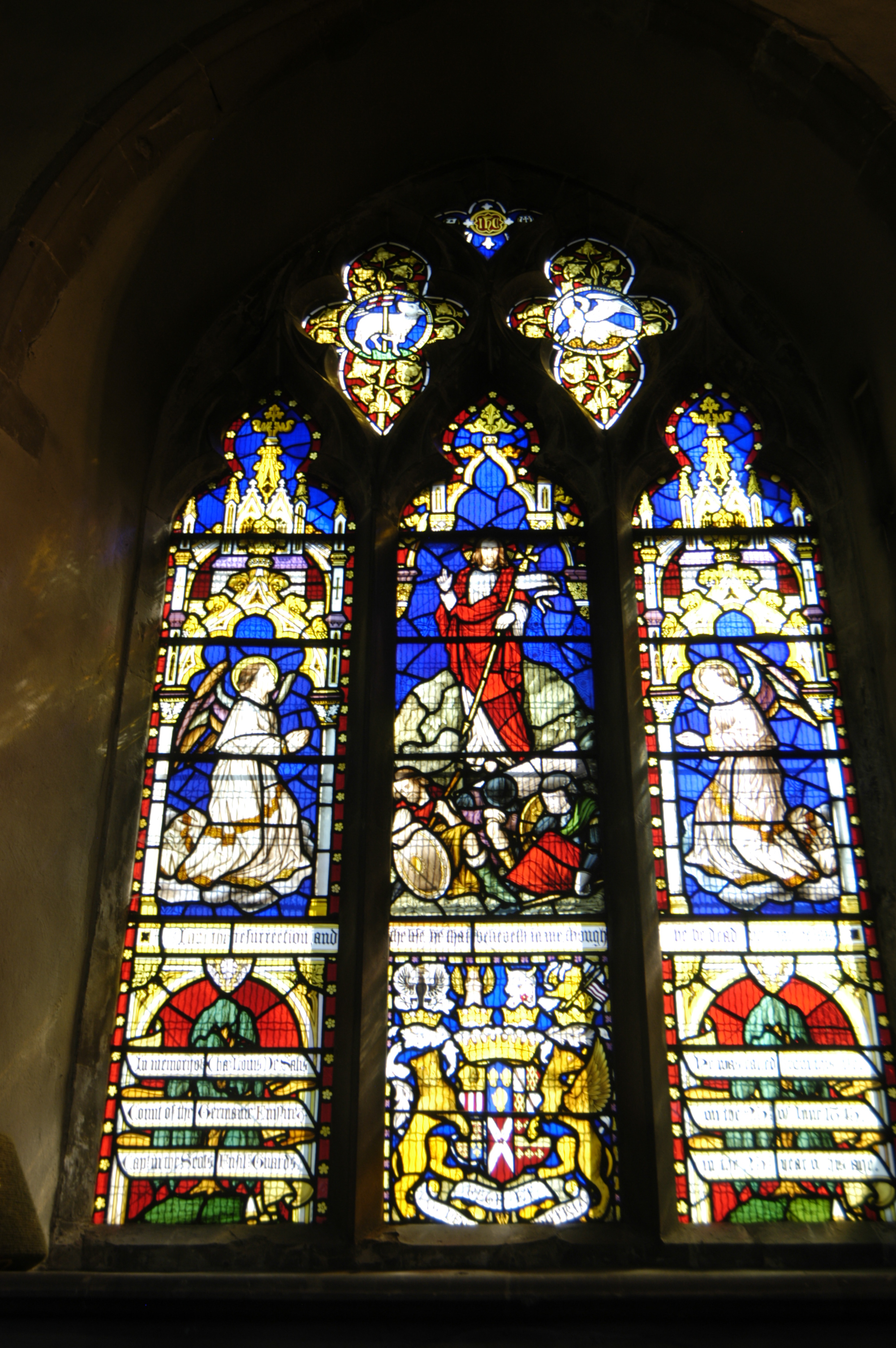
Saints Peter & Paul, Harlington, 1845

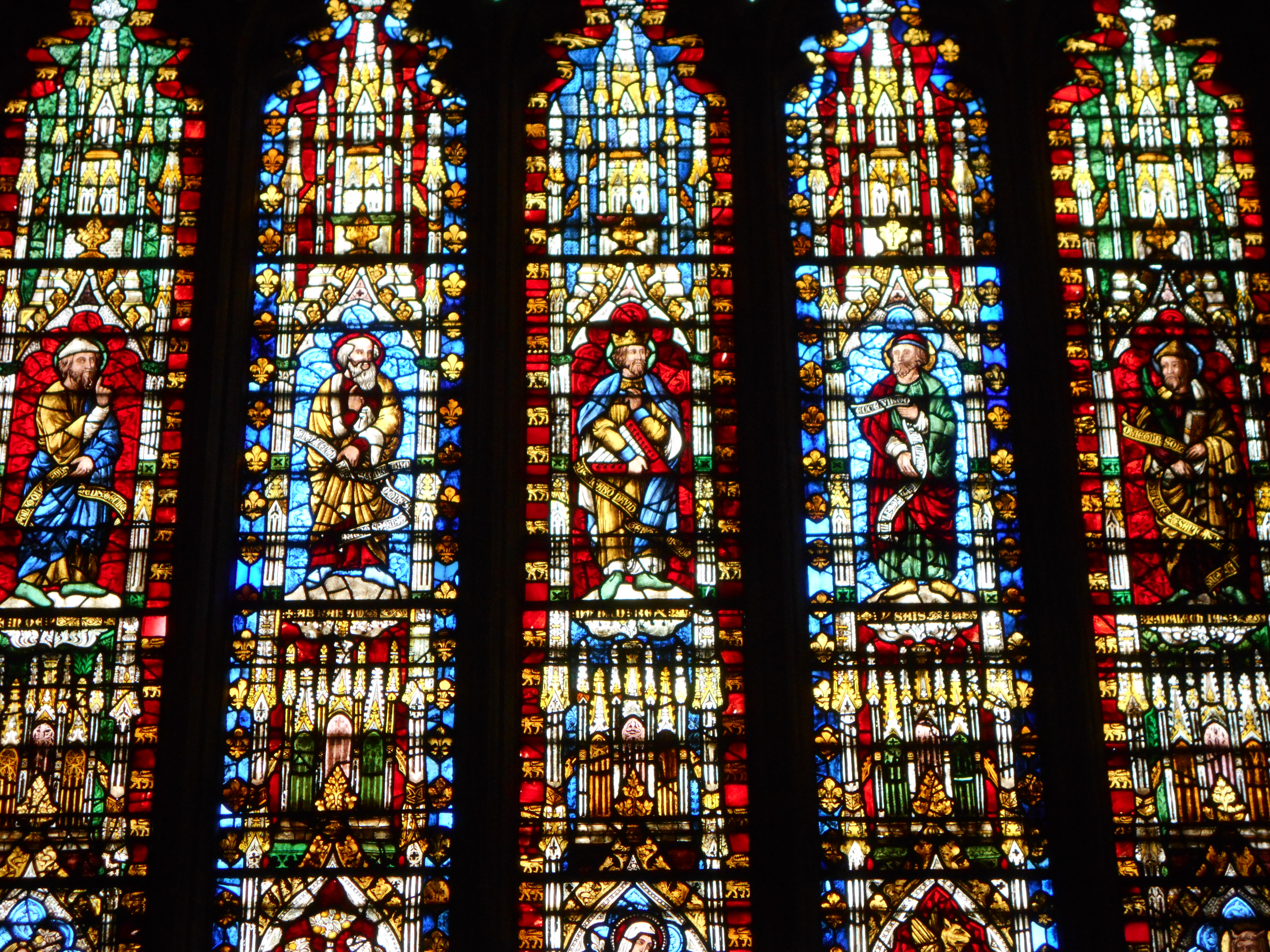
Detail of the east window of the Lady Chapel of Wells Cathedral, restored by Willement 1845

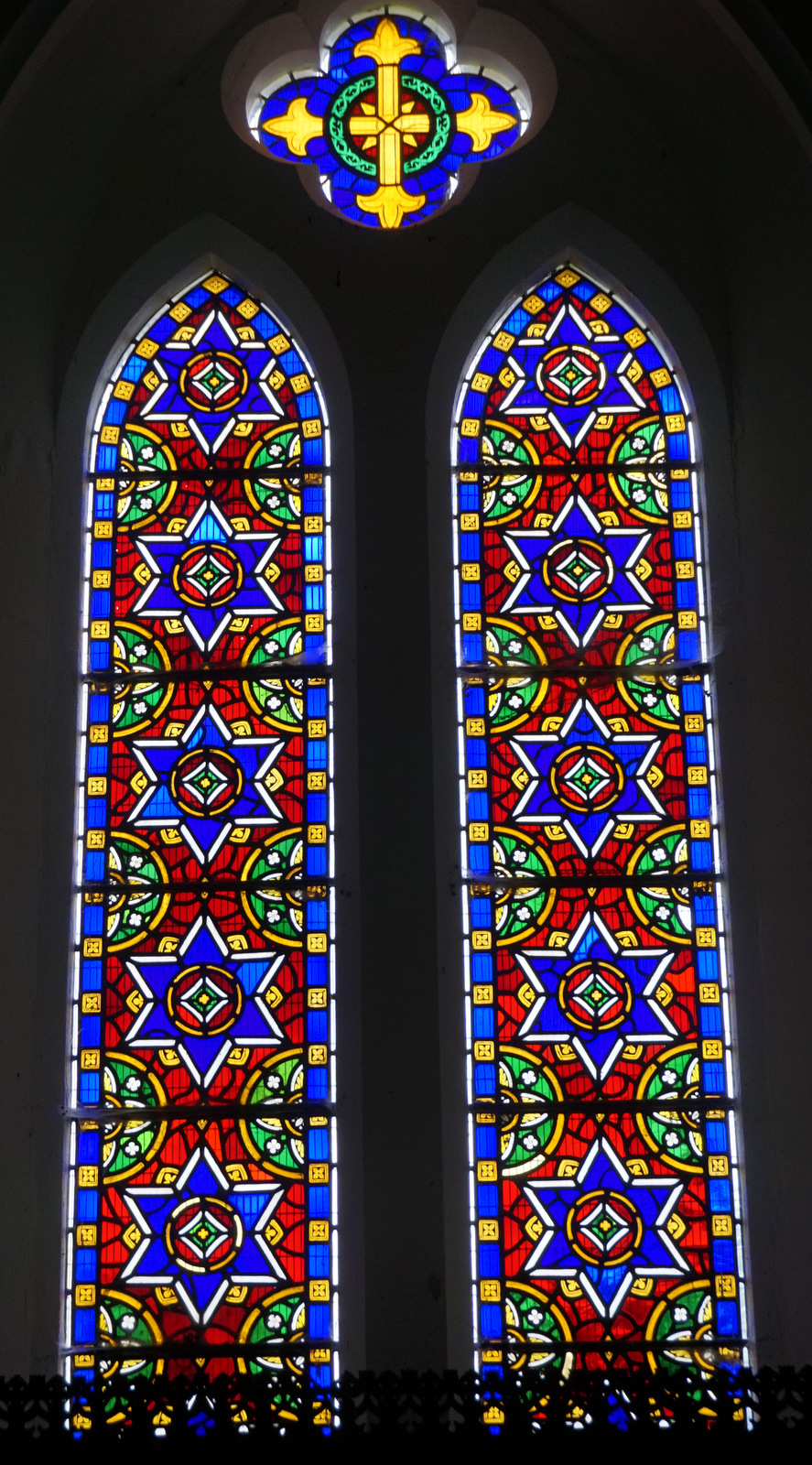
All Saints, Freethorpe, 1849

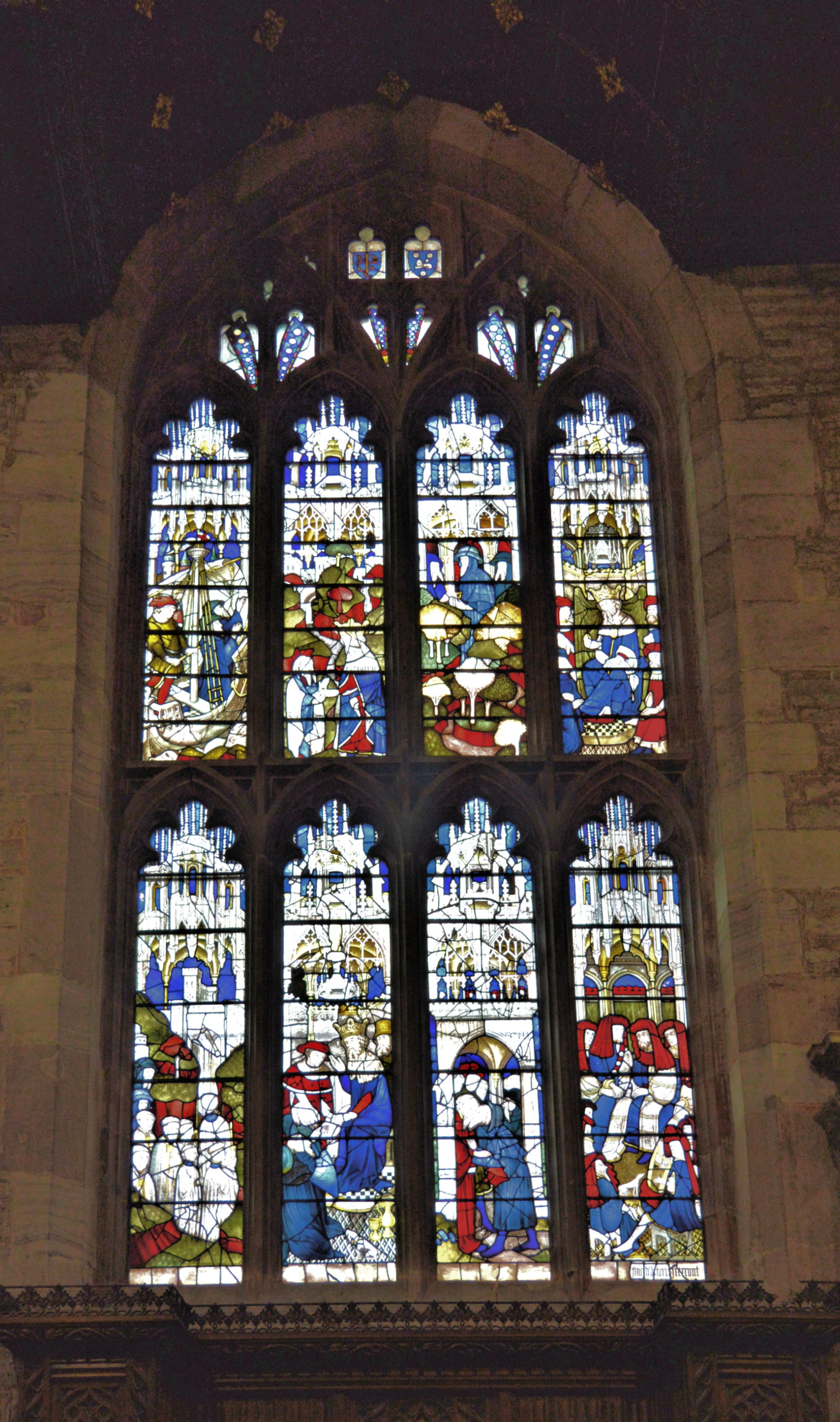
St Laurence's, Ludlow, 1860

=== Houses ===
- Charlecote Park, Warwickshire (1831)
- Alton Towers, Staffordshire (1833–1940)
- Penrhyrn Castle, Llandygai, Gwynedd (1835-37 – Great Hall)
- Harlaxton Manor, Lincolnshire (1837)
- Wimpole Hall, Cambridgeshire (1838 – heraldic panel on main staircase)

== Bibliography ==
=== As author ===
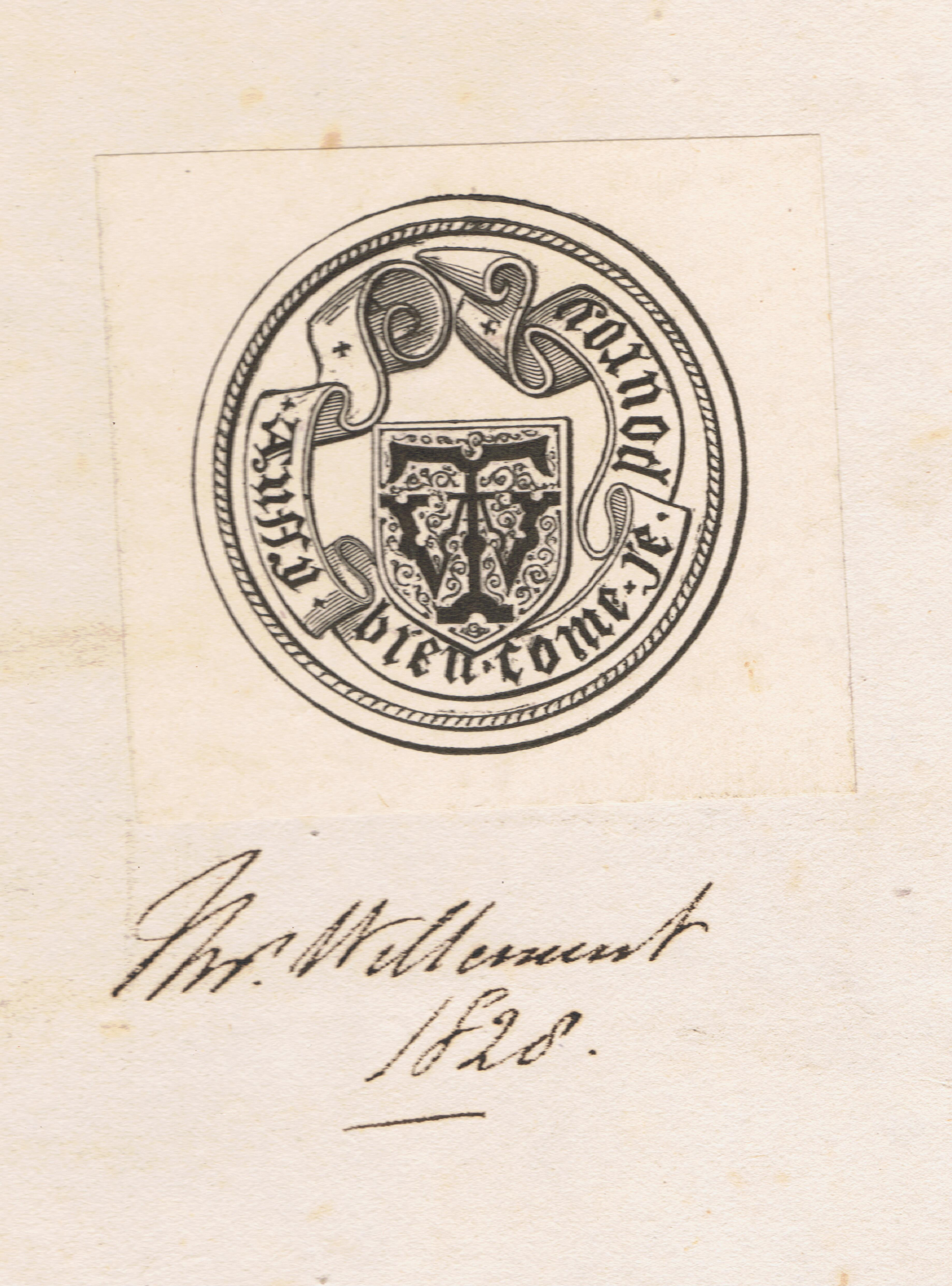
Willement's bookplate in a copy of Remarks on the Seals Attached to the Letters from the Barons of England to Pope Boniface the Eighth in the Year 1301, Respecting the Sovereignty of Scotland, by Nicholas Harris Nicolas, London, 1826

Willement, Thomas (1821). Regal Heraldry: the Armorial Insignia of the Kings and Queens of England, from Coeval Authorities. London: Thomas Willement.

Willement, Thomas (1827). Heraldic Notices of Canterbury Cathedral; with Genealogical and Topographical Notes. To Which is Added a Chronological List of the Archbishops of Canterbury, with the Blazon of their Respective Arms. London: Harding, Lepard and Co.

Willement, Thomas (1829). Fac Simile of a Contemporary Roll, with the Names and the Arms of the Sovereign, and of the Spiritual and Temporal Peers who sat in the Parliament held at Westminster AD 1515.

Willement, Thomas (1834). A Roll of Arms of the Reign of Richard the Second. London: William Pickering.

Willement, Thomas (1840). A Concise Account of the Principal Works in Stained Glass that have been Executed by Thomas Willement. Thomas Willement.

Willement, Thomas (1844). An Account of the Restorations of the Collegiate Chapel of St George, Windsor: with some particulars of the heraldic ornaments of that edifice. London: William Pickering.

Willement, Thomas (1862). Historical Sketch of the Parish of Davington in the County of Kent and of the Priory there dedicated to St Mary Magdalene. London: Basil Montagu Pickering.

Willement, Thomas (1865). Heraldic Antiquities: a Collection of Original Drawings of Charges, Arrangements of Early Examples, &c., with Numerous Engravings of Coats of Arms, Fac Similes of Stained Glass, and Tracings of Early Brasses. London: Publisher unknown.

=== As contributor ===
Shaw, Henry; Meyrick, Sir Samuel Rush (1836). Specimens of Ancient Furniture drawn from Existing Authorities. London: William Pickering.

Shaw, Henry (1839). Details of Elizabethan Architecture. London: William Pickering.

de Walden, Lord Howard (1904). Banners Standards and Badges, From a Tudor Manuscript in the College of Arms With an Introduction by Howard De Walden. The de Walden Library. – includes Willement's tracings from 1831

== See also ==
=== Other early 19th century firms ===
- William Wailes
- William Warrington
- Charles Edmund Clutterbuck
- Hardman & Co.
- Augustus Welby Pugin
- William Holland
- Michael O'Connor

=== Context ===
- British and Irish stained glass (1811–1918)
- Gothic Revival architecture
- Poor Man's Bible
- Edward Jesse
- Edward Blore
- Anthony Salvin

== Notes and references ==
=== Sources ===
Brown, Sarah (2006). "So Perfectly Satisfactory: The Stained Glass of Thomas Willement". A History of the Stained Glass of St George's Chapel, Windsor Castle. Historical Monographs Relating to St George's Chapel. 18. Windsor: 109–145. ISBN 0-9539676-3-8.

Brown, Sarah (2020). "Medieval Stained Glass and the Victorian Restorer". Interdisciplinary Studies in the Long Nineteenth Century. 2020 (30): 1–26. doi:10.16995/ntn.2901. ISSN 1755-1560.

Cheshire, Jim (2004). Stained glass and the Victorian Gothic Revival. Manchester: Manchester University Press. ISBN 0-7190-6346-9.

Harrison, Martin (1980). Victorian Stained Glass. London: Barrie & Jenkins. ISBN 0214206890.

Kirby, H.T. (1946). "Thomas Willement, An Heraldic Glass-Painter's Note Book". Journal of the British Society of Master Glass-Painters. 9 (4): 127–131.

Shepherd, Stanley A. (2008). "Willement, Thomas (1786–1871)". Oxford Dictionary of National Biography (online ed.). Oxford University Press. ISBN 978-0-19-861412-8.

Wilkinson, A.L. (1964). "The works of T. Willement, 1812–1865". Journal of the British Society of Master Glass-Painters. 14 (1): 50–51.

Wainwright, Clive (1972). "Thomas Willement's Stained Glass Windows in the Choir Aisles" (PDF). Annual Report of the Society of the Friends of St George's and Descendants of the Knights of the Garter. 5 (3): 105–118.

Wright, C.E. (Winter 1964–1965). "The Work of Thomas Willement, Stained-Glass Artist, 1812–1865". The British Museum Quarterly. 29 (1/2): 1–5. JSTOR 4422873.
