= Church of St Peter ad Vincula, Hampton Lucy =

Church in Warwickshire, England

St Peter ad Vincula, Hampton Lucy
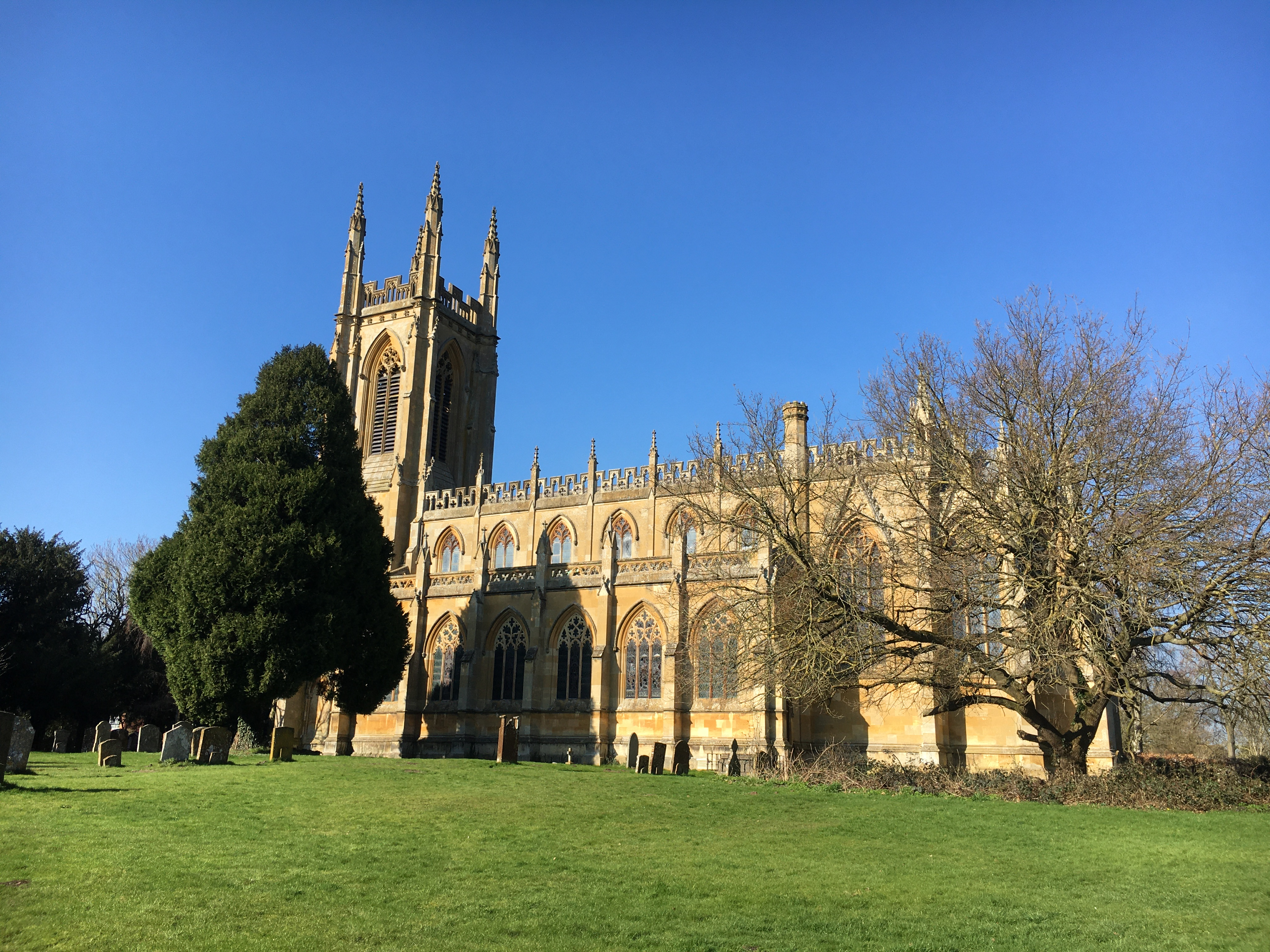
- A view of St Peter ad Vincula Church from the south-east
- St Peter ad Vincula, Hampton Lucy
- 52.21076°N 1.62608°W
- OS grid reference: SP 25647 57013
- Location: Hampton Lucy, Warwickshire
- Country: England
- Language: English
- Denomination: Church of England
- Website: barfordchurches.org.uk

Architecture
- Architect(s): Thomas Rickman and Henry Hutchinson
- Style: Gothic Revival
- Years built: 1822–1826
- Completed: 1826

Administration
- Diocese: Diocese of Coventry
- Archdeaconry: Warwick
- Deanery: Fosse
- Benefice: Hampton Lucy with Charlecote and Loxley
- Parish: Hampton Lucy

Clergy
- Bishop: The Rt Rvd Dr Christopher Cocksworth
- Rector: The Revd Andy Larkin

Listed Building – Grade I
- Official name: Church of St Peter ad Vincula
- Designated: 5 April 1967
- Reference no.: 1382119

St Peter ad Vincula is the Grade I listed Church of England parish church of Hampton Lucy, Warwickshire and is part of the Barford Group of Churches. It was built in the 1820s on the site of a demolished medieval church.

== History ==
The medieval church of St Peter originally stood "not exactly on the same site" as the present church. It was demolished in 1822 when the Lucy family of Charlecote Park employed Thomas Rickman and Henry Hutchinson to design and build a new parish church in the Gothic Revival style. The result is described as "one of the best examples of Victorian Gothic style in Warwickshire" and the "magnum opus" of Rickman and Hutchinson.

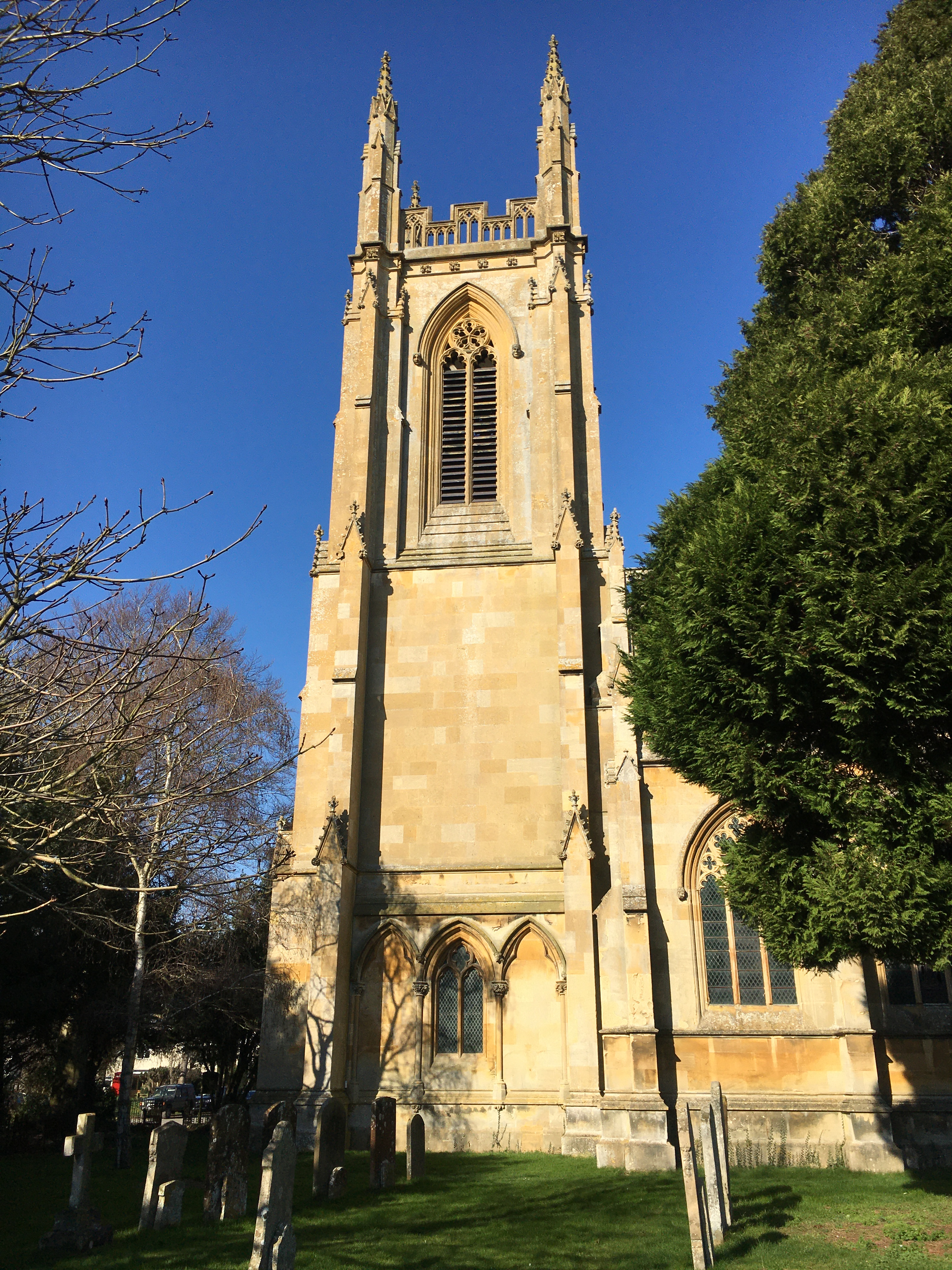
The south elevation of the tower, showing pierced crenellations

The first phase of construction consisted of the ashlared limestone nave and tower, designed by Hutchinson and Rickman respectively. The nave consists of six bays with a north and south aisle. The external walls sit on a moulded plinth and the window hoods, parapet and gables are richly carved. The tower has three stages, terminating in octagonal pinnacles and a pierced, crenellated parapet. In 1858 Sir George Gilbert Scott was employed to add a chancel and north porch, both of which are richly decorated in the Gothic Revival style. A statue of St Peter in chains sits over the north porch along with the Lucy arms.

The east window, depicting the life of St Peter, was restored after it was damaged when an American aircraft crashed nearby during the Second World War. The building was Grade I listed on 5 April 1967 as a "very good example of C19 church architecture". The only remaining fabric of the medieval church are two groups of tiles in the floor of the south aisle, showing heraldic symbols and designs of foliage.

== Bells ==
Today there is only one bell in the tower, cast by Thomas Mears in 1826. It was intended to be the tenor of a ring of eight, but the other bells and framework were never added. There was a ring of five in the tower of the original medieval church, cast by Richard Keene of Woodstock in 1672–1673, which is now classed as a "lost ring". It was probably last rung in 1822 before the old church was demolished; the tenor weighed about 8cwt.

== See also ==
- Holy Trinity Church, Coventry – nearby medieval church, tower recased by Thomas Rickman in 1826
