= Hampton Lucy =

- Village
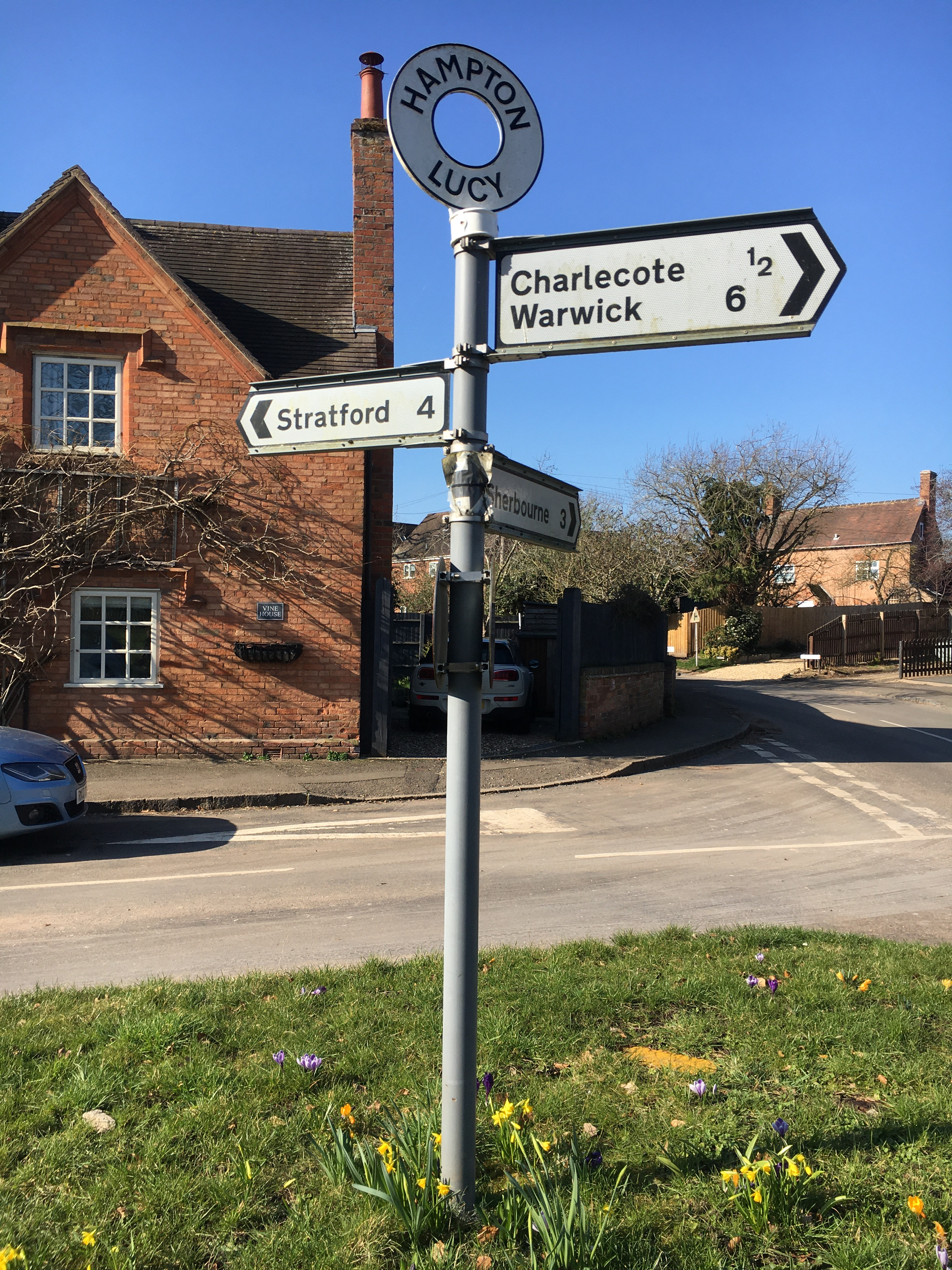
- A signpost in the centre of Hampton Lucy
- Interactive map of Hampton Lucy
- Coordinates: 52.21189°N 1.62611°W
- Country: United Kingdom
- County: Warwickshire

Population (2011)
  - Total: 566
- Postcode: CV35
- Website: hamptonlucy.wordpress.com

Hampton Lucy is a village and civil parish on the River Avon, 4 miles (6.4 km) northeast of Stratford-upon-Avon in Warwickshire England. The population of the civil parish as taken at the 2011 census was 566.

== History ==
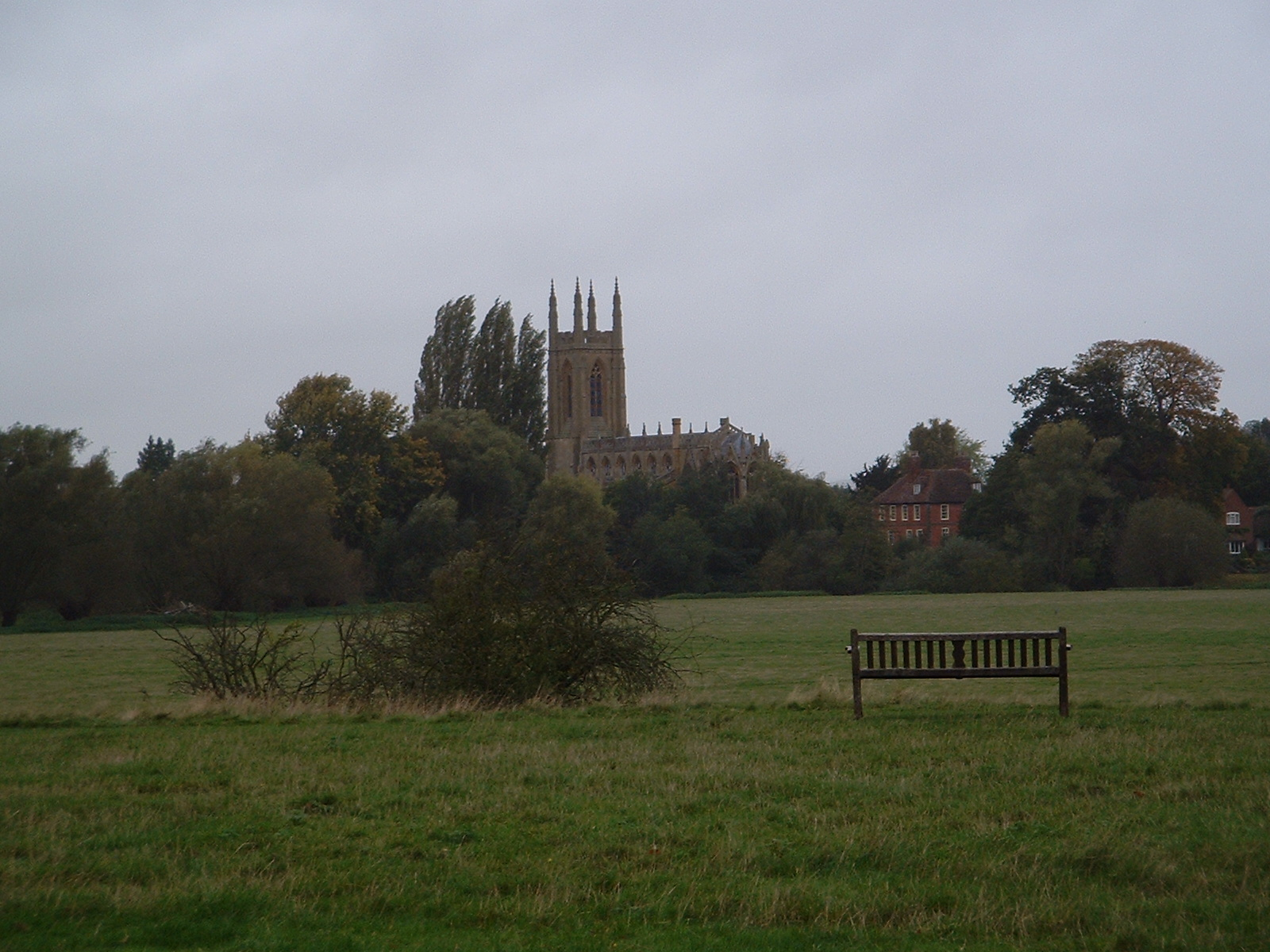
Hampton Lucy from Charlecote Park, dominated by the St Peter ad Vincula parish church

The grammar school at Hampton Lucy was founded and endowed by the Rev. Richard Hill, curate of Hampton Lucy, in the 11th year of the reign of Charles I of England. In 1867, the school had two departments; the upper department had some boarding school students who were each charged 8 pounds, 8 shillings per year. The school closed and was replaced by the Hampton Lucy Grammar School Foundation, which is a charity providing educational grants to children and young persons residing in the parishes of Hampton Lucy, Charlecote, Wasperton or Alveston.

St Peter ad Vincula Church, Hampton Lucy is a Grade I listed building. Charlecote Mill, a Grade II* listed water mill, is nearby.

Notable people associated with the village are Charles Maries, the Victorian botanist who was born and educated at Hampton Lucy, Sir Ian Wilmut OBE, the embryologist, who was born in Hampton Lucy on 7 July 1944, and Rev. Canon Osbert Mordaunt, a first-class cricketer who for twenty years was proprietor of the village public house and rector from 1874 to 1922, who died in October 1923.
