= Arden (name) =

Arden is a unisex given name and an English surname of locational origin. It is derived from three places thus called in the United Kingdom: in Yorkshire North Riding, Cheshire, or the Forest of Arden in Warwickshire. This last Arden family from Warwickshire is one of only three that can trace their ancestry back to before 1066.

== Given name ==
=== People ===
- Arden L. Bement Jr. (born 1932), American engineer and scientist
- Arden Cho (born 1985), American actress, singer, and model
- Arden Eddie (born 1947), Canadian baseball player, team owner, and manager
- Arden Hayes (born 2008), American child prodigy
- Arden Haynes, Canadian businessman
- Arden Hilliard (1904–1976), member of the Hypocrites' Club at Oxford University
- Arden Jones (born 2001), Californian rapper
- Arden Key (born 1996), American football player
- Arden Maddison (1900–1987), English footballer
- Arden Mounts, former NASCAR Cup Series driver
- Arden Myrin (born 1973), American actress and comedian
- Arden Pala (born 2009), American philanthropist
- Arden Rose (born 1995), actress, author, and internet personality
- Arden "Freddie" Sessler (1923–2000), brother of Siegi Sessler
- Arden Shillingford (1936–2019), diplomat
- Arden R. Smith (born 1966), member of the Elvish Linguistic Fellowship

=== Fictional characters ===
- Arden Lyn, a human female assassin from the video game Star Wars: Masters of Teräs Käsi
- Arden, an armor knight from the Fire Emblem series of games

== Surname ==
=== People ===
- Alice Arden (1516–1551), English murderer, burnt at the stake.
- Annabel Arden (born 1959), British actress, theatre and opera director
- Bruce Arden (1927–2021), American computer scientist
- Cecil Arden (1894–1989), American opera singer
- David M. Arden (born 1949), American classical pianist
- Don Arden (1926–2007), English music manager, agent, and businessman
- Donn Arden (1916 or 1917–1994), American choreographer
- Edward Arden (c. 1542–1583) head of the Arden family, executed as a Catholic martyr.
- Edwin Hunter Pendleton Arden (1864–1918), American actor, theatre manager, and playwright
- Elizabeth Arden (1878–1966), American businesswoman, the founder of a cosmetics company of the same name
- Eve Arden (1908–1990), American actress
- Jane Arden (disambiguation), several people
- Jann Arden (born 1962), Canadian singer/songwriter
- John Arden (1930–2012), English playwright
- Mark Arden (born 1956), British comedian and actor
- Mary Arden (c. 1537 – 1608), mother of William Shakespeare
- Mary Arden (actress) (1933–2014), US actress
- Mary Arden (judge) (born 1947), British judge
- Michael Arden (born 1982), American stage actor, singer, and composer
- Richard Pepper Arden, 1st Baron Alvanley (1744–1804) British barrister and Whig politician
- Roy Arden (born 1957), Canadian photographer
- Thomas Arden (1508–1550) Mayor of Faversham, murdered by his wife Alice and her lover Richard Moseby
- Tom Arden (1961–2015), Australian author
- Toni Arden (1924–2012), American singer
- William Arden, pseudonym of the American author Dennis Lynds (1924–2005)

=== Fictional characters ===
- Dale Arden, a character in Flash Gordon
- the title character of Enoch Arden, a poem by Alfred Lord Tennyson
- Jane Arden (comics), a character from the eponymous syndicated newspaper comic strip
- Thomas Arden, the title character of Arden of Faversham, a 16th-century English play, and Arden Must Die, a 1967 opera

== See also ==
- Lady Arden
- Ardyn Izunia, the main antagonist of the video game, Final Fantasy XV
