= 1551 =

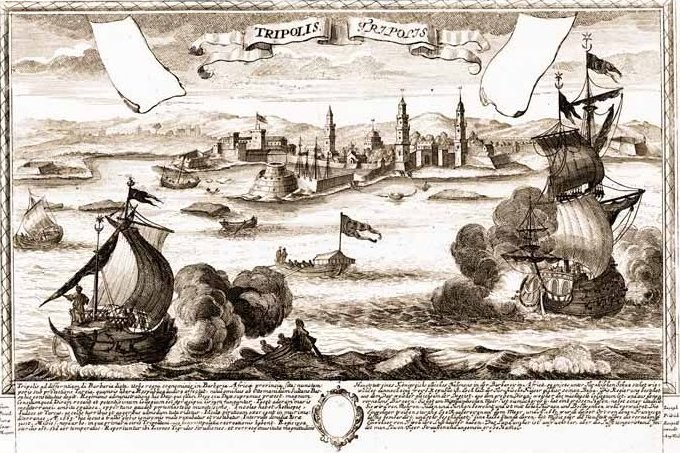
August 15: The Siege of Tripoli ends with Ottoman conquest of North Africa

Year 1551 (MDLI) was a common year starting on Thursday of the Julian calendar.

== Events ==
=== January–March ===
- January 4 – Luca Spinola is elected to a two-year term as the new Doge of the Republic of Genoa, succeeding Gaspare Grimaldi Bracelli.
- January 11 (5th waxing of Tabodwe 912 ME) – King Bayinnaung of Burma is successful in capturing his ancestral city of Toungoo from his rebellious half-brother Minkhaung II, and sets about to make Toungoo the capital for the first time since 1539. Minkhaung is forgiven by King Bayinnaung rather than being executed, and assists in the King's campaign to capture the neighboring Kingdom of Prome.
- January– Macarius, Metropolitan of Moscow, and Tsar Ivan IV of Russia preside over the reforming Stoglavy Synod ("Hundred-Chapter") church council. A calendar of the saints and an ecclesiastical law code (Stoglav) are introduced.
- February 14 – Alice Arden and her lover, Richard Mosbey, carry out the murder-for-hire of her husband, Thomas Arden of Faversham with the assistance of a highwayman known as "Black Will", two of Arden’s domestic servants (Michael Saunderson and Elizabeth Stafford) and Mosbye's sister (Cicely Pounder). The body is carried outside, and Thomas is reported as missing, but a discovery is made that the murder was committed inside the house. The conspirators are later executed.
- February 23– At the Kremlin in Moscow, Tsar Ivan IV and the Metropolitan Macarius, present the proposed code of laws, drafted by the Stoglavy Synod, to the clergy, nobility and principal Russian citizens for their approval.
- March 27 – French mechanical engineer Aubin Olivier becomes the director of the new Royal Mint, the Moulin des Etuves on the Île de la Cité in Paris after having learned the technique of producing uniform milled coinage during a sabbatical in Germany.

=== April–June ===
- April 4 – Ferdinand I, Holy Roman Emperor, issues an edict to reduce tensions among the three major ethnic groups in the Kingdom of Hungary, with an administration to have equal representation of for ethnic Hungarians, Slovaks and Germans.
- May 1 – The Council of Trent reconvenes by order of Pope Julius III after having been adjourned on September 17, 1549.
- May 12 – The National University of San Marcos is founded in Lima in the Viceroyalty of Peru, being the first officially established university in the Americas.
- May 27 – Italian War of 1551–1559: A defensive alliance, placing the Duchy of Parma and Piacenza under the protection of France, is signed between representatives of King Henry II of France and Ottavio Farnese, Duke of Parma, placing Parma under French protection.
- May 30 – Ilie II Rareș, Ruler of Moldavia since 1546, is forced by the Ottoman Empire to abdicate the throne.
- June 11 – With the approval of the Ottoman Sultan Suleiman the Magnificent, Prince Ilie's brother Ștefan VI Rareș becomes the new Prince of Moldavia.
- June 27 – The Edict of Châteaubriant is promulgated in France by King Henri II, providing for an increasingly severe series of measures in the Roman Catholic Kingdom to be taken against Protestants, considered to be heretics.

=== July–September ===
- July 7 – The fifth, and final outbreak of sweating sickness in England reaches London, as documented by Henry Machyn in his diary, and continues until July 19. Machyn notes that "ther ded from the vii day of July unto the xix ded of the swett in London of all dyssesus viij/c, iij/xx and xij and no more in alle, and so the chanseller is sertefiyd." ("There died from the 7th day of July unto the 19th dead of the sweat in London of all diseases 8 hundred, 3 score and 12 [i.e., 872], and no more in all, and so the Chancellor is certified.") John Caius of Shrewsbury writes the first full contemporary account of the symptoms of the disease.
- July 12 – The regency over the Kingdom of Spain by Archduchess Maria and her husband, Archduke Maximilian of Austria, ends after almost three years when Maria's brother Crown Prince Philip returns to Madrid. Philip resumes his role as regent for King Charles I, the father of both Maria and Philip; Maria and Maximilian had served during the absence of both the King and the Crown Prince starting on October 1, 1548.
- July 18 – Invasion of Gozo: Ottoman Turks and Barbary pirates invade the Mediterranean island of Gozo (now part of Malta), and enslave almost all of its 6,000 inhabitants.
- July 19 – The Treaty of Weissenburg goes into effect as John Sigismund Zápolya, King of Hungary since 1540, abdicates in favor of Archduke Ferdinand of Austria. In addition, the independent Kingdom of Transylvania, ruled by Isabella Jagiellon, is ceded to the Kingdom of Hungary as part of peace with Ferdinand.
- July 30 – With the surrender of the island of Gozo, the Ottoman place 6,000 survivors on ships and transporting them to Tarhuna Wa Msalata (in modern-day Libya), where they are sold into slavery. The only natives left on the island are 300 persons who escaped the citadel and 41 elderly residents.
- August 15 – The Siege of Tripoli ends, with the Knights of Malta surrendering Tripoli to the Ottoman Empire.
- August 30 (1st waxing of Thadingyut 913 ME)– King Bayinnaung of Burma conquers the rebellious Kingdom of Prome (with a capital at Pyay) and kills the rebel Thado Thu, a former servant who had proclaimed himself as King Thado Dhamma Yaza after the 1550 assassination of King Tabinshwehti.
- September 21 – The Royal and Pontifical University of Mexico is founded in Mexico City (Mexico), being the second officially established university in the Americas.
- September 30 – (1st day of 9th month of Tenbun 21) Tainei-ji incident: A coup in Yamaguchi, by the military establishment of the Ōuchi clan, forces their lord Ōuchi Yoshitaka to commit suicide, and the city is burned.

=== October–December ===
- October 11 – John Dudley, Earl of Warwick, de facto Lord Protector of the Kingdom of England, is created Duke of Northumberland.
- November 20 – The Office of Cardinal Secretary of State, the second highest position in the Roman Catholic Church after the Pope, is created to temporarily fill the vacancy between the death of one Pontiff and the election of another. Cardinal Girolamo Dandini is appointed by Pope Julius III to serve as the first Secretary of State.
- December 16 – George Martinuzzi, the Hungarian Archbishop of Esztergom and the Governor of Transylvania, is assassinated by Marco Aurelio Ferrari on orders of Ferdinand, King of Hungary. Martinuzzi had been suspected of treason after attempting to negotiate a separate peace treaty with the Ottoman Empire.

=== Date unknown ===
- Qizilbash forces under the command of Tahmasp I raid and destroy the cave monastery of Vardzia in Georgia.
- In Henan province, China, during the Ming dynasty, a severe frost in the spring destroys the winter wheat crop. Torrential rains in mid summer cause massive flooding of farmland and villages (by some accounts submerged in a metre of water). In the fall, a large tornado demolishes houses and flattens much of the buckwheat in the fields. Famine victims either flee, starve, or resort to cannibalism. This follows a series of natural disasters in Henan in the years 1528, 1531, 1539, and 1545.
- In Slovakia, Guta (modern-day Kolárovo) receives town status.
- Portugal founds a sugar colony at Bahia.
- Juan de Betanzos begins to write his Narrative of the Incas.
- The new edition of the Genevan psalter, Pseaumes octantetrois de David, is published, with Louis Bourgeois as supervising composer, including the first publication of the hymn tune known as the Old 100th.

== Births ==
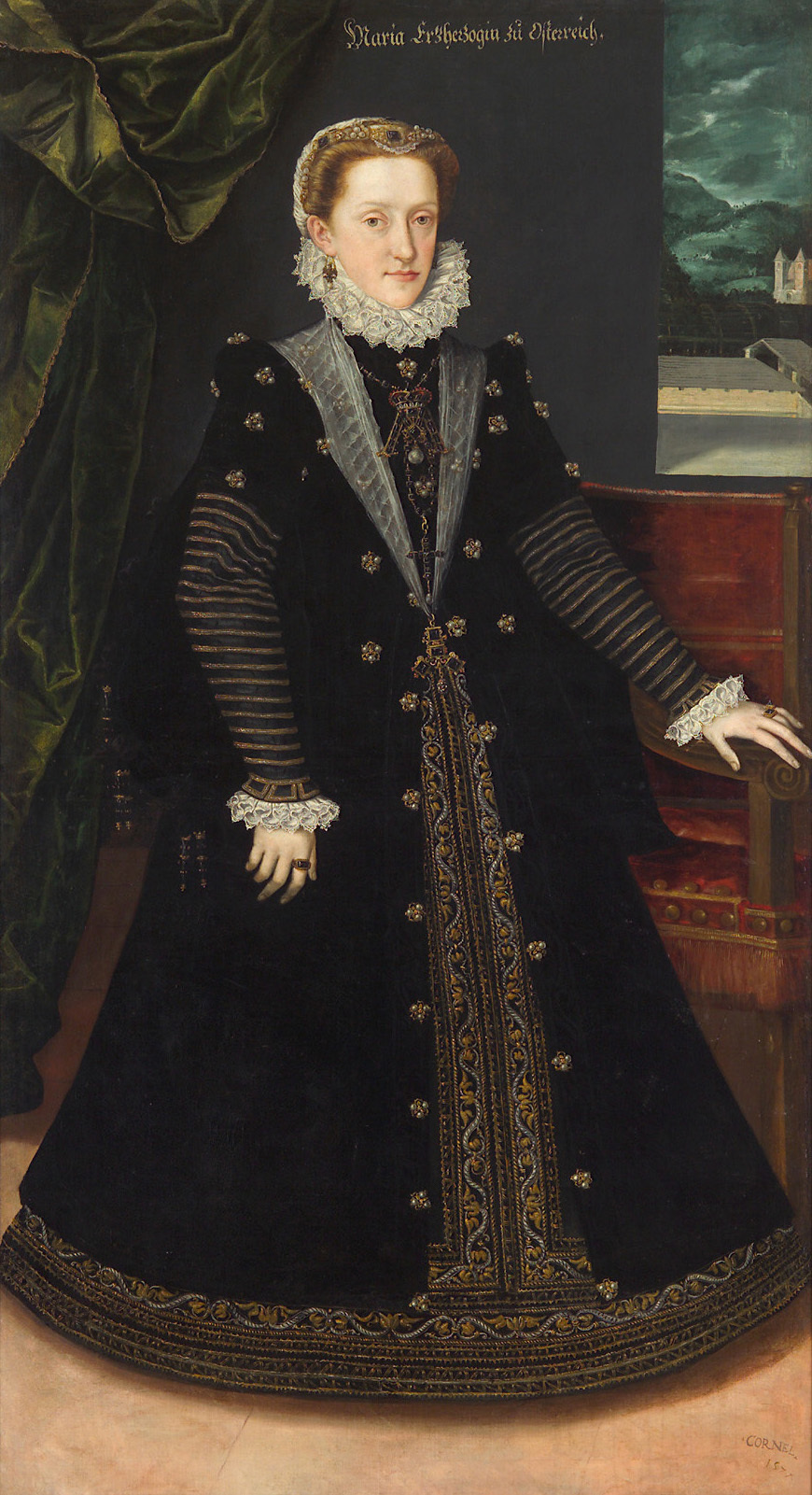
Maria Anna of Bavaria

- January 5 – Jean Chapeauville, Belgian theologian and historian (d. 1617)
- January 14 – Abu'l-Fazl ibn Mubarak, Grand vizier of the Mughal emperor Akbar (d. 1602)
- January 26 – Robert Dormer, 1st Baron Dormer, English politician (d. 1616)
- February 2 – Nicolaus Reimers, German astronomer (d. 1600)
- March 9 – Alessandro Alberti, Italian painter (d. 1596)
- March 21 – Maria Anna of Bavaria (d. 1608)
- March 30 – Salomon Schweigger, German theologian (d. 1622)
- April 9 – Peter Monau, German physician (d. 1588)
- April 30 – Jacopo da Empoli, Italian painter (d. 1640)
- May 2 – William Camden, English historian (d. 1623)
- May 8 – Thomas Drury, English government informer and swindler (d. 1603)
- May 17 – Martin Delrio, Flemish theologian and occultist (d. 1608)
- September 19 – King Henry III of France (d. 1589)
- October 4 – Philip VI, Count of Waldeck (1567–1579) (d. 1579)
- October 8 – Giulio Caccini, Italian composer (d. 1618)
- October 26 – Charlotte de Sauve, French courtesan (d. 1617)
- November 11 – Giovanni I Cornaro, Doge of Venice (d. 1629)
- date unknown
  - Bhai Gurdas – original scribe of Guru Granth Sahib
  - George Tuchet, 1st Earl of Castlehaven (d. 1617)
  - Fausto Veranzio, Dalmatian/Croatian polymath, bishop, humanist (d. 1617)
  - Job of Pochayiv, Ukrainian Christian Orthodox Saint (d. 1651)
- probable
  - Patrick Galloway, Moderator of the General Assembly of the Church of Scotland (d. c.1626)
  - Boris Godunov, Tsar of Russia (d. 1605)
  - Stanisław Stadnicki, Polish nobleman (d. 1610)

== Deaths ==
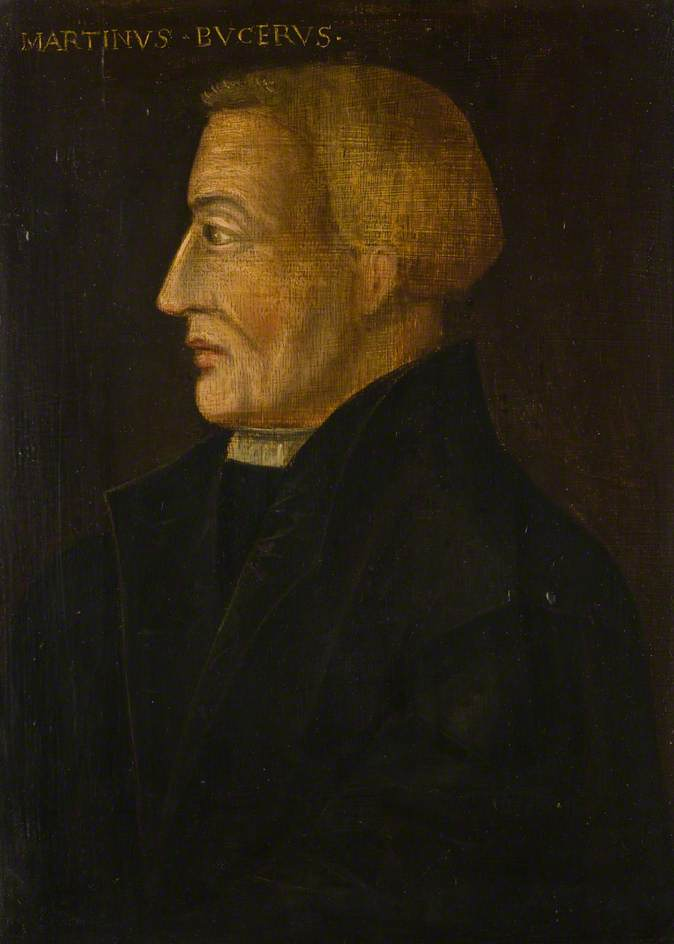
Martin Bucer

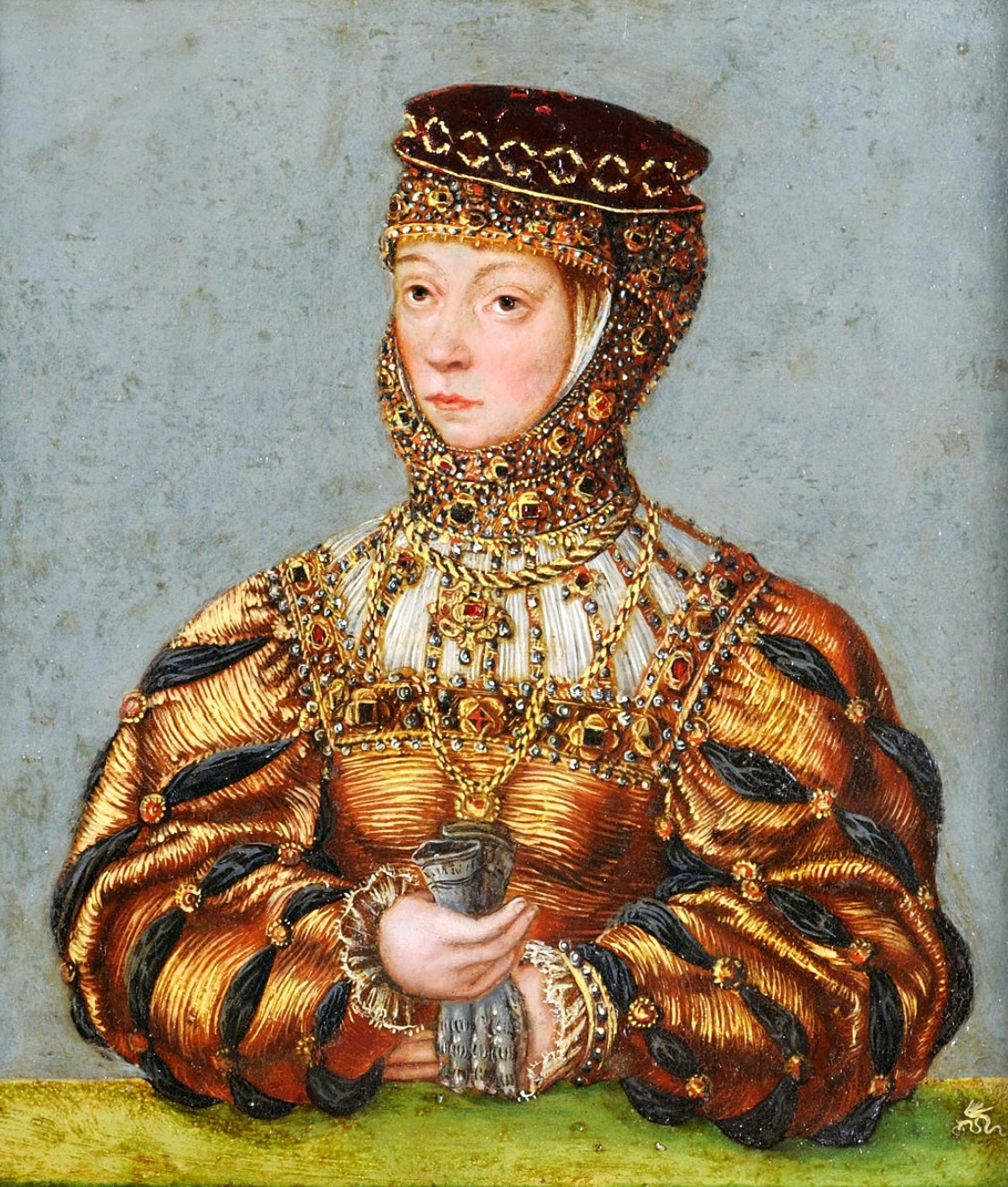
Barbara Radziwiłł

- February 4 – John V, Prince of Anhalt-Zerbst, Prince of Anahlt-Dessau (1516–1544) and Anhalt-Zerbst (1544–1551) (b. 1504)
- February 28 – Martin Bucer, German Protestant reformer (b. 1491)
- April 6 – Joachim Vadian, Swiss humanist (b. 1484)
- April 8 – Oda Nobuhide, Japanese warlord (b. 1510)
- May 8 – Barbara Radziwiłł, queen of Sigismund II of Poland (b. 1523)
- May 17 – Shin Saimdang, Korean artist, calligrapher and writer (b. 1504)
- May 18 – Domenico di Pace Beccafumi, Italian painter (b. 1486)
- June 24 – Charles II de Croÿ, Belgian duke (b. 1522)
- July – Adriaen Isenbrandt, Flemish painter (b. 1490)
- July 13 – John Wallop, English soldier and diplomat (b. 1490)
- July 14 – Henry Brandon, 2nd Duke of Suffolk (b. 1535)
- August 8 – Fray Tomás de Berlanga, Bishop of Panama (b. 1487)
- August 12 – Paul Speratus, German Lutheran (b. 1484)
- August 26 – Margaret Leijonhufvud, queen of Gustav I of Sweden (b. 1516)
- September 30 – Ōuchi Yoshitaka, Japanese warlord (b. 1507)
- November 20 – Hindal Mirza, Mughal Empire emperor (b. 1519)
- date unknown
  - Sagara Taketō, Japanese samurai (b. 1498)
  - Helena Ungler, Polish printer
  - Alice Arden, English murderer (b. 1516; executed by burning)
