= List of mayors of Faversham =

The following were among the mayors of Faversham, Kent, England:

== Pre 21st Century ==
- 1438 Simonis Orwell
- 1465 Willelmus Norton
- 1480 Edward Thomasson [Thompson]
- 1535 Richard Colwell
- 1550: Thomas Arden, who was murdered by his wife, Alice Arden, and her lover, the subject of the play Arden of Faversham
- 1580: Richard Tylman, mayor, became Faversham's leading corn, wheat and malt exporter to London.
- 1588 John Castlock Sr
- 1598 Anthony Deale
- 1603 John Castlock Sr
- 1605 John Haywarde
- 1612 John Caslocke Jr
- 1619 John Besbeech
- 1621 Thomas Napleton
- 1624 Samuel Hayward
- 1628 John Caslocke Jr
- 1629 John Besbeech
- 1650 John Shevren (Sherren)
- 1650/1651 William Hills (died in office 26 March 1651)
- 1655 John Shevren (Sherren)
- 1657 Edward Spillett
- 1674 Marke Trouts
- 1677 Stephen Blanket
- 1683 Stephen Blanket
- 1691 William Day
- 1693 Isaac Terry
- 1697 Thomas Gibbs
- 1700 John Bateman
- 1703 Isaac Terry
- 1704 Thomas Gibbs
- 1706 John Seere
- 1707 John Bateman
- 1708 Richard Marsh, traditionally regarded as the founder of Shepherd Neame Brewery
- 1710 Thomas Gibbs
- 1712 Isaac Terry
- 1713 Michael Jones
- 1715 Thomas Gibbs
- 1716 John Seere
- 1719 John Bateman
- 1723 Isaac Jones (son of Mayor Michael Jones)
- 1724 John Bateman (died in office on 2 June 1725)
- 1726 John Seere
- 1732 John Watson
- 1735 Isaac Jones
- 1737 John Seere
- 1739 John Watson
- 1743 James Tappenden
- 1745 Isaac Jones
- 1749 Edward Jacob
- 1754 Edward Jacob
- 1765 Edward Jacob
- 1775 Edward Jacob
- 1807 Byng Baker (former grocer and tallow-chandler, declared bankrupt 1781)
- 1808 Francis Perkins
- 1857 R.J. Hilton
- 1865 J.H. Fielding
- 1866 J.A. Anderson
- 1870 J.H. Fielding
- 1872 R. Watson-Smith
- 1873 L. Shrubsole
- 1876 J.A. Anderson
- 1877 L. Shrubsole
- 1878 L. Shrubsole
- 1880 L. Shrubsole
- 1881 E. Smith
- 1882 J.A. Anderson
- 1884 L. Shrubsole
- 1885 L. Shrubsole
- 1889 H.R. Child
- 1891 E. Holmes
- 1892 E. Smith
- 1899: Charles Cremer, brick manufacturer
- 1901–02: Councillor F. Austin, a representative of the Cinque Ports at the Coronation of King Edward VII and Queen Alexandra.
- 1902–03: Jabez Smith
- 1907–09: Charles Cremer
- 1948–50: Harry Knowles, greengrocer, awarded honorary freedom of Faversham.
- 1989–1991: Peter Salmon
- 1991–1992: Bryan Mulhern (1952–2020)
- 1993–1995: Brian Tovey
- 1995–1996: Michael Scott Henderson
- 1996–1998: Kate Lee
- 1998–1999: Chris Perkin
- 1999–2000: Patrick Mulcahy

== 21st Century ==
- 2000–01: Chris Perkin (born c.1955)
- 2001–03: Thomas "Tom" Gates
- 2003–05: Cynthia "Cindy" Davis
- 2005–06: Michael Gates
- 2006–08: Trevor Fentiman
- 2008–10: Ted Wilcox
- 2010–12: Anita Walker
- 2012–14: David Simmons
- 2014–16: Nigel Kay
- 2016–18: Shiel Campbell
- 2018–19: Trevor Abram
- 2019–2022: Alison Reynolds
- 2022–2024 Trevor Martin (born c.1963) a representative of the Cinque Ports at the Coronation of King Charles III.
- 2024–present Josh Rowlands
