= The complaint and lamentation of Mistresse Arden of Feversham in Kent =

17th-century English broadside ballad

The complaint and lamentation of Mistress Arden of Feversham in Kent is a 17th-century English broadside ballad that details the murder of Thomas Arden by his wife Alice, her lover Moseby, and several others in 1551 in the town of Faversham, Kent. The ballad's full title is "The complaint and lamentation of Mistresse Arden of / Feversham in Kent, who for the loue of one Mosbie, hired certaine Ruffians / and Villaines most cruelly to murder her Husband; with the fatall end of her and her / Associats." It was entered into the Stationers' Register on July 8, 1663. The ballad is framed as the scaffold confession of Alice Arden, related in the moments before her execution by burning at the stake. The events in the ballad closely parallel both the source text for the event, Raphael Holinshed's Chronicles of England, Scotland, and Ireland, and the anonymous 16th-century English play Arden of Faversham. The British Library holds the only existing copy of the ballad in their Roxburghe collection.

== Synopsis ==
The ballad opens with the lamentation of the guilty Alice Arden: "AY me, vile wretch, that ever I was borne, / Making my selfe unto the world a scorne: / And to my friends and kindred all a shame, / Blotting their blood by my unhappy name." She tells the audience that she marries Arden, a "Gentleman of wealth and fame," and lives happily with him until she is seduced by a man named Mosby. When Arden becomes jealous of Alice and Mosby's affair, the two lovers decide to do away with Arden. They first attempt to murder him by putting poison, obtained from a painter who is in love with Mosby's sister Susan, in Arden's broth; Arden, however, dislikes the taste of the poisoned broth and refuses to eat it, evading death and incurring his wife's wrath. As he leaves Faversham for London, Alice asks Arden's servant, Michael, to help her kill him, and promises Michael the hand of Susan Mosby in return. Doubting that Michael will follow through with his promise, Alice also engages a neighbor, Greene, who hates Arden, and convinces him to kill Arden to save Alice from her husband's abuse. She gives Greene some money to hire murderers to kill Arden. Greene, on his way to London, hires two "Villaines," Shakebag and Black Will, to kill Arden.

Shakebag and Black Will wait for Arden outside of St. Paul's Cathedral, where he is doing business, but the second attempt on Arden's life is foiled by a prentice who shuts his shop window on Black Will's head. Black Will and Shakebag then corner Michael and tell him to leave his master's doors unlocked so they can kill him that night. Michael does so, but Arden is terrified by nightmares about his own murder, and wakes up to check the doors; finding them unlocked, he scolds Michael and evades the third attempt on his life by locking the doors. Michael tells Black Will and Shakebag that they will have another opportunity the next day on Raymon Down, as Arden is traveling back to Faversham.

On his way home to Faversham, Arden meets Lord Cheiney and his retinue, who requests that Arden have dinner with him that evening; Arden declines in favor of seeing his wife, but promises to come the next day. Arden and Cheiney travel together; Black Will and Shakebag are prevented from murdering Arden (the fourth attempt on his life) by the presence of Cheiney and his train. Alice says that she and Mosby "revell[ed]" while her husband was gone, and she is disappointed that he returns to her, but she pretends otherwise and awaits another opportunity to have him killed. When Black Will reports their failure to Alice, she tells them that Arden will be vulnerable again the next day, on his way to Lord Cheiney's; the fifth attempt on his life fails, however, when a mist appears around the murderers, so thick "[t]hey could not see although they had foure eyes." They return to Alice's house, where she lays the final plot: Arden and Mosby would play at tables, and when Mosby announces, "Now (Master Arden) I have taken ye," Black Will and Shakebag would kill Arden.

Arden returns, and he and Mosby begin to play; at Mosby's signal, Black Will and Shakebag jump out and pull Arden backwards with a towel, stabbing him; Alice and Mosby stab him as well. Then, the murderers take his body to the field behind the Abbey. They are immediately discovered and arrested; the ballad describes the discovery of their crime as divine justice ("For God our secret dealings soone did spy, / And brought to light our shamefull villany").

Shifting the narration away from Alice Arden and to an anonymous narrator, the ballad relates the executions of those involved in the murder of Arden. Alice is burnt at Canterbury. Mosby and his sister Susan are executed at Smithfield. Michael and Bradshaw, a goldsmith who knew of letters passing between the murderers, are hanged in chains at Faversham. The painter who provided Alice with the poison for the broth escaped to an unknown fate. Shakebag was murdered in Southwark. Greene was hanged in Osbridge (presumably Ospringe). Black Will was burnt at Flushing. The ballad ends with a prayer by the narrator to keep all from ill.

== Sources ==
The ballad draws upon two source texts: Holinshed's Chronicles and the anonymous play Arden of Faversham, likely written between 1588 and 1592 and entered into the Stationers' Register in 1592. Holinshed provides the story of Thomas Arden's 1551 murder in great detail, significantly interrupting his relation of the reign of Edward VI to tell the story despite the fact that it "seem[s] to be but a private matter." Although it is a story of local history, Thomas Arden was a landowner and onetime mayor of Faversham, and his story offers a commentary on the redistribution of land during the dissolution of the monasteries begun by Edward VI's father, Henry VIII.

== Form ==
=== Language ===
The ballad is written in 48 quatrains of iambic pentameter, rather than the traditional ballad meter. The rhyme scheme is aabb. Most of the ballad is related from the first-person perspective of Alice Arden herself; this shifts significantly in the last six stanzas, which is told from the perspective of an anonymous narrator and relates the deaths of those accused of murdering Arden.

=== Music ===
The broadsheet dictates that this ballad is to be sung to the tune "Fortune my Foe," a popular tune often used in ballads that lament turns of fate and fortune.

=== Print ===
The ballad is composed of four columns of blackletter type, although the title and certain emphasized words within the body of the ballad are in Roman type. There is one large woodcut image above the first two columns, below the title. This image is significant because it is one of very few images carved for a specific ballad—the image clearly shows the murder of Thomas Arden by his wife and her associates, while Arden and Mosby played backgammon (called "tables" in the ballad). It is an interior scene that depicts six murderers, with their victim in the center. This same image was used for the frontispiece of the 1633 quarto of the play Arden of Faversham.
