= Chris Perkin =

Chris Perkin may refer to:

- Chris Perkin, Mayor of Faversham, Kent, England
- Chris Perkin (writer), who worked with Thom Tuck

== See also ==
- Christopher Perkins (disambiguation)
