= Jane Arden =

Jane Arden may refer to:

- Jane Gardiner (1758–1840), née Arden, British schoolmistress and grammarian.
- Jane Arden (director) (1927–1982), British director and actor
- Jane Arden (actress) (born 1959), British actor
- Jane Arden (comics), a daily newspaper comic strip which ran from 1927 to 1968

== See also ==
- Arden (name)
