= Edward Jacob (antiquary) =

English antiquary, naturalist and mayor

Edward Jacob (1713–1788) was an English antiquary, naturalist and mayor from Kent.

== Life ==
He was the son of Edward Jacob, surgeon of Canterbury, mayor of that city in 1727, who died in 1756. He was apprenticed to his father on a surgical apprenticeship in 1728. On completion of this in 1735 he was made a freeman of the city of Canterbury and moved to Faversham in Kent in that same year, where he practised as a surgeon.

Jacob was an antiquary, bibliophile, scientist, botanist and fossil collector. He wrote a number of papers and books. 1774 saw his Plantae Favershemiensis appear, as well as his History of the Town and Port of Faversham. He also re-published the anonymous 16th century play Arden of Faversham, and was the first person to suggest that Shakespeare had a hand in writing it. He was elected to the Society of Antiquaries in 1755.

He was mayor of Faversham on four occasions, namely, 1749, 1754, 1765 and 1775. His practice must have flourished, for he acquired three estates in Kent.

1. the manor of Nutts in Leysdown in the Isle of Sheppey was bought in 1752,
2. the manor of Cades in Ospringe next Faversham in 1757
3. the manor of Nackington alias Sextries in Canterbury in 1763.

== Family ==
Jacob married twice. His first wife was Margaret Rigden, whom he married on 4 September 1739, she being the daughter of John Rigden of Canterbury. She was baptized on 23 September 1709 and buried on 20 January 1749. Edward married for his second wife Mary Long, the daughter and heiress of Captain Stephen Long of Sandwich. They had eight children, five of whom survived infancy.

His practice in Faversham was continued by his eldest son Edward. He was the ancestor of many noted people that include:

- Brigadier General John Jacob of Jacobabad,
- Major-General Sir George Le Grand Jacob,
- Edgar Jacob, the bishop successively of Newcastle and St Albans,
- Field Marshal Sir Claud Jacob,
- Lt-General Sir Ian Jacob, Director General of the BBC and a member of Churchill's war cabinet,
- Gordon Jacob, the composer,
- Ernest Fraser Jacob, the historian

to name but a few.
