= Christopher Perkins =

Christopher Perkins or Chris Perkins may refer to:

- Christopher Perkins (archer) (born 1992), Canadian archer
- Christopher Perkins (artist) (1891–1968), English painter
- Chris Perkins (footballer) (born 1974), English footballer
- Chris Perkins (game designer) (born 1968), American-Canadian Dungeons & Dragons designer
- Chris Perkins (politician) (born 1954), U.S. Representative for Kentucky
- Christopher Perkins (priest) (1547–1622), English Jesuit priest, politician and diplomat

== See also ==
- Christopher Steele-Perkins (born 1947), British photographer
- Chris Perkin (disambiguation)
