= Arden Must Die =

1967 opera by Alexander Goehr

- Opera by Alexander Goehr
- Other title: Arden muss sterben
- Librettist: Erich Fried
- Language: German, translated to English
- Premiere: 5 March 1967; Hamburg State Opera

Arden Must Die (German: Arden muss sterben) is an opera by Alexander Goehr. It premiered on 5 March 1967 at the Hamburg State Opera, conducted by Charles Mackerras and directed by Egon Monk. It was commissioned by the Hamburg State Opera.

The German libretto was written by Erich Fried, with an English version by Geoffrey Skelton. It tells the story of the murder of Thomas Arden by his wife Alice and her lover Mosbie. The libretto draws on two sixteenth-century accounts of the murder, namely the version by chronicler Raphael Holinshed and the anonymous play Arden of Faversham.

The British première was at Sadler's Wells Theatre, London, on 17 April 1974, conducted by Meredith Davies.
