= Richard Tylman of Faversham =

English food commodity dealer and exporter

Richard Tylman

Mayor of Faversham
- In office 1580–1581
- Monarch: Elizabeth I of England
- Preceded by: Thomas Barminge
- Succeeded by: Edward Harris
- Constituency: Town of Faversham

Personal details
- Born: 1546 Pluckley, Kent, England
- Died: 8 September 1584 (aged 37–38) Faversham, Kent, England
- Spouse: Ellen Cobb (Cobbes)
- Children: Alice, Avie, Margery, Nicholas, Richard, Thomas, William
- Occupation: Food commodity dealer

Richard Tylman of Faversham was an English food commodity dealer and exporter. He served as Mayor of Faversham in 1580 during the reign of Elizabeth I of England, at an ancient sea port established before the Roman conquest.

Around 1580, when Tylman served as Faversham's mayor, England was still underpopulated with millions of acres of land lying in waste or covered by bog. "Roads were worse than the Romans had left them" observed the Kent Archaeological Field School study. The grain harvest was the main source of income, with timber as the essential building material. Most industry was cottage based with spinning, knitting, weaving, tanning, and smithying at the centre of the local economy.

== Life ==
Richard Tylman was born in Pluckley, Kent, England in 1546 to Nicholas Tylman and his wife Mildred. Richard married Ellen, the daughter of Thomas Cobb (Cobbes) of the Cobb Coat of Arms, and had 7 children with her: Alice, Avie, Margery, Nicholas, Richard, Thomas, and William (1562–1614, mayor of Faversham in 1594). Richard Tylman died on 8 September 1584 in Faversham, Kent. His children were bequeathed 20 shillings each at the age of 20< by their maternal grandfather Thomas.

== Business dealings ==
Richard Tylman of Faversham, was a leading corn, wheat and malt exporter to London. His name was sometimes spelled Tillman in official records (used in books) since the spelling of names wasn't fixed, as it is today. Nevertheless, the mayor and grain exporter were one and the same person, identified through his business correspondence with the Lord Treasurer, preserved by the City of London Corporation. In 1580 all corn sold by Faversham dealers to the London merchants came from Richard Tylman, including 17 cargoes of wheat, delivered in 33 ship voyages carrying grain, an average of 64 quarters per voyage. Also in 1580, along with Nicholas Freeman, Tylman exported 745 quarters of malt to the capital.

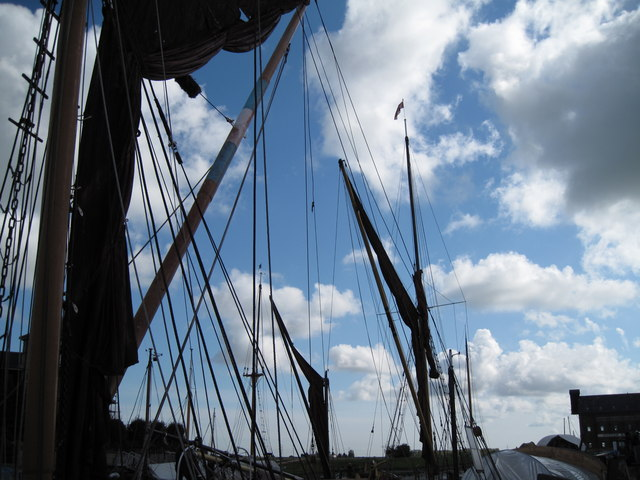
Faversham wharfs today

The prosperous trade with London allowed Tylman (Tillman) to make new acquisitions. In 1581 he bought three houses (messuages) with two gardens, two additional storerooms and one granary, as well as two wharfs in the harbour fitted with a capstan and appurtenances. According to records, Tylman paid one hundred twenty four pounds of silver for his purchases. The valuable surplus grain produced by local farmers used to be delivered to Faversham wharfs in carts, and unloaded at merchants' quays (like the ones bought by Tylman) for export by sea. Sending similar quantities by road was simply not possible.

Already during the reign of Elizabeth I of the Tudor dynasty, England began to experience dramatic shortages of timber. The rising price of wood lead to a greater demand for coal. Meanwhile, the physical distance of timber deliveries steadily grew. Richard Tylman along with all traders of Faversham exported processed timber to London.
