= Tom Arden =

British writer

David Rain
- Born: 2 May 1961; Mount Gambier, South Australia
- Died: 15 December 2015 (aged 54); London, England
- Occupation: Writer
- Writing career
- Pen name: Tom Arden
- Period: 1997–2014
- Genres: Fantasy, Science fiction

David Rain (2 May 1961 – 15 December 2015), known by his pen name Tom Arden, was a British science fiction and fantasy writer. He was born in Australia.

His main work is the five volume Orokon saga, as well as the novels Shadow Black, The Translation of Bastian Test and the Doctor Who novella Nightdreamers.

Arden was born in 1961 and grew up in Mount Gambier, South Australia. He wrote his first unpublished novel, Moon Escape at the age of seven and later studied English at the University of Adelaide, graduating with First Class Honours. Arden completed his PhD thesis on Clarissa, the epic tale by 18th-century novelist Samuel Richardson.

In 1990, he moved to the United Kingdom, living in Northern Ireland and England. He lectured in English at Queen's University Belfast for seven years. Since 2003, he lectured creative writing at Middlesex University, London.

== Death ==
Arden died of cancer on 15 December 2015 in London, England.

== Bibliography ==
=== The Orokon ===
1. The Harlequin's Dance (1997)
2. The King and Queen of Swords (1998)
3. Sultan of the Moon and Stars (1999)
4. Sisterhood of the Blue Storm (2000)
5. Empress of the Endless Dream (2001)

=== Other novels ===
1. Shadow Black (2002) – gothic mystery
2. The Translation of Bastian Test (2005) – science fiction
3. As David Rain: The Heat of the Sun (2012)
4. As David Rain: Volcano Street (2014)

=== Other writings ===
1. Nightdreamers (original novella) based on the television series Doctor Who.
2. Short stories for UK publication Interzone: "The Indigenes" (IZ 136), "The Volvax Immersion" (IZ 143).
3. Articles have been published in the British Fantasy Society magazine Prism.
