= Arden Hayes =

American child prodigy (born 2008)

- Born: January 30, 2008 (age 18)
- Occupation: Child prodigy · student
- Years active: 2013–present
- Known for: Knowledge of American politics and geopolitics
- Television: Jimmy Kimmel Live!

Arden Hayes (born January 30, 2008) is an American former child prodigy from Southern California. He became known at age 5 for his knowledge of American geopolitics, reciting Abraham Lincoln's "Gettysburg Address", and being able to identify the countries of the world and name the capitals of each. In 2019 his name was still used as an example in the discussion about what makes a child a genius.

His interest in American presidents was sparked by Arden's learning that he shares a birthday with former United States President Franklin D. Roosevelt.

On May 4, 2013, Arden was featured in an article and video in the Los Angeles Times. This spurred many additional newspaper articles and blogs and Arden appeared on Jimmy Kimmel Live! on July 2, 2013, to demonstrate his knowledge regarding U.S. presidents. On November 5, 2013, Arden again appeared on Jimmy Kimmel Live!, and displayed his knowledge of the nations of the world and their capitals and rejected a Sony Xperia Tablet Z because he was already planning to get an iPad for Christmas. He appeared on Jimmy Kimmel Live! for the third time on April 2, 2014, and showed his interest and knowledge about chemical elements in the periodic table. He appeared on the show again on November 23, 2015, when he won a shut-out victory against the cast of Star Wars: The Force Awakens in a Star Wars trivia contest.
