= Cecil Arden =

American mezzo-soprano/contralto opera singer (1894–1989)

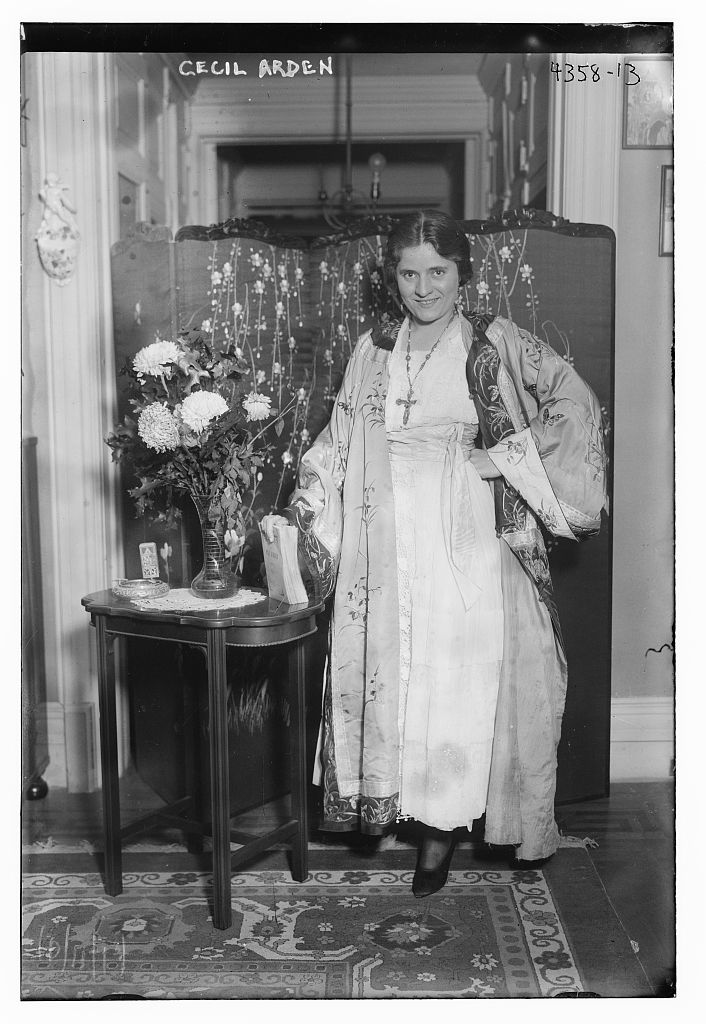
- Arden in 1917
- Born: Cecile Alexia Hart; December 15, 1894; New York City, U.S.
- Died: September 4, 1989 (aged 94); Seattle, Washington ?
- Occupations: Mezzo-soprano and contralto opera singer
- Spouse: Signor Ardito Tivoli

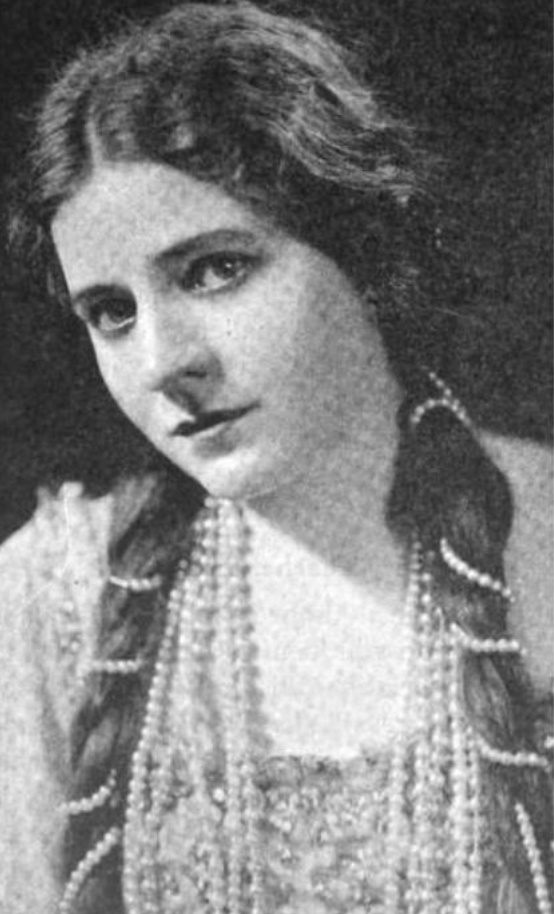
Cecil Arden, from a 1925 publication

Cecil Arden (December 15, 1894 – September 4, 1989) was an American mezzo-soprano and contralto opera singer active over the early decades of the twentieth century.

== Life and career ==
Cecile Alexia Hart was born in New York City to Benjamin and Mildred Hart. Her father was real estate broker originally from Charleston, South Carolina, and her mother a native of Springfield, Illinois.

Little is known of Arden's early life other than that she studied under the Italian Arturo Buzzi-Peccia and that there are photographs of her singing at a patriotic event on the steps of New York’s Federal Hall National Memorial during World War I (possibly after she joined the Metropolitan Opera). In October 1917, she was one of nearly 30 performers slated to appear in Friday Morning Musicals at the New York Biltmore Hotel from November into January, 1918. Arden's debut with the Metropolitan Opera came on January 12, 1918, as Vanard in the American debut of Mascagni's lyric opera Lodoletta with Geraldine Farrar and Enrico Caruso. She remained with the Met for eight seasons singing mainly supporting roles. The remainder of her career would be spent on concert tours in Europe and America before the Great Depression made such enterprises financially risky.

Arden lived with her mother in New York City throughout the war years and later married a Signor Ardito Tivoli and moved to Rome, where she would reside for 15 years. After her husband's death in the late 1960s, she returned to America to live with friends in Wisconsin and later Seattle, Washington.

Arden died on September 4, 1989, probably in Seattle.
