= Thomas Arden =

Mayor of Faversham, Kent, England, and murder victim (1508–1550)

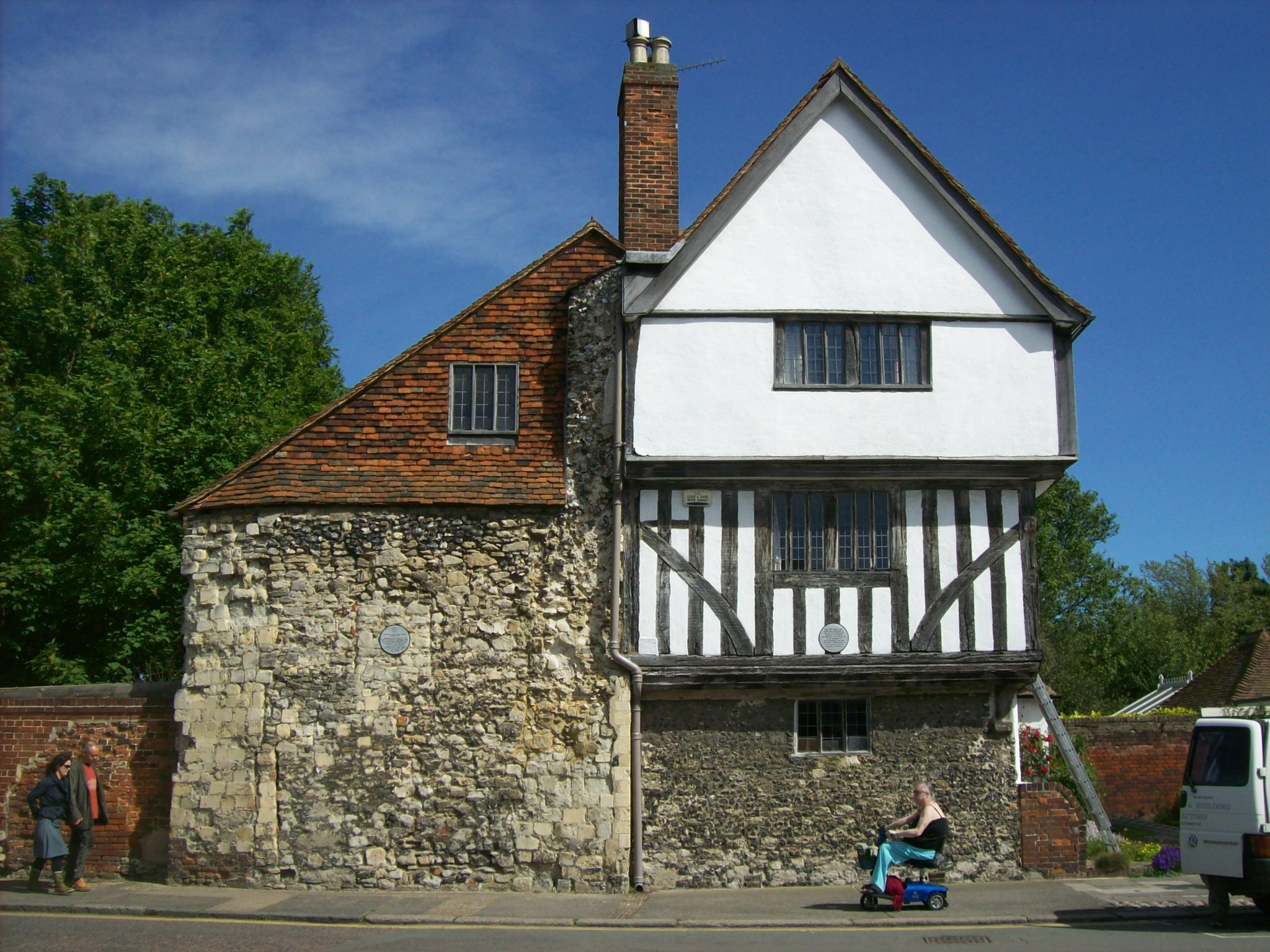
Arden's house on Abbey Street, Faversham is still standing. It was built by Arden in c. 1538–1540 and uses parts of the former abbey gatehouse.

Thomas Arden (1508–1550) was Mayor of Faversham, Kent, England.

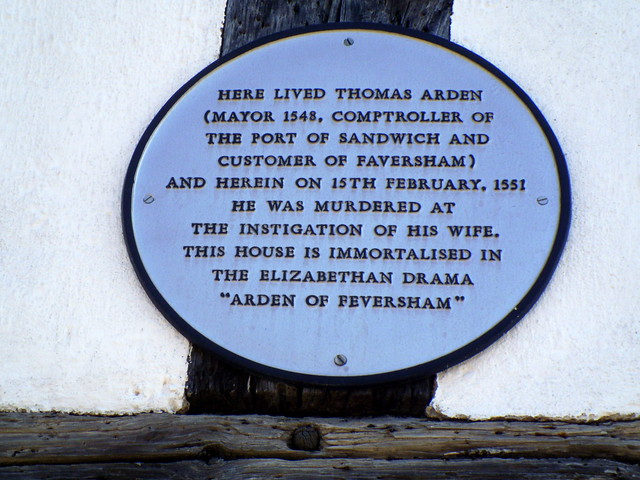
Plaque on the house of Thomas Arden

He was murdered by his wife, Alice, and her lover, Richard Moseby. This would inspire the Elizabethan play, Arden of Faversham, which in turn was the basis of the opera Arden Must Die (1967).

Between 1610 and 1638, a broadside ballad was additionally published about the murder.
