= Alice Arden =

English murderer (c. 1516–1551)

- Born: c. 1516
- Died: 1551 (aged 35); Canterbury, Kent
- Criminal charge: Petty treason (murder of a man by his wife)
- Criminal penalty: Death by burning
- Spouse: Thomas Arden
- Parents: John Brigandine; Alice Squire

Alice Arden (c. 1516–1551) was an English murderer. She was the daughter of John Brigandine and Alice Squire, and step-daughter of Sir Edward North, later Lord North. She conspired to have her husband, Thomas Arden of Faversham, murdered so she could carry on with a long-term affair with a tailor, Richard Moseby. The murder took place on 14 February 1551. She was tried, convicted, and burnt at the stake for her part in the murder.

== Conspirators ==
The murder was described by Raphael Holinshed in his Chronicles and later had entries in both The Newgate Calendar and the Chambers Book of Days. Alice Brigandine married Thomas Arden on an unknown date. They made their home at Faversham Abbey, which had been dissolved in 1536. They had at least one daughter, Margaret, who was born in 1538.

According to these accounts, Alice was "young, tall, and well favoured of shape and countenance". She began an affair with a tailor, Richard Mosbye, and then she plotted to kill her husband. Thomas Arden was a "private gentleman". His rival Mosbye (or "Mosbie") was in the service of Edward North, 1st Baron North, before setting up shop in London. Mosbye frequented the house of the Ardens and the affair was carried on rather openly. Thomas had to turn a blind eye, unwilling to sever relations with Alice's family. In time Alice came to loathe her husband and considered disposing of him. She made an early attempt on his life by poisoning him. She mixed milk and poison within a porringer, serving it to Thomas for breakfast. She had failed to account for the taste of the poison used. Thomas only took "a spoonful or two" before quitting his breakfast and complaining of its quality.

Alice had to find an accomplice for her further efforts. Holinshed simply mentions: "They employed as their confederates one John Green, a Faversham tailor; George Bradshaw, a goldsmith of the same town; and one Black Will, of Calyce (Calais), a murderer, which murderer was privily sent for to Calyce by the earnest sute, appoyntment, and confederate of Alice Arden and Thomas Mosbye." The Newgate Calendar gives a more extensive account. She found her accomplice in the person of Mr Green, a local man who had personal grievances with Thomas Arden. Green had claimed a piece of land on the back side of Faversham Abbey. Arden claimed the vicinity of his residence as part of his own property, successfully wresting control of Green's land. The two men had exchanged blows and threats before. Green still hated his enemy and was willing to work for his murder. Since both were inexperienced in the art of murder, they decided to hire someone else to do the deed, resolving to pay the mercenary ten pounds for the completed murder.

Green was employed by Sir Anthony Agers. Agers had business in London. He was already there for a while before asking Green to join him there. Green was reluctant to travel alone and hired Mr Bradshaw to accompany him. Bradshaw was a local goldsmith and veteran soldier, having served under Sir Richard Cavendish during the Sieges of Boulogne. In their travel they chanced on an old acquaintance of Bradshaw, known as "Black Will". Will was also a veteran soldier but one who had committed "several robberies and horrid murders" in France. Armed "with a sword and buckler", Will was apparently making his living as a highwayman since leaving military service. Green decided he had found his mercenary, hiring Will for the murder.

== Failed attempts ==
Holinshed mentions a number of failed attempts on Thomas's life. "The conspirators watched Master Arden walking in Poule's (St. Paul's Cathedral, the nave of which was a public promenade in those days), but could not find an opportunity to murder him; they then lay in wait for him on Rainham Down, and a second time in the Broomy Close (two places near Faversham), but on all these occasions failed in obtaining an opportunity." Rainham Down probably being Rainham on the North Downs.

The Newgate Calendar again expands on the basic narrative. Black Will followed Green to London. The duo soon met Thomas Arden who had traveled there for his own purposes. Green used a walk to Old St Paul's Cathedral to have Will take a close look at his intended victim. Arden was accompanied by a servant called Michael or Marry who was loyal to Alice. Green wanted to use the servant to gain access to Arden's lodgings in London. Black Will offered to kill both master and servant instead. Green informed the servant of this threat to his own life. This backfired. The servant was terrified of Black Will, making sure to bolt the doors of their lodgings at night, preventing Will or anyone else from entering.

An attempt to ambush Arden on his return journey also failed. The servant pretended that his horse went lame, having Arden travel alone. Instead, Arden convinced various acquaintances to travel with him, never actually being isolated enough for Will to ambush him. Arden returned home safely.

Arden had business with Thomas Cheney, Lord Warden of the Cinque Ports in South-East England. He had his servant travel to the Isle of Sheppey and meet Cheney. The servant returned with a letter from Cheney. Alice concealed the letter and had the servant claim to have lost it. This had the intended effect. Thomas decided to travel to the Isle of Sheppey and meet Cheney in person. Black Will and George Shakebag, a fellow highwayman, were instructed by Alice to ambush him on his way there "in a broom-close between Feversham and the Ferry". Unfamiliar with the area, the highwaymen set their ambush at the wrong location, failing to meet Arden either at his journey to the Isle or on his return.

Another idea to accomplish the deed was stillborn. Valentine's Day was approaching and there would be a fair. Moseby would have to pick a fight with Thomas in public and then end the life of his rival in a duel. With Thomas's known reluctance to fight, the idea of him accepting a challenge was deemed absurd.

== Murder ==
Holinshed continues: "The wicked wife then laid a plot for murdering her husband in his own house. She procured the services of Mosbye's sister, Cicely Pounder, and of two of Arden's domestic servants, Michael Saunderson and Elizabeth Stafford. On a particular day selected Sunday, Black Will was hidden in a closet at the end of Arden's parlour. After supper, Arden sat down to play some kind of game with Mosbye; Green stood at Arden's back, holding a candle in his hand, to shaddowe Black Will when he should come out; and the other conspirators had their cue. At a given signal in the game, Black Will came with a napkyn in his hand, and suddenly came behind Arden's back, threw the said napkyn over his hedd and face, and strangled him; and forthwith Mosbye stept to him, and strake him with a taylor's great pressing iron upon the scull to the braine, and immediately drew out his dagger, which was groat and broad, and therewith cut the said Arden's throat."

Alice herself stabbed the body seven or eight times. Will helped drag the body into the closet. He then received eight pounds for his services. Cicely Pounder later helped transferring the body to the Almery Croft, a meadow behind the house. Finishing the task, "the doubly wicked Alice and her companions danced, and played on the virginals, and were merrie." All this noise had a purpose. They wanted to have the neighbours think that Thomas Arden was still alive and entertaining friends. The corpse dressed in night-clothes would convince them of the hour of its death.

From here, the Newgate Calendar account diverges considerably. At last, Alice and her fellow conspirators decided to kill Thomas within the walls of their house. She arranged for most of their servants to be sent on various tasks outside the residence, "except those who were privy and consenting to the villainous design". She had Black Will hide in a closet located at the parlour of the residence, waiting for a pre-arranged signal to come out. At about 7 p.m, Thomas returned home to find Moseby already there. He was told their supper was not ready yet. The two men agreed to a game of backgammon while waiting for Alice to call them.

The two men were in the parlour, with Arden having his back turned to the closet. Moseby kept him distracted until voicing the signal "Now I may take you, Sir!". Will rushed from the closet and started strangling their victim with a towel. Moseby struck Arden with a fourteen-pound pressing iron. He was knocked out. The two men then transferred their victim to his counting house. There, Will finished him. Will stole the money from the corpse's pockets and stripped it of its rings. Alice paid him his ten pounds and Green provided him with a horse to make his escape.

Alice, to make certain that her husband was indeed dead, stabbed him seven or eight times. Then she had the parlour cleaned and the blood wiped away with a cloth. The bloody knife and cloth were then discarded. When everything was prepared, guests started arriving for a delayed supper. They included Moseby's sister, Cicely. Alice feigned ignorance at the reasons her husband was taking so long to return home. "When supper was over, Mrs Arden made her daughter play on the virginals, and they danced, and she amongst them."

Alice made sure to keep her guests around as long as possible while constantly reminding them of the suspicious absence of her spouse. Then she sent most of the servants out to look for their master. Meanwhile, Alice, her daughter Margaret Arden, Cicely Pounder and the maid Elizabeth Stafford would transport the corpse outside the house. They "carried it out into a field adjoining to the churchyard, and to his own garden wall, through which he went to church." They laid it down "about ten paces from the door of that garden", making it seem that Thomas was murdered outside.

== Discovery ==
According to Holinshed, Alice waited until the following morning to alert the town that her husband had gone missing. The townspeople conducted a search and the corpse was discovered. "Some of the people saw a 'long rushe or two from the parlour floor there were no carpets in those days, stuck between one of his slippers and his foot. Suspicion being aroused, the house was searched, and it was soon found that Arden had been murdered in his own parlour.' Very likely Alice's conduct as a wife had already attracted public attention; for she was at once accused of the murder."

The Newgate Calendar gives a rather different account. That night, Alice made a show of her supposed worry for her spouse's disappearance. She had her servants search for him late into the night, wept and lamented, alerted the neighbours. At last the local mayor was informed and a town-wide search was contacted. When the corpse was discovered, the people involved with the search started doubting the innocence of Alice. It was a cold winter night and there was fresh snow on the ground, but the body was only dressed in "its night-gown and slippers", making it seem unlikely that he was going about his business in town when killed. The fresh snow had preserved footprints of several people in the distance between the location of the body and the residence of the Ardens, making it plain the body had been transported from the house to its current position.

Suspicions immediately fell on Alice. She was confronted by the mayor and "very strictly examined" on the murder of her husband. She initially denied any knowledge of the deed. But the people of the town conducted further searches near the house, discovering hair and blood of the victim, the bloody knife and the cloth, which was discarded but poorly hidden. Alice was at length forced to confess to her guilt, while also naming her associates. The two Arden ladies (mother and daughter), the servant and the maid were immediately arrested and sent to prison. Moseby was not present. He was found sleeping at the "Flower-de-Luce" (fleur-de-lis), the house of Adam Fowle, which he frequented. With blood found on his stockings and coin purse, this conspirator was also arrested.

A bit more controversial was the arrest of Bradshaw. He was mentioned in the correspondence between Alice and Green as the man who introduced them to Black Will. The goldsmith was then accused of being a "procurer of Black Will". He was otherwise unconnected to the case. The rest of the accused claimed to have never even met the man, much less conversed or conspired with him, but his protests of innocence failed to convince the court.

== Execution ==
Alice Arden was found guilty of the crime of murder (Petty treason) and burnt at the stake in Canterbury. Her co-conspirators were all rounded up and executed by various means and at different locations. Michael Saunderson was drawn and hanged or hanged in chains at Feversham. Elizabeth Stafford, the maid, was burned at the stake in Faversham. Richard Mosbye and Cicely Pounder, brother and sister, were hanged at Smithfield; George Bradshaw was hanged in chains at Canterbury.

There are two accounts given on the fate of John Green. Holinshed simply mentions that Green was hanged at Faversham. The Newgate Calendar has him evading arrest for some years. He was eventually caught and "hanged in chains in the highway between Ospringe and Boughton". Before he died, Green attempted to clear the name of Bradshaw, proclaiming the innocence of the long-dead goldsmith.

Black Will ended his life on a scaffold. Holinshed mentions that Will "escaped for many years, but was at length taken, and 'brent on a scaffolde at Flushing'". This could be Flushing, Cornwall. The Newgate Calendar agrees on the manner of death but places the execution at Flushing, Zeeland. Adam Fowle was also implicated and incarcerated for some time in the Marshalsea prison. He alone was found innocent and discharged.

== Aftermath ==
Chambers Book of Days mentions the event entering local legend. "It was long said that no grass would grow on the spot where Arden's dead body was found; some, in accordance with the superstitions of the times, attributed this to the murder; while others declared that 'the field he hadde cruelly taken from a widow woman, who had curst him most bitterly, even to his face, wishing that all the world might wonder on him.'"

In 1592, the events were dramatized in the play Arden of Faversham. The paternity of the play has been long disputed, with William Shakespeare being the most prominent of the candidates, and Thomas Watson purported to be the main author in 2020. The play was later adapted by George Lillo into a domestic tragedy. Alice Arden's story was also adapted into a broadside ballad, "The complaint and lamentation of Mistresse Arden of Feversham in Kent".
