= Listed buildings in the borough of Swale, Kent =

There are about 1,400 Listed Buildings in the Borough of Swale, Kent , which are buildings of architectural or historic interest.

- Grade I buildings are of exceptional interest.
- Grade II* buildings are particularly important buildings of more than special interest.
- Grade II buildings are of special interest.

The lists follow Historic England’s geographical organisation, with entries grouped by county, local authority, and parish (civil and non-civil). The following lists are arranged by parish.

Parish	Listed buildings list	Grade I	Grade II*	Grade II	Total
Badlesmere	Listed buildings in Badlesmere				
Bapchild	Listed buildings in Bapchild				
Bobbing	Listed buildings in Bobbing, Kent				
Borden	Listed buildings in Borden, Kent				
Boughton under Blean	Listed buildings in Boughton under Blean				
Bredgar	Listed buildings in Bredgar				
Doddington	Listed buildings in Doddington, Kent				
Dunkirk	Listed buildings in Dunkirk, Kent				
Eastchurch	Listed buildings in Eastchurch				
Eastling	Listed buildings in Eastling				
Faversham	Listed buildings in Faversham	2	23	319	345
Graveney with Goodnestone	Listed buildings in Graveney with Goodnestone				
Halfway Houses	Listed buildings in Halfway Houses, Kent				
Hartlip	Listed buildings in Hartlip				
Hernhill	Listed buildings in Hernhill				
Iwade	Listed buildings in Iwade, Kent				
Leaveland	Listed buildings in Leaveland				
Leysdown-on-Sea	Listed buildings in Leysdown-on-Sea	0	1	4	5
Lower Halstow	Listed buildings in Lower Halstow				
Luddenham	Listed buildings in Luddenham, Kent				
Lynsted with Kingsdown	Listed buildings in Lynsted with Kingsdown	2	6	64	72
Milstead	Listed buildings in Milstead				
Minster-on-Sea	Listed buildings in Minster-on-Sea, Kent				
Newington	Listed buildings in Newington, Swale				
Newnham	Listed buildings in Newnham, Kent				
Norton, Buckland and Stone	Listed buildings in Norton, Buckland and Stone				
Oare	Listed buildings in Oare, Kent				
Ospringe	Listed buildings in Ospringe				
Queenborough	Listed buildings in Queenborough				
Rodmersham	Listed buildings in Rodmersham				
Selling	Listed buildings in Selling, Kent				
Sheerness	Listed buildings in Sheerness				
Sheldwich	Listed buildings in Sheldwich				
Sittingbourne non-civil parish	Listed buildings in Sittingbourne	1	3	93	97
Stalisfield	Listed buildings in Stalisfield				
Teynham	Listed buildings in Teynham				
Throwley	Listed buildings in Throwley				
Tonge, Kent	Listed buildings in Tonge, Kent				
Tunstall	Listed buildings in Tunstall, Kent				
Upchurch	Listed buildings in Upchurch				
Warden	no listed buildings				
