= Listed buildings in Kent =

Historic buidlings in Kent, England

There are around 18,000 Listed buildings in Kent, which are buildings of architectural or historic interest.

- Grade I buildings are of exceptional interest.
- Grade II* buildings are particularly important buildings of more than special interest.
- Grade II buildings are of special interest.

The lists follow Historic England’s geographical organisation, with entries grouped by county, local authority, and parish (civil and non-civil). In Kent, the local authority areas are the districts and the unitary authority of Medway, and the following lists are arranged accordingly.

Local authority	Listed buildings list	Grade I	Grade II*	Grade II	Total	Map
Ashford	Listed buildings in the borough of Ashford, Kent	52	130	2,213	2,220	
Canterbury	Listed buildings in the City of Canterbury district, Kent	62	80	1,735	1,739	
Dartford	Listed buildings in the borough of Dartford, Kent	7	10	164	164	
Dover	Listed buildings in Dover district, Kent	38	110	1,779	1,927	
Folkestone and Hythe	Listed buildings in Folkestone and Hythe district, Kent	30	39	849	918	
Gravesham	Listed buildings in Gravesham district, Kent	10	21	279	310	
Maidstone	Listed buildings in the borough of Maidstone, Kent	43	104	1,876	2,023	
Medway	Listed buildings in Medway	49	78	526	653	
Sevenoaks	Listed buildings in Sevenoaks district, Kent	31	92	1,532	1,655	
Swale	Listed buildings in the borough of Swale, Kent	37	93	1,310	1,440	
Thanet	Listed buildings in Thanet District, Kent	11	29	994	1,011	
Tonbridge and Malling	Listed buildings in the borough of Tonbridge and Malling, Kent	38	77	1,205	1,320	
Tunbridge Wells	Listed buildings in the borough of Tunbridge Wells, Kent	28	133	2,066	2,247	
Total (Kent)	—	435	996	16,569	18,000	—

== See also ==
- Grade I listed buildings in Kent
- Grade II* listed buildings in Kent
