= Listed buildings in Halfway Houses, Kent =

Civil Parish in Kent, England

Halfway Houses is a village and unparished area in the Swale District of Kent, England. It contains three grade II listed buildings that are recorded in the National Heritage List for England.

This list is based on the information retrieved online from Historic England

== Key ==
Grade	Criteria
I	Buildings that are of exceptional interest
II*	Particularly important buildings of more than special interest
II	Buildings that are of special interest

== Listing ==
Name	Grade	Location	Type	Completed (Note: The date given is the date used by Historic England as significant for the initial building or that of an important part in the structure's description.)	Date designated	Grid ref. (Note: The grid reference is based on the British national grid reference system, sometimes known as OSGB36, used by the Ordnance Survey.) Geo-coordinates	Notes	Entry number (Note: The "List Entry Number" is a unique number assigned to each listed building and scheduled monument by Historic England.)	Image	Wikidata
Danley Farmhouse	II	Drove Road, Minster On Sea, Sheerness			30 June 1978	TQ9345673032; 51°25′24″N 0°46′52″E		1259759	Upload Photo	Q26550852
Sheppy Court	II	Halfway Road, Minster On Sea, Sheerness			30 June 1978	TQ9292773284; 51°25′33″N 0°46′25″E		1259760	Upload Photo	Q26550853
Neats Court	II	Queenborough Road, Minster On Sea, Sheerness			30 June 1978	TQ9218671587; 51°24′39″N 0°45′44″E		1258870	Upload Photo	Q26550062

== See also ==
- Grade I listed buildings in Kent
- Grade II* listed buildings in Kent

== Sources ==
- Newman, John (2013) [1969], Kent: North-East and East, The Buildings of England, New Haven and London: Yale University Press, ISBN 978-0-300-18506-5
