= Listed buildings in Hartlip =

Historic structures in Kent, England

Hartlip is a village and civil parish in the Swale District of Kent, England. It contains 22 listed buildings that are recorded in the National Heritage List for England. Of these one is grade I, three are grade II* and 18 are grade II.

This list is based on the information retrieved online from Historic England.

== Key ==
Grade	Criteria
I	Buildings that are of exceptional interest
II*	Particularly important buildings of more than special interest
II	Buildings that are of special interest

== Listing ==
Name	Grade	Location	Type	Completed (Note: The date given is the date used by Historic England as significant for the initial building or that of an important part in the structure's description.)	Date designated	Grid ref. (Note: The grid reference is based on the British national grid reference system, sometimes known as OSGB36, used by the Ordnance Survey.) Geo-coordinates	Notes	Entry number (Note: The "List Entry Number" is a unique number assigned to each listed building and scheduled monument by Historic England.)	Image	Wikidata
Ivy Cottage	II	Dane Lane			24 January 1967	TQ8354764321; 51°20′54″N 0°38′03″E		1069372	Upload Photo	Q26322320
Sweepstakes Farmhouse	II	Lower Road, Under Lynch			27 November 1984	TQ8393363703; 51°20′34″N 0°38′22″E		1343880	Upload Photo	Q26627648
7 Paradise Cottages and the Old Farmhouse	II	Lower Hartlip Road, ME9 7SU			24 January 1967	TQ8433364353; 51°20′54″N 0°38′44″E		1319978	Upload Photo	Q26606027
Barn 30 Yards North West of Place Farm	II	Place Lane			27 November 1984	TQ8346964184; 51°20′50″N 0°37′59″E		1343881	Upload Photo	Q26627649
Dovecot 30 Yards West of Place Farm	II	Place Lane			27 November 1984	TQ8342964169; 51°20′49″N 0°37′57″E		1116401	Upload Photo	Q26410017
Farm Storage Building 25 Yards South East of Place Farm	II	Place Lane			27 November 1984	TQ8341764126; 51°20′48″N 0°37′56″E		1069374	Upload Photo	Q26322325
Hartlip Place	II	Place Lane			24 January 1967	TQ8352064040; 51°20′45″N 0°38′02″E		1069373	Upload Photo	Q26322323
Place Farmhouse Garden Wall and Granary	II	Place Lane			24 January 1967	TQ8347464156; 51°20′49″N 0°37′59″E		1319979	Upload Photo	Q26606028
Queendown Warren	II*	Queendown Warren			27 August 1952	TQ8264563016; 51°20′13″N 0°37′14″E		1069375	Upload Photo	Q17546287
Warrren Cottage	II*	Queendown Warren			27 November 1984	TQ8323262875; 51°20′08″N 0°37′44″E		1116349	Upload Photo	Q17546356
Hartlip War Memorial	II	Sittingbourne, ME9 7TL	war memorial		22 April 2022	TQ8394164240; 51°20′51″N 0°38′24″E		1480544	Hartlip War Memorial More images	Q94515122
Barrows Cottages	II*	1-2, The Street			24 January 1967	TQ8386164009; 51°20′44″N 0°38′19″E		1319991	Upload Photo	Q17546455
Church of St Michael	I	The Street	church building		24 January 1967	TQ8392364283; 51°20′52″N 0°38′23″E		1320011	Church of St Michael More images	Q17530117
Grace Cottages	II	The Street			24 January 1967	TQ8372163863; 51°20′39″N 0°38′12″E		1069378	Upload Photo	Q26322331
Hartlip House	II	The Street			24 January 1967	TQ8396564246; 51°20′51″N 0°38′25″E		1343882	Upload Photo	Q26627650
Pope's Hall	II	The Street			24 January 1967	TQ8402964373; 51°20′55″N 0°38′28″E		1343883	Upload Photo	Q26627651
Stepp House	II	The Street			24 January 1967	TQ8391464150; 51°20′48″N 0°38′22″E		1343884	Upload Photo	Q26627652
Thatch Cottage	II	The Street			27 November 1984	TQ8396364264; 51°20′52″N 0°38′25″E		1069376	Upload Photo	Q26322327
Tomb of Mary Osborne, 3 Feet East of South Chapel of Church of St Michael	II	The Street			27 November 1984	TQ8393564279; 51°20′52″N 0°38′23″E		1320041	Upload Photo	Q26606083
Tombs of Adam and Richard Ruck, 5 Yards South East of Porch of Church of St Michael	II	The Street			27 November 1984	TQ8392764272; 51°20′52″N 0°38′23″E		1069377	Upload Photo	Q26322329
Wisteria Cottage	II	The Street			27 November 1984	TQ8397264293; 51°20′53″N 0°38′25″E		1319983	Upload Photo	Q26606032
Yew Tree Cottage	II	The Street			24 January 1967	TQ8384364041; 51°20′45″N 0°38′18″E		1320033	Upload Photo	Q26606075

== See also ==
- Grade I listed buildings in Kent
- Grade II* listed buildings in Kent

== Sources ==
- Newman, John (2013) [1969], Kent: North-East and East, The Buildings of England, New Haven and London: Yale University Press, ISBN 978-0-300-18506-5
