= Listed buildings in Leaveland =

Historic buildings in Kent, England

Leaveland is a village and civil parish in the Swale District of Kent, England. It contains nine listed buildings that are recorded in the National Heritage List for England. Of these two are grade II* and seven are grade II.

This list is based on the information retrieved online from Historic England.

== Key ==
Grade	Criteria
I	Buildings that are of exceptional interest
II*	Particularly important buildings of more than special interest
II	Buildings that are of special interest

== Listing ==
Name	Grade	Location	Type	Completed (Note: The date given is the date used by Historic England as significant for the initial building or that of an important part in the structure's description.)	Date designated	Grid ref. (Note: The grid reference is based on the British national grid reference system, sometimes known as OSGB36, used by the Ordnance Survey.) Geo-coordinates	Notes	Entry number (Note: The "List Entry Number" is a unique number assigned to each listed building and scheduled monument by Historic England.)	Image	Wikidata
Barn 30 Metres West of Leaveland Court	II				10 November 1986	TR0040054788; 51°15′25″N 0°52′14″E		1069933	Upload Photo	Q26323366
Church of St Lawrence	II*		church building		24 January 1967	TR0048854850; 51°15′27″N 0°52′19″E		1054051	Church of St Lawrence More images	Q17546162
Leaveland Court	II*				27 August 1952	TR0038954852; 51°15′27″N 0°52′14″E		1054067	Upload Photo	Q17546169
Monument to William Waterman, About 10 Metres South of Church of St Lawrence	II				10 November 1986	TR0049654840; 51°15′27″N 0°52′19″E		1069932	Upload Photo	Q26323364
Collington Farmhouse	II	Ashford Road			24 January 1967	TR0081853728; 51°14′50″N 0°52′34″E		1344051	Upload Photo	Q26627802
Milestone at TR 007 551	II	Ashford Road, Leaveland			1 September 1989	TR0068055066; 51°15′34″N 0°52′29″E		1363442	Upload Photo	Q26645268
Barn 20 Metres South West of Falcon Farmhouse	II	Badlesmere Lees			10 November 1986	TR0083754127; 51°15′03″N 0°52′35″E		1054732	Upload Photo	Q26306390
East View	II	Badlesmere Lees			10 November 1986	TR0083254061; 51°15′01″N 0°52′35″E		1054717	Upload Photo	Q26306375
Falcon Farmhouse	II	Badlesmere Lees			10 November 1986	TR0086554152; 51°15′04″N 0°52′37″E		1069929	Upload Photo	Q26323358

== See also ==
- Grade I listed buildings in Kent
- Grade II* listed buildings in Kent

== Sources ==
- Newman, John (2013) [1969], Kent: North-East and East, The Buildings of England, New Haven and London: Yale University Press, ISBN 978-0-300-18506-5
