= Halstow =

Halstow may refer to the following places in Kent, England:

- High Halstow
- Lower Halstow
