= Listed buildings in Lower Halstow =

Historic structures in Kent, England

Lower Halstow is a village and civil parish in the Swale District of Kent, England. It contains six grade II listed buildings that are recorded in the National Heritage List for England.

This list is based on the information retrieved online from Historic England.

== Key ==
Grade	Criteria
I	Buildings that are of exceptional interest
II*	Particularly important buildings of more than special interest
II	Buildings that are of special interest

== Listing ==
Name	Grade	Location	Type	Completed (Note: The date given is the date used by Historic England as significant for the initial building or that of an important part in the structure's description.)	Date designated	Grid ref. (Note: The grid reference is based on the British national grid reference system, sometimes known as OSGB36, used by the Ordnance Survey.) Geo-coordinates	Notes	Entry number (Note: The "List Entry Number" is a unique number assigned to each listed building and scheduled monument by Historic England.)	Image	Wikidata
Church of St. Margaret of Antioch	II	Sheerness Road	church building		24 January 1967	TQ8601767422; 51°22′31″N 0°40′17″E		1069343	Church of St. Margaret of Antioch More images	Q26322255
Little Barksore Farmhouse	II	Sheerness Road			27 November 1984	TQ8676867356; 51°22′28″N 0°40′55″E		1069342	Upload Photo	Q26322253
Stray Cottages	II	1-2, Sheerness Road			27 November 1984	TQ8638867414; 51°22′31″N 0°40′36″E		1069341	Upload Photo	Q26322251
Stray House	II	Sheerness Road			27 November 1984	TQ8624367397; 51°22′30″N 0°40′28″E		1069340	Upload Photo	Q26322249
Green Farm House	II	The Green			24 January 1967	TQ8568667233; 51°22′26″N 0°39′59″E		1069339	Upload Photo	Q26322247
The Three Tuns Inn	II	The Green			24 January 1967	TQ8592267266; 51°22′26″N 0°40′12″E		1069338	Upload Photo	Q26322245

== See also ==
- Grade I listed buildings in Kent
- Grade II* listed buildings in Kent

== Sources ==
- Newman, John (2013) [1969], Kent: North-East and East, The Buildings of England, New Haven and London: Yale University Press, ISBN 978-0-300-18506-5
