= Listed buildings in Throwley =

Civil Parish in Kent, England

Throwley is a village and civil parish in the Swale District of Kent, England. It contains 46 listed buildings that are recorded in the National Heritage List for England. Of these two are grade I, two are grade II* and 42 are grade II.

This list is based on the information retrieved online from Historic England .

== Key ==
Grade	Criteria
I	Buildings that are of exceptional interest
II*	Particularly important buildings of more than special interest
II	Buildings that are of special interest

== Listing ==
Name	Grade	Location	Type	Completed (Note: The date given is the date used by Historic England as significant for the initial building or that of an important part in the structure's description.)	Date designated	Grid ref. (Note: The grid reference is based on the British national grid reference system, sometimes known as OSGB36, used by the Ordnance Survey.) Geo-coordinates	Notes	Entry number (Note: The "List Entry Number" is a unique number assigned to each listed building and scheduled monument by Historic England.)	Image	Wikidata
Barn 30 Metres North of Bell's Forstal Farmhouse	II	Bell's Forstal			28 August 1986	TQ9943153642; 51°14′49″N 0°51′22″E		1281711	Upload Photo	Q26570729
Barns 20 Metres South of the Old Cottage	II	Bell's Forstal			28 August 1986	TQ9931353640; 51°14′50″N 0°51′16″E		1069209	Upload Photo	Q26322005
Bell's Forstall Farmhouse	II	Bell's Forstal			24 January 1967	TQ9939553584; 51°14′48″N 0°51′20″E		1069207	Upload Photo	Q26322000
The Old Cottage	II	Bells Forstal			28 August 1986	TQ9933053647; 51°14′50″N 0°51′17″E		1069208	Upload Photo	Q26322002
South Wilderton Cottages	II	1 and 2, Belmont			28 August 1986	TQ9907056493; 51°16′22″N 0°51′09″E		1069210	Upload Photo	Q26322007
Garden Pavilion at Belmont Park (tq984567)	II*	Belmont			28 August 1986	TQ9836556708; 51°16′30″N 0°50′33″E		1069173	Upload Photo	Q17546235
Garden Walls to North of Belmont	II	Belmont			28 August 1986	TQ9857156434; 51°16′21″N 0°50′43″E		1069172	Upload Photo	Q26321932
Ha-ha and Gates 50 Metres East of Belmont	II	Belmont			28 August 1986	TQ9865256377; 51°16′19″N 0°50′47″E		1343979	Upload Photo	Q26627738
New York Cottage	II	Belmont			24 January 1967	TQ9822556177; 51°16′13″N 0°50′25″E		1281708	Upload Photo	Q26570726
Pigeon House	II	Belmont			28 August 1986	TQ9930157094; 51°16′41″N 0°51′22″E		1203366	Upload Photo	Q26498907
Town Place	II	Belmont			24 January 1967	TQ9879656008; 51°16′07″N 0°50′54″E		1069171	Upload Photo	Q26321930
Town Place Cottage	II	Belmont			28 August 1986	TQ9897356403; 51°16′19″N 0°51′04″E		1069170	Upload Photo	Q26321928
Barn 30 Metres North of South Hill Farmhouse	II	Bethel Row			28 August 1986	TQ9969354076; 51°15′03″N 0°51′36″E		1343980	Upload Photo	Q26627739
Crooked Cottage	II	Bethel Row			28 August 1986	TQ9983254156; 51°15′06″N 0°51′44″E		1069174	Upload Photo	Q26321934
South Hill Farmhouse	II	Bethel Row			28 August 1986	TQ9969154051; 51°15′02″N 0°51′36″E		1281672	Upload Photo	Q26570695
Broomfield Farmhouse	II	Broomfield			24 January 1967	TR0032752895; 51°14′24″N 0°52′07″E		1203455	Upload Photo	Q26498989
Hockley House	II	Church Road, ME13 0HL			24 January 1967	TQ9802055026; 51°15′36″N 0°50′12″E		1069175	Upload Photo	Q26321936
Little Hockley Farmhouse	II	Old Hockley Road			28 August 1986	TQ9809454945; 51°15′33″N 0°50′16″E		1281687	Upload Photo	Q26570707
Parsonage Farm	II	Parsonage Stocks Road			24 January 1967	TQ9978455935; 51°16′03″N 0°51′45″E		1343981	Upload Photo	Q26627740
The Thatched Cottage	II	Parsonage Stocks Road, ME13 0PN			28 August 1986	TQ9977955990; 51°16′05″N 0°51′45″E		1069176	Upload Photo	Q26321938
Snoad Street Cottage	II	Snoadstreet			28 August 1986	TQ9912852219; 51°14′04″N 0°51′04″E		1069177	Upload Photo	Q26321940
Snoad Street Manor	II*	Snoadstreet			27 August 1952	TQ9921252434; 51°14′11″N 0°51′08″E		1203485	Upload Photo	Q17546377
Agricultural Buildings Approximately 10 Metres South East of South Forstal Farmhouse	II	Throwley Forstal			28 August 1986	TQ9878254240; 51°15′10″N 0°50′50″E		1281657	Upload Photo	Q26570682
Church of St Michael and All Angels	I	Throwley Forstal	church building		28 August 1986	TQ9914455651; 51°15′55″N 0°51′11″E		1343984	Church of St Michael and All Angels More images	Q17530158
Forge Farmhouse	II	Throwley Forstal			24 January 1967	TQ9880854235; 51°15′09″N 0°50′51″E		1069178	Upload Photo	Q26321942
Forge House	II	Throwley Forstal			28 August 1986	TQ9883654256; 51°15′10″N 0°50′53″E		1203505	Upload Photo	Q26499034
Old Barn Cottage	II	Throwley Forstal			28 August 1986	TQ9873454274; 51°15′11″N 0°50′47″E		1203508	Upload Photo	Q26499036
Post Office and Whitings House	II	Throwley Forstal			24 January 1967	TQ9889154260; 51°15′10″N 0°50′55″E		1281656	Upload Photo	Q26570681
South Forstal Farmhouse	II	Throwley Forstal			28 August 1986	TQ9875954241; 51°15′10″N 0°50′49″E		1343982	Upload Photo	Q26627741
The Windmill Inn	II	Throwley Forstal			24 January 1967	TQ9887354247; 51°15′10″N 0°50′54″E		1343983	Upload Photo	Q26627742
Monument to John Kemp, 1 Metre South East of Church of St Michael	II	1 Metre South East Of Church Of St Michael, Throwley Rkoad			28 August 1986	TQ9915455640; 51°15′54″N 0°51′12″E		1069181	Upload Photo	Q26321948
Monument to Robert Chapman, 1 Metre West of South Porch of Church of St Michael	II	1 Metre West Of South Porch Of Church Of St Michael, Throwley Road			28 August 1986	TQ9913655641; 51°15′54″N 0°51′11″E		1203524	Upload Photo	Q26499051
Monument to John Hughes, 10 Metres South East of Church of St Michael	II	10 Metres South East Of Church Of St Michael, Throwley Road			28 August 1986	TQ9917155640; 51°15′54″N 0°51′13″E		1281630	Upload Photo	Q26570660
Barn 30 Metres West of Valley Farmhouse	II	Throwley Road			28 August 1986	TQ9986855111; 51°15′36″N 0°51′47″E		1069180	Upload Photo	Q26321945
Barn Approximately 40 Metres South of Parklane Farmhouse with Enclosing Farmyard Walls	II	Throwley Road			28 August 1986	TQ9906454465; 51°15′17″N 0°51′05″E		1281528	Upload Photo	Q26570569
Church House	II	Throwley Road			27 August 1952	TQ9920355672; 51°15′55″N 0°51′14″E		1203514	Upload Photo	Q26499041
Granary Approximately 20 Metres South East of Parklane Farmhouse	II	Throwley Road			28 August 1986	TQ9905754482; 51°15′17″N 0°51′04″E		1069182	Upload Photo	Q26321949
Parklane Farmhouse	II	Throwley Road			24 January 1967	TQ9906154511; 51°15′18″N 0°51′05″E		1343985	Upload Photo	Q26627743
Valley Farmhouse	II	Throwley Road			28 August 1986	TQ9989755062; 51°15′35″N 0°51′49″E		1069179	Upload Photo	Q26321944
Tong Green Farmhouse	II	Tong Green			24 January 1967	TQ9796554151; 51°15′08″N 0°50′08″E		1203813	Upload Photo	Q26499321
Barn Approximately 20 Metres South East of Wilgate Green Farmhouse	II	Wilgate Green			28 August 1986	TQ9999156776; 51°16′30″N 0°51′57″E		1343986	Upload Photo	Q26627744
Wilgate Green Farmhouse	II	Wilgate Green			27 August 1952	TQ9994856793; 51°16′31″N 0°51′55″E		1069183	Upload Photo	Q26321951
Wilgate House	II	Wilgate Green			27 July 2009	TQ9988056761; 51°16′30″N 0°51′51″E		1393392	Upload Photo	Q26672557
Belmont, with Stable Courtyard and Pump	I	With Stable Courtyard And Pump, Belmont	English country house		24 January 1967	TQ9858656362; 51°16′18″N 0°50′44″E		1343978	Belmont, with Stable Courtyard and Pump More images	Q4884384
Old Workhouse	II	Workhouse Road			28 August 1986	TQ9937554530; 51°15′18″N 0°51′21″E		1069184	Upload Photo	Q26321953

== See also ==
- Grade I listed buildings in Kent
- Grade II* listed buildings in Kent

== Sources ==
- Newman, John (2013) [1969], Kent: North-East and East, The Buildings of England, New Haven and London: Yale University Press, ISBN 978-0-300-18506-5
