= Badlesmere, Kent =

Village in Kent, England

Coordinates: 51.259°N 0.885°E

Badlesmere
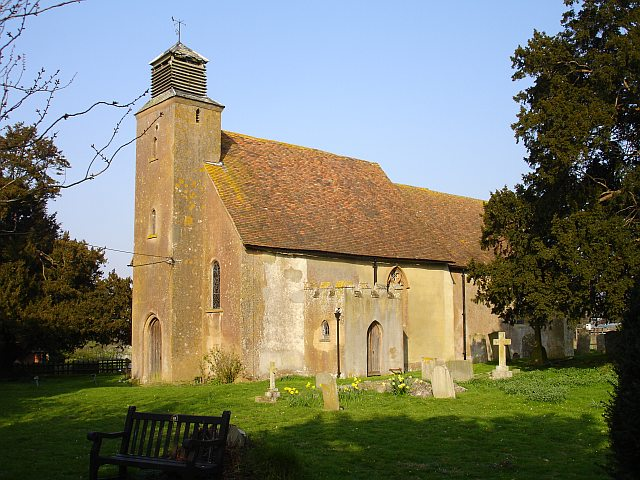
- St Leonard's Church

- Location within Kent
- Population: 134 (2011 Census)
- District: Swale
- Shire county: Kent
- Region: South East
- Country: England
- Sovereign state: United Kingdom
- Post town: Faversham
- Postcode district: ME13 0
- Police: Kent
- Fire: Kent
- Ambulance: South East Coast
- UK Parliament: Faversham and Mid Kent

Badlesmere is a village and civil parish in the Swale district of Kent, England, about five miles south of Faversham and eight miles north of Ashford on the A251.

Also called Basmere, 'Badelesmere' was recorded in the Domesday Book of 1086, which noted that in the time of King Edward the Confessor, the parish was worth sixty shillings. The manor was previously owned by Odo, Earl of Kent (as the Bishop of Bayeux), but, following his trial (for fraud) in 1076, his assets were re-apportioned, including Badlesmere. The abbot of St. Augustine's then claimed this manor.

During the reign of King Richard I of England (1189–1199), the manor was held by Guncelin Badlesmere, who had accompanied the king during his Siege of Acre in Palestine. The manor passed through several generations of the Badlesmere family, including Guncelin Badlesmere (died 1301), who was Justice of Chester and his son Bartholomew Badlesmere, 1st Baron (died 1322), who was governor of Leeds Castle in Kent. He obtained the king's licence to found a priory on his lands but nothing came of it.

In 1523, Sir Thomas Randolph (an eminent statesman during the reign Queen Elizabeth I), was born here.

The church, dedicated to St Leonard, is a grade II* listed Anglican church, described as "interesting as a small, quite unremarkable church" which was not 'restored' in the Victorian era. Its interior is 13th century and 18th century. It has a complete set of Georgian box pews. In 1887, J.C.L. Stahlschmidt reported that the bell hanging in the church was one of those made in 1635 by Joseph Hatch for St Mary's Church, Reculver; the church at Reculver was demolished in 1809.

Forge cottage, at the northern side of the Lees, is a typical Wealden hall house dating from the late 15th century.

The village green, known as Badlesmere Lees, lies off the main road between the towns of Faversham and Ashford.

The parish has been linked for many years with that of Leaveland, whose mediaeval church (built in 1222) is very different from Badlesmere. It has a crown-post roof and a 16th-century monument to a local family survived the Victorian restoration. The village forms part of the civil parish of Sheldwich, Badlesmere and Leaveland.

== In popular culture ==
Badlesmere is used in The Meaning of Liff (book by Douglas Adams) to define "Someone who dishonestly ticks the "I have read the terms and conditions" box on a website".

Author Russell Hoban repurposes Badlesmere as "Bad Mercy" in his 1980, post apocalyptic novel Riddley Walker.

== See also ==
- Listed buildings in Badlesmere

== Bibliography ==
- Harris, S. (2001), Richborough and Reculver, English Heritage, ISBN 978-1-85074-765-9
- Stahlschmidt, J.C.L. (1887), The Church Bells of Kent: Their Inscriptions, Founders, Uses and Traditions, Stock, OCLC 12772194
