= Listed buildings in Newnham, Kent =

Civil Parish in Kent, England

Newnham is a village and civil parish in the Swale District of Kent, England. It contains 25 listed buildings that are recorded in the National Heritage List for England. Of these four grade II* and 21 are grade II.

This list is based on the information retrieved online from Historic England.

== Key ==
| Grade | Criteria |
|---|---|
| I | Buildings that are of exceptional interest |
| II* | Particularly important buildings of more than special interest |
| II | Buildings that are of special interest |

== Listing ==
| Name | Grade | Location | Type | Completed (Note: The date given is the date used by Historic England as significant for the initial building or that of an important part in the structure's description.) | Date designated | Grid ref. (Note: The grid reference is based on the British national grid reference system, sometimes known as OSGB36, used by the Ordnance Survey.) Geo-coordinates | Notes | Entry number (Note: The "List Entry Number" is a unique number assigned to each listed building and scheduled monument by Historic England.) | Image | Wikidata |
|---|---|---|---|---|---|---|---|---|---|---|
| Champion Court | II* | | | | 27 August 1952 | TQ9558657984; 51°17′15″N 0°48′12″E | | 1343938 | Upload Photo | Q17546525 |
| Foxenden Manor | II* | Foxenden | | | 27 August 1952 | TQ9445156554; 51°16′30″N 0°47′11″E | | 1366585 | Upload Photo | Q17546600 |
| Old Frith Farm | II | Frith | | | 24 January 1967 | TQ9455555384; 51°15′52″N 0°47′14″E | | 1069243 | Upload Photo | Q26322073 |
| Lower Champion Court | II | Newnham Valley | | | 24 January 1967 | TQ9608058018; 51°17′15″N 0°48′38″E | | 1343939 | Upload Photo | Q26627700 |
| Old Thatch Cottage | II | Newnham Valley | | | 28 August 1986 | TQ9607658048; 51°17′16″N 0°48′38″E | | 1055852 | Upload Photo | Q26307474 |
| Valley Cottage | II | Newnham Valley | | | 28 August 1986 | TQ9637358299; 51°17′24″N 0°48′54″E | | 1069244 | Upload Photo | Q26322075 |
| White Hall Farmhouse | II | Newnham Valley | | | 28 August 1986 | TQ9655958359; 51°17′26″N 0°49′03″E | | 1055851 | Upload Photo | Q26307473 |
| 25, the Street | II | 25, The Street | building | | 24 January 1967 | TQ9555257683; 51°17′05″N 0°48′10″E | | 1055726 | 25, the Street More images | Q26309474 |
| 38, the Street | II | 38, The Street | | | 24 January 1967 | TQ9548557684; 51°17′05″N 0°48′07″E | | 1343940 | Upload Photo | Q26627701 |
| 46, the Street | II | 46, The Street | | | 28 August 1986 | TQ9542757662; 51°17′04″N 0°48′04″E | | 1069246 | Upload Photo | Q26322079 |
| 47, the Street | II | 47, The Street | | | 28 August 1986 | TQ9531257632; 51°17′04″N 0°47′58″E | | 1055791 | Upload Photo | Q26307413 |
| 48 and 50, the Street | II | 48 and 50, The Street | | | 28 August 1986 | TQ9541657661; 51°17′04″N 0°48′03″E | | 1055834 | Upload Photo | Q26307456 |
| Calico House | II* | The Street | house | | 27 August 1952 | TQ9520857612; 51°17′03″N 0°47′52″E | | 1069247 | Calico House More images | Q17546244 |
| Church of St Peter and St Paul | II* | The Street | church building | | 24 January 1967 | TQ9540157627; 51°17′03″N 0°48′02″E | | 1055749 | Church of St Peter and St Paul More images | Q17546182 |
| Doddington and Newnham War Memorial | II | The Street | | | 13 January 2011 | TQ9449157222; 51°16′51″N 0°47′15″E | | 1396404 | Upload Photo | Q26675192 |
| Forge Cottage | II | 30, The Street | | | 28 August 1986 | TQ9552257699; 51°17′06″N 0°48′09″E | | 1069245 | Upload Photo | Q26322077 |
| Foxwood End | II | The Street | | | 28 August 1986 | TQ9501957521; 51°17′00″N 0°47′42″E | | 1069249 | Upload Photo | Q26322083 |
| K6 Telephone Kiosk | II | The Street | | | 8 July 2009 | TQ9538057648; 51°17′04″N 0°48′01″E | | 1393352 | Upload Photo | Q26672522 |
| Little Thatch | II | 28, The Street | | | 28 August 1986 | TQ9553357701; 51°17′06″N 0°48′09″E | | 1055860 | Upload Photo | Q26307481 |
| Park House | II | The Street | | | 22 July 1977 | TQ9485757454; 51°16′58″N 0°47′34″E | | 1055783 | Upload Photo | Q26307404 |
| Parsonage Farm | II | 39, The Street | | | 28 August 1986 | TQ9536257637; 51°17′04″N 0°48′00″E | | 1069250 | Upload Photo | Q26322085 |
| Rose Cottage | II | 37, The Street | | | 28 August 1986 | TQ9545957646; 51°17′04″N 0°48′05″E | | 1069251 | Upload Photo | Q26322087 |
| The George Inn | II | 44, The Street | pub | | 28 August 1986 | TQ9544457664; 51°17′04″N 0°48′05″E | | 1055829 | The George Inn More images | Q26307451 |
| 104 and 106, the Street | II | 104 and 106, The Street | | | 28 August 1986 | TQ9516157588; 51°17′02″N 0°47′50″E | | 1366607 | Upload Photo | Q26648189 |
| 108-112, the Street | II | 108-112, The Street | | | 28 August 1986 | TQ9514857584; 51°17′02″N 0°47′49″E | | 1069248 | Upload Photo | Q26322081 |

== See also ==
- Grade I listed buildings in Kent
- Grade II* listed buildings in Kent

== Sources ==
- Newman, John (2013) [1969], Kent: North-East and East, The Buildings of England, New Haven and London: Yale University Press, ISBN 978-0-300-18506-5
