= Listed buildings in Sheldwich =

Civil Parish in Kent, England

Sheldwich is a village and civil parish in the Swale District of Kent, England. It contains 46 listed buildings that are recorded in the National Heritage List for England. Of these two are grade I, two are grade II* and 46 are grade II.

This list is based on the information retrieved online from Historic England.

== Key ==
Grade	Criteria
I	Buildings that are of exceptional interest
II*	Particularly important buildings of more than special interest
II	Buildings that are of special interest

== Listing ==
Name	Grade	Location	Type	Completed (Note: The date given is the date used by Historic England as significant for the initial building or that of an important part in the structure's description.)	Date designated	Grid ref. (Note: The grid reference is based on the British national grid reference system, sometimes known as OSGB36, used by the Ordnance Survey.) Geo-coordinates	Notes	Entry number (Note: The "List Entry Number" is a unique number assigned to each listed building and scheduled monument by Historic England.)	Image	Wikidata
Halke Cottages	II	1 and 2, Ashford Road, North Street			10 November 1986	TR0141757819; 51°17′02″N 0°53′13″E		1069920	Upload Photo	Q26323342
Lords Cottages	II	1-5, Ashford Road			23 April 1987	TR0102455566; 51°15′50″N 0°52′48″E		1270399	Upload Photo	Q26560457
8, Ashford Road	II	8, Ashford Road, North Street			10 November 1986	TR0128057853; 51°17′03″N 0°53′06″E		1363412	Upload Photo	Q26645239
Barn, Now Garage About 10 Metres East of the Stocks	II	Ashford Road			10 November 1986	TR0105856702; 51°16′26″N 0°52′52″E		1069084	Upload Photo	Q26321775
Barn Approximately 80 Metres to North of Copton Manor	II	Ashford Road, Faversham, ME13 0DL			22 March 2012	TR0173059104; 51°17′43″N 0°53′32″E		1407589	Upload Photo	Q26675944
Bier House 30 Metres South East of Church of St James	II	Ashford Road			10 November 1986	TR0116256845; 51°16′31″N 0°52′58″E		1049036	Upload Photo	Q26301091
Church of St James	II*	Ashford Road	church building		24 January 1967	TR0113356863; 51°16′31″N 0°52′56″E		1049130	Church of St James More images	Q17546156
Colbrahamsole Farmhouse and Garden Wall	II	Ashford Road			24 January 1967	TR0098656434; 51°16′18″N 0°52′48″E		1069086	Upload Photo	Q26321779
Copton Manor	I	Ashford Road, North Street			24 January 1967	TR0170659022; 51°17′41″N 0°53′30″E		1372896	Upload Photo	Q17530165
Little Lords	II	Ashford Road			10 November 1986	TR0098355524; 51°15′48″N 0°52′46″E		1372880	Upload Photo	Q26653929
Maybank	II	Ashford Road, North Street			10 November 1986	TR0137558065; 51°17′10″N 0°53′11″E		1069919	Upload Photo	Q26323340
Milestone at Tr 013 581	II	Ashford Road			1 September 1989	TR0137458102; 51°17′11″N 0°53′11″E		1069899	Upload Photo	Q26323301
North Street Farmhouse	II	Ashford Road, North Street			10 November 1986	TR0133558023; 51°17′09″N 0°53′09″E		1069921	Upload Photo	Q26323344
Stable Block About 10 Metres North of Throwley House	II	Ashford Road			10 November 1986	TR0106456860; 51°16′31″N 0°52′53″E		1372876	Upload Photo	Q26653926
The Manor House	II	Ashford Road			24 January 1967	TR0106156638; 51°16′24″N 0°52′52″E		1051678	Upload Photo	Q26303520
The Stocks (stocks Garage)	II	Ashford Road			10 November 1986	TR0108856687; 51°16′26″N 0°52′54″E		1069083	Upload Photo	Q26321773
Three Chest Tombs About 10 Metres South of Chancel of Church of St James	II	Ashford Road			10 November 1986	TR0114456845; 51°16′31″N 0°52′57″E		1069085	Upload Photo	Q26321777
Throwley House	II*	Ashford Road			2 November 1978	TR0105556839; 51°16′31″N 0°52′52″E		1344050	Upload Photo	Q17546563
Tollgate House	II	Ashford Road, North Street			10 November 1986	TR0136958093; 51°17′11″N 0°53′11″E		1363413	Upload Photo	Q26645240
Yew Tree Cottage	II	Ashford Road			10 November 1986	TR0105056347; 51°16′15″N 0°52′51″E		1069082	Upload Photo	Q26321771
Dairy Court, Estate House and Courtyard, Lees Court	II	Estate House And Courtyard, Lees Court			24 January 1967	TR0199156106; 51°16′06″N 0°53′39″E		1054075	Upload Photo	Q26305757
Little Fisher Street House	II	Fisher Street			10 November 1986	TR0304454360; 51°15′08″N 0°54′30″E		1363415	Upload Photo	Q26645242
Gates About 5 Metres East of the Gate House (t.r. 016559)	II	Lees Court, Sheldwich Lees			10 November 1986	TR0169355879; 51°15′59″N 0°53′23″E		1069897	Upload Photo	Q26323297
Lees Court	I	Lees Court			27 August 1952	TR0203656066; 51°16′05″N 0°53′41″E		1363416	Upload Photo	Q17530162
Stable Yard	II	Lees Court			24 January 1967	TR0196256131; 51°16′07″N 0°53′37″E		1298858	Upload Photo	Q26586301
The Post Office and Cottage Attached	II	Lees Court Road, Sheldwich Lees			10 November 1986	TR0129256442; 51°16′18″N 0°53′04″E		1363441	Upload Photo	Q26645267
Barn About 30 Metres North West of Newhouse Farmhouse	II	New House			10 November 1986	TR0221657201; 51°16′41″N 0°53′53″E		1363417	Upload Photo	Q26645243
Barn About 30 Metres South of Gosmere Farmhouse	II	New House			10 November 1986	TR0224357367; 51°16′46″N 0°53′54″E		1069937	Upload Photo	Q26323374
Barn About 50 Metres West of Newhouse Farmhouse	II	New House			10 November 1986	TR0218957200; 51°16′41″N 0°53′51″E		1069935	Upload Photo	Q26323370
Dovecote About 15 Metres West of Gosmere Farmhouse	II	New House			10 November 1986	TR0225657423; 51°16′48″N 0°53′55″E		1372022	Upload Photo	Q26653146
Gosmere Farmhouse	II	New House			24 January 1967	TR0226557406; 51°16′48″N 0°53′56″E		1187161	Upload Photo	Q26482383
Newhouse Court and South House	II	New House			27 August 1952	TR0246557244; 51°16′42″N 0°54′06″E		1363418	Upload Photo	Q26645244
Newhouse Farm Cottage	II	New House			27 August 1952	TR0241857223; 51°16′41″N 0°54′03″E		1187145	Upload Photo	Q26482369
Newhouse Farmhouse	II	New House			27 August 1952	TR0224957154; 51°16′39″N 0°53′54″E		1069934	Upload Photo	Q26323368
Oast About 10 Metres West of Gosmere Farmhouse	II	New House			10 November 1986	TR0223857408; 51°16′48″N 0°53′54″E		1363419	Upload Photo	Q26645245
Oast Cottage	II	New House			24 January 1967	TR0230757103; 51°16′38″N 0°53′57″E		1069936	Upload Photo	Q26323372
Stables About 30 Metres West of Newhouse Farmhouse	II	New House			10 November 1986	TR0220557165; 51°16′40″N 0°53′52″E		1298863	Upload Photo	Q26586306
Chambers Cottage	II	Sheldwich Lees			10 February 1976	TR0155256267; 51°16′12″N 0°53′17″E		1069938	Upload Photo	Q26323376
Meadow Cottage	II	Sheldwich Lees			10 February 1976	TR0133356135; 51°16′08″N 0°53′05″E		1372014	Upload Photo	Q26653137
The Old Bakery	II	Sheldwich Lees			10 February 1976	TR0148756290; 51°16′12″N 0°53′13″E		1372009	Upload Photo	Q26653132
The Old Cottage	II	Sheldwich Lees			10 February 1976	TR0142456035; 51°16′04″N 0°53′10″E		1372047	Upload Photo	Q26653171
The Old School and Old School House	II	Sheldwich Lees			24 January 1967	TR0141356076; 51°16′06″N 0°53′09″E		1069940	Upload Photo	Q26323381
The White House	II	Sheldwich Lees			10 February 1976	TR0143556140; 51°16′08″N 0°53′10″E		1363420	Upload Photo	Q26645246
West End	II	Sheldwich Lees			10 November 1986	TR0156156243; 51°16′11″N 0°53′17″E		1069939	Upload Photo	Q26323378
Yew Tree Cottage	II	Sheldwich Lees			10 February 1976	TR0159755869; 51°15′59″N 0°53′18″E		1040074	Upload Photo	Q26291879
Westwood Court	II	1-3, Westwood Court			10 November 1986	TR0204659416; 51°17′53″N 0°53′48″E		1069898	Upload Photo	Q26323299

== See also ==
- Grade I listed buildings in Kent
- Grade II* listed buildings in Kent

== Sources ==
- Newman, John (2013) [1969], Kent: North-East and East, The Buildings of England, New Haven and London: Yale University Press, ISBN 978-0-300-18506-5
