= Listed buildings in Selling, Kent =

Civil Parish in Kent, England

Selling is a village and civil parish in the Swale District of Kent, England. It contains 52 listed buildings that are recorded in the National Heritage List for England. Of these one is grade I, one is grade II* and 50 are grade II.

This list is based on the information retrieved online from Historic England.

== Key ==
Grade	Criteria
I	Buildings that are of exceptional interest
II*	Particularly important buildings of more than special interest
II	Buildings that are of special interest

== Listing ==
Name	Grade	Location	Type	Completed (Note: The date given is the date used by Historic England as significant for the initial building or that of an important part in the structure's description.)	Date designated	Grid ref. (Note: The grid reference is based on the British national grid reference system, sometimes known as OSGB36, used by the Ordnance Survey.) Geo-coordinates	Notes	Entry number (Note: The "List Entry Number" is a unique number assigned to each listed building and scheduled monument by Historic England.)	Image	Wikidata
Little Stone Stile Cottages	II				10 November 1986	TR0570555502; 51°15′42″N 0°56′49″E		1344022	Upload Photo	Q26627777
The Old Vicarage	II				24 January 1967	TR0385856749; 51°16′24″N 0°55′16″E		1356593	Upload Photo	Q26639233
Keeper's Cottage	II	Crown Hill			6 September 1985	TR0450355366; 51°15′39″N 0°55′47″E		1068677	Upload Photo	Q26321375
Rose and Crown and Wood Cottage	II	Crown Hill			10 November 1986	TR0419355232; 51°15′35″N 0°55′31″E		1069100	Upload Photo	Q26321802
Grove Cottage	II	Grove Road			10 November 1986	TR0385755813; 51°15′54″N 0°55′14″E		1356145	Upload Photo	Q26638838
Grove House	II	Grove Road			10 November 1986	TR0382955825; 51°15′54″N 0°55′13″E		1069102	Upload Photo	Q26321807
Strawberry Fields	II	Grove Road			10 November 1986	TR0353255765; 51°15′53″N 0°54′58″E		1356142	Upload Photo	Q26638835
Well House	II	Grove Road			10 November 1986	TR0394555715; 51°15′51″N 0°55′19″E		1069101	Upload Photo	Q26321804
Gushmere Court	II	Gushmere			10 November 1986	TR0451957406; 51°16′45″N 0°55′52″E		1356158	Upload Photo	Q26638851
Bailiffs Cottage, Harefield Farm	II	Harefield Farm, Hogben's Hill			10 February 1976	TR0335456638; 51°16′21″N 0°54′50″E		1356133	Upload Photo	Q26638828
Coachman's Cottage	II	Hobgen's Hill			10 February 1976	TR0320556754; 51°16′25″N 0°54′43″E		1344041	Upload Photo	Q26627794
Ye Olde Century	II	Hobgen's Hill			10 February 1976	TR0313856828; 51°16′28″N 0°54′39″E		1069068	Upload Photo	Q26321751
Century Cottage	II	Hogben's Hill			10 February 1976	TR0316156855; 51°16′29″N 0°54′41″E		1069103	Upload Photo	Q26321809
Harefield	II	Hogben's Hill			24 January 1967	TR0331856763; 51°16′25″N 0°54′49″E		1069105	Upload Photo	Q26321813
Stone Cottage	II	Hogben's Hill			10 February 1976	TR0320456834; 51°16′28″N 0°54′43″E		1069104	Upload Photo	Q26321810
Thatch Cottage	II	Hogben's Hill			10 February 1976	TR0320356854; 51°16′29″N 0°54′43″E		1068741	Upload Photo	Q26321436
The Gate Lodge	II	Hogben's Hill			10 February 1976	TR0317356677; 51°16′23″N 0°54′41″E		1069067	Upload Photo	Q26321750
The Green	II	Hogben's Hill			10 February 1976	TR0319356833; 51°16′28″N 0°54′42″E		1068728	Upload Photo	Q26321423
Barn About 30 Metres South of Norham House	II	Norham			10 November 1986	TR0448856352; 51°16′11″N 0°55′48″E		1069070	Upload Photo	Q26321753
Norham Cottage	II	Norham			24 January 1967	TR0445256433; 51°16′13″N 0°55′46″E		1344042	Upload Photo	Q26627795
Norham House	II	Norham			10 November 1986	TR0449156410; 51°16′13″N 0°55′48″E		1069069	Upload Photo	Q26321752
Owen's Court	II	Owen's Court			24 January 1967	TR0274457827; 51°17′01″N 0°54′21″E		1344043	Upload Photo	Q26627796
Saffery Farmhouse	II*	Owen's Court			27 August 1952	TR0297257796; 51°16′59″N 0°54′33″E		1344044	Upload Photo	Q17546557
Well House	II	Owen's Court			10 November 1986	TR0287257865; 51°17′02″N 0°54′28″E		1069071	Upload Photo	Q26321754
Perry Wood Place	II	Perry Wood			8 March 1984	TR0431655782; 51°15′52″N 0°55′38″E		1068882	Upload Photo	Q26321574
Three Beeches	II	Perry Wood			10 November 1986	TR0531055518; 51°15′43″N 0°56′29″E		1069072	Upload Photo	Q26321755
Crown Hill Cottage	II	Perrywood			27 November 2008	TR0421855264; 51°15′36″N 0°55′32″E		1393183	Upload Photo	Q26672365
Barn About 20 Metres North West of Rhode Court	II	Rhode Court			24 January 1967	TR0577156217; 51°16′05″N 0°56′54″E		1068888	Upload Photo	Q26321580
Little Oast	II	Rhode Court			10 November 1986	TR0587556219; 51°16′05″N 0°56′59″E		1069073	Upload Photo	Q26321756
Rhode Court	II	Rhode Court	building		24 January 1967	TR0577356178; 51°16′03″N 0°56′54″E		1344045	Rhode Court More images	Q26627797
Barn 20 Metres West of Little Owen's Court	II	Selling Road			10 November 1986	TR0332658133; 51°17′10″N 0°54′52″E		1069076	Upload Photo	Q26321762
Little Owens Court	II	Selling Road			10 November 1986	TR0333058116; 51°17′09″N 0°54′52″E		1067742	Upload Photo	Q26320539
Forge Cottage	II	Selling Street			10 November 1986	TR0398456497; 51°16′16″N 0°55′22″E		1344049	Upload Photo	Q26627801
Greenways	II	Selling Street			10 November 1986	TR0409256506; 51°16′16″N 0°55′28″E		1069078	Upload Photo	Q26321765
Luton Cottage	II	Selling Street			24 January 1967	TR0405256553; 51°16′18″N 0°55′26″E		1344048	Upload Photo	Q26627800
Luton Cottages	II	Selling Street			10 November 1986	TR0408156499; 51°16′16″N 0°55′27″E		1076975	Upload Photo	Q26343007
Luton House	II	Selling Street			24 January 1967	TR0408656569; 51°16′18″N 0°55′28″E		1356612	Upload Photo	Q26639252
The Village Shop	II	Selling Street			24 January 1967	TR0400856526; 51°16′17″N 0°55′24″E		1069077	Upload Photo	Q26321763
The White Lion Public House	II	Selling Street	pub		24 January 1967	TR0403756534; 51°16′17″N 0°55′25″E		1067724	The White Lion Public House More images	Q26320522
Akhurst Cottage	II	Shepherd's Hill			10 November 1986	TR0332355955; 51°15′59″N 0°54′47″E		1069079	Upload Photo	Q26321766
Akhurst Farmhouse	II	Shepherd's Hill			24 January 1967	TR0326155968; 51°16′00″N 0°54′44″E		1076983	Upload Photo	Q26343033
Shepherd's Hill Farmhouse	II	Shepherd's Hill			24 January 1967	TR0327155802; 51°15′54″N 0°54′44″E		1076956	Upload Photo	Q26342941
Bier House Or Mortuary Chapel 30 Metres South East of Church of St Mary	II	St Mary's Church			10 November 1986	TR0387956805; 51°16′26″N 0°55′18″E		1069074	Upload Photo	Q26321758
Church House	II	St Mary's Church			10 November 1986	TR0380856846; 51°16′27″N 0°55′14″E		1069075	Upload Photo	Q26321760
Church of St Mary	I	St Mary's Church	church building		24 January 1967	TR0383356818; 51°16′27″N 0°55′15″E		1343628	Church of St Mary More images	Q17530141
Gate and Overthrow 20 Metres South of Church of St Mary	II	St Mary's Church			10 November 1986	TR0384256780; 51°16′25″N 0°55′16″E		1067757	Upload Photo	Q26320554
Old Oast Cottage	II	St Mary's Church			24 January 1967	TR0380556790; 51°16′26″N 0°55′14″E		1344046	Upload Photo	Q26627798
Stables and Pump About 10 Metres North East of the Old Vicarage	II	St Mary's Church			10 November 1986	TR0386656767; 51°16′25″N 0°55′17″E		1344047	Upload Photo	Q26627799
Ye Olde Timbers	II	St Mary's Church			24 January 1967	TR0378556840; 51°16′27″N 0°55′13″E		1356566	Upload Photo	Q26639209
1-8, the Square	II	1-8, The Square, Hogben's Hill			10 February 1976	TR0326156685; 51°16′23″N 0°54′46″E		1069106	Upload Photo	Q26321815
Brooke's Croft	II	Vicarage Lane			24 January 1967	TR0432057280; 51°16′41″N 0°55′41″E		1076961	Upload Photo	Q26342960
Trafalgar House	II	Vicarage Lane			24 January 1967	TR0432457213; 51°16′39″N 0°55′41″E		1069080	Upload Photo	Q26321767

== See also ==
- Grade I listed buildings in Kent
- Grade II* listed buildings in Kent

== Sources ==
- Newman, John (2013) [1969], Kent: North-East and East, The Buildings of England, New Haven and London: Yale University Press, ISBN 978-0-300-18506-5
