= Listed buildings in Sittingbourne =

Civil Parish in Kent, England

Sittingbourne is a town and non-civil parish in the Swale District of Kent, England. It contains one grade I, three II*, 90 grade II listed buildings that are recorded in the National Heritage List for England.

This list is based on the information retrieved online from Historic England

== Key ==
Grade	Criteria
I	Buildings that are of exceptional interest
II*	Particularly important buildings of more than special interest
II	Buildings that are of special interest

== Listing ==
Name	Grade	Location	Type	Completed (Note: The date given is the date used by Historic England as significant for the initial building or that of an important part in the structure's description.)	Date designated	Grid ref. (Note: The grid reference is based on the British national grid reference system, sometimes known as OSGB36, used by the Ordnance Survey.) Geo-coordinates	Notes	Entry number (Note: The "List Entry Number" is a unique number assigned to each listed building and scheduled monument by Historic England.)	Image	Wikidata
Cemetery Chapel	II	Bell Road			13 December 1974	TQ9057263057; 51°20′05″N 0°44′04″E		1055793	Upload Photo	Q26307415
Spicer Homes	II	Bell Road			1 April 2009	TQ9064962932; 51°20′01″N 0°44′07″E		1393109	Upload Photo	Q26672297
Wall to Cemetery	II	Bell Road			13 December 1974	TQ9060863050; 51°20′05″N 0°44′06″E		1061079	Upload Photo	Q26314213
46, Bell Road	II	46, Bell Road			13 December 1974	TQ9059663032; 51°20′04″N 0°44′05″E		1366597	Upload Photo	Q26648181
48 and 50, Bell Road	II	48 and 50, Bell Road			13 December 1974	TQ9057062971; 51°20′02″N 0°44′03″E		1344192	Upload Photo	Q26627937
62, Bell Road	II	62, Bell Road			13 December 1974	TQ9050662757; 51°19′55″N 0°44′00″E		1061080	Upload Photo	Q26314214
Fulston Manor Farmhouse	II	84, Bell Road			10 September 1951	TQ9065762646; 51°19′51″N 0°44′07″E		1061038	Upload Photo	Q26314174
Riddles Cottage	II	Borden Lane			10 September 1951	TQ8910863144; 51°20′09″N 0°42′48″E		1344211	Upload Photo	Q26627952
Bramblefield Farmhouse (exluding Outbuildings)	II	Bramblefield Lane, Milton Regis			27 September 1973	TQ9024166168; 51°21′46″N 0°43′53″E		1061040	Upload Photo	Q26314176
Tannery House	II	1 and 2, Chalkwell Road, Milton Regis			10 September 1951	TQ8988263886; 51°20′32″N 0°43′30″E		1344212	Upload Photo	Q26627953
Church of All Saints	II	Church Road, Murston			13 December 1974	TQ9184063970; 51°20′33″N 0°45′11″E		1061041	Upload Photo	Q5116796
Bayford Court	II	Crown Quay Lane			10 September 1951	TQ9115063928; 51°20′32″N 0°44′35″E		1061042	Upload Photo	Q26314178
5, Crown Road	II	5, Crown Road, Milton Regis			10 September 1951	TQ9034664554; 51°20′53″N 0°43′55″E		1061043	Upload Photo	Q26314179
Church of the Holy Trinity	II	Dover Street			27 April 2010	TQ9034763816; 51°20′30″N 0°43′54″E		1393765	Upload Photo	Q26672909
10-14, East Street	II	10-14, East Street			13 December 1974	TQ9103163564; 51°20′21″N 0°44′28″E		1061044	Upload Photo	Q26314180
151, East Street	II	151, East Street			27 September 1973	TQ9140163496; 51°20′18″N 0°44′47″E		1061046	Upload Photo	Q26314182
Tunstall Court	II	Gore Court Road			11 July 1987	TQ8997462770; 51°19′56″N 0°43′32″E		1344266	Upload Photo	Q26628004
Great Grovehurst Farmhouse	II	Grovehurst Road, Milton Regis			10 September 1951	TQ9046166529; 51°21′57″N 0°44′05″E		1057685	Upload Photo	Q26309854
Church of St Michael	II*	High Street			10 September 1951	TQ9093463615; 51°20′22″N 0°44′23″E		1061030	Upload Photo	Q17546200
The Three Hats Inn	II	High Street, Milton Regis			13 December 1974	TQ9035664689; 51°20′58″N 0°43′56″E		1344215	Upload Photo	Q26627956
23, High Street	II	23, High Street			13 December 1974	TQ9090363592; 51°20′22″N 0°44′22″E		1061019	Upload Photo	Q26314157
25, High Street	II	25, High Street			13 December 1974	TQ9088963596; 51°20′22″N 0°44′21″E		1061020	Upload Photo	Q26314158
27 and 27a, High Street	II	27 and 27a, High Street			13 December 1974	TQ9088163594; 51°20′22″N 0°44′21″E		1061021	Upload Photo	Q26314159
29 and 29a, High Street	II	29 and 29a, High Street			13 December 1974	TQ9086663600; 51°20′22″N 0°44′20″E		1061022	Upload Photo	Q26314160
31 and 33, High Street	II	31 and 33, High Street			13 December 1974	TQ9085963600; 51°20′22″N 0°44′20″E		1061023	Upload Photo	Q26314161
32, High Street	II	32, High Street			13 December 1974	TQ9081163633; 51°20′23″N 0°44′17″E		1344243	Upload Photo	Q26627980
35-39, High Street	II	35-39, High Street			10 September 1951	TQ9084363602; 51°20′22″N 0°44′19″E		1061024	Upload Photo	Q26314162
The George Hotel	II	41, High Street			10 September 1951	TQ9081863605; 51°20′22″N 0°44′17″E		1061025	Upload Photo	Q26314163
42, 44 and 44a, High Street	II	42, 44 and 44a, High Street			13 December 1974	TQ9076063645; 51°20′24″N 0°44′15″E		1031821	Upload Photo	Q26283213
43, High Street	II	43, High Street			10 September 1951	TQ9081063607; 51°20′22″N 0°44′17″E		1031922	Upload Photo	Q26283317
44 and 46, High Street	II	44 and 46, High Street, Milton Regis			10 September 1951	TQ9038664512; 51°20′52″N 0°43′57″E		1038931	Upload Photo	Q26290708
45, High Street	II	45, High Street			13 December 1974	TQ9080463610; 51°20′22″N 0°44′17″E		1061026	Upload Photo	Q26314164
46 and 48, High Street	II	46 and 48, High Street			13 December 1974	TQ9074563649; 51°20′24″N 0°44′14″E		1061031	Upload Photo	Q26314168
49 and 51, High Street	II*	49 and 51, High Street			10 September 1951	TQ9078463614; 51°20′23″N 0°44′16″E		1352683	Upload Photo	Q17546586
The Rose Inn	II	50, High Street			12 October 1973	TQ9073263652; 51°20′24″N 0°44′13″E		1031795	Upload Photo	Q26283184
52 and 54, High Street	II	52 and 54, High Street			13 December 1974	TQ9072463654; 51°20′24″N 0°44′13″E		1344244	Upload Photo	Q26627981
52, High Street	II	52, High Street, Milton Regis			10 September 1951	TQ9039164530; 51°20′53″N 0°43′57″E		1344217	Upload Photo	Q26627958
54, High Street	II	54, High Street, Milton Regis			13 December 1974	TQ9039664547; 51°20′53″N 0°43′57″E		1374220	Upload Photo	Q26655112
56 and 58, High Street	II	56 and 58, High Street, Milton Regis			13 December 1974	TQ9039764554; 51°20′53″N 0°43′58″E		1061055	Upload Photo	Q26314191
56, High Street	II	56, High Street			13 December 1974	TQ9072163655; 51°20′24″N 0°44′13″E		1061032	Upload Photo	Q26314169
58, High Street	II	58, High Street			10 September 1951	TQ9071763656; 51°20′24″N 0°44′12″E		1031800	Upload Photo	Q26283189
59 and 61, High Street	II	59 and 61, High Street			10 September 1951	TQ9075463624; 51°20′23″N 0°44′14″E		1061027	Upload Photo	Q26314165
60 and 62, High Street	II	60 and 62, High Street			13 December 1974	TQ9070563660; 51°20′24″N 0°44′12″E		1061033	Upload Photo	Q26314170
Hinds House	II	60, High Street, Milton Regis			10 September 1951	TQ9040064581; 51°20′54″N 0°43′58″E		1344218	Upload Photo	Q26627959
62, High Street	II	62, High Street, Milton Regis			13 December 1974	TQ9039864598; 51°20′55″N 0°43′58″E		1374224	Upload Photo	Q26655115
63 and 65, High Street	II	63 and 65, High Street			10 September 1973	TQ9074863627; 51°20′23″N 0°44′14″E		1344241	Upload Photo	Q26627978
63, High Street	II	63, High Street, Milton Regis			10 September 1951	TQ9038264580; 51°20′54″N 0°43′57″E		1061048	Upload Photo	Q26314184
64 and 66, High Street	II	64 and 66, High Street, Milton Regis			13 December 1974	TQ9039864608; 51°20′55″N 0°43′58″E		1061056	Upload Photo	Q26314192
No 65 Including The Building (former Stables) Adjoining On The South West	II	65, High Street, Milton Regis			10 September 1951	TQ9036464601; 51°20′55″N 0°43′56″E		1345556	Upload Photo	Q26629169
67, High Street	II	67, High Street, Milton Regis			13 December 1974	TQ9037064606; 51°20′55″N 0°43′56″E		1344213	Upload Photo	Q26627954
The Bull Hotel	II	67, High Street			14 September 1970	TQ9072363634; 51°20′23″N 0°44′13″E		1352688	Upload Photo	Q26635674
68 and 70, High Street	II	68 and 70, High Street, Milton Regis			10 September 1951	TQ9039464617; 51°20′55″N 0°43′58″E		1374375	Upload Photo	Q26655256
69, High Street	II	69, High Street			13 December 1974	TQ9071363634; 51°20′23″N 0°44′12″E		1061028	Upload Photo	Q26314166
69, High Street	II	69, High Street, Milton Regis			10 September 1951	TQ9036664614; 51°20′55″N 0°43′56″E		1061049	Upload Photo	Q26314185
71 and 71a, High Street	II	71 and 71a, High Street, Milton Regis			13 December 1974	TQ9036864623; 51°20′56″N 0°43′56″E		1057660	Upload Photo	Q26309830
71 and 73, High Street	II	71 and 73, High Street			13 December 1974	TQ9070363630; 51°20′23″N 0°44′12″E		1344242	Upload Photo	Q26627979
72, High Street	II	72, High Street, Milton Regis			13 December 1974	TQ9039064628; 51°20′56″N 0°43′57″E		1344219	Upload Photo	Q26627960
73 and 73a, High Street	II	73 and 73a, High Street, Milton Regis			10 September 1951	TQ9036564635; 51°20′56″N 0°43′56″E		1344214	Upload Photo	Q26627955
74 and 76, High Street	II	74 and 76, High Street, Milton Regis			13 December 1974	TQ9039264639; 51°20′56″N 0°43′57″E		1061057	Upload Photo	Q26314193
75, High Street	II	75, High Street, Milton Regis			10 September 1951	TQ9036864646; 51°20′56″N 0°43′56″E		1039122	Upload Photo	Q26290903
Brenchley House	II	75 and 77, High Street			10 September 1951	TQ9068863638; 51°20′23″N 0°44′11″E		1031810	Upload Photo	Q26283200
79 and 81, High Street	II	79 and 81, High Street			13 December 1974	TQ9067663639; 51°20′23″N 0°44′10″E		1061029	Upload Photo	Q26314167
79 and 81, High Street	II	79 and 81, High Street, Milton Regis			13 December 1974	TQ9036564650; 51°20′57″N 0°43′56″E		1061050	Upload Photo	Q26314186
80, High Street	II	80, High Street, Milton Regis			13 December 1974	TQ9038964653; 51°20′57″N 0°43′57″E		1038333	Upload Photo	Q26290047
82-86, High Street	II	82-86, High Street, Milton Regis			13 December 1974	TQ9039064661; 51°20′57″N 0°43′57″E		1061058	Upload Photo	Q26314194
83-87 and 87a, High Street	II	83-87 and 87a, High Street, Milton Regis			13 December 1974	TQ9036464663; 51°20′57″N 0°43′56″E		1061051	Upload Photo	Q26314187
88, High Street	II	88, High Street, Milton Regis			10 September 1951	TQ9038564675; 51°20′57″N 0°43′57″E		1344220	Upload Photo	Q26627961
90 and 92, High Street	II	90 and 92, High Street, Milton Regis			13 December 1974	TQ9038364684; 51°20′58″N 0°43′57″E		1038339	Upload Photo	Q26290053
91, High Street	II	91, High Street, Milton Regis			13 December 1974	TQ9035964674; 51°20′57″N 0°43′56″E		1039099	Upload Photo	Q26290879
93, High Street	II	93, High Street			13 December 1974	TQ9060663653; 51°20′24″N 0°44′07″E		1031815	Upload Photo	Q26283206
94, High Street	II	94, High Street, Milton Regis			13 December 1974	TQ9038164695; 51°20′58″N 0°43′57″E		1061059	Upload Photo	Q26314195
95 and 95a, High Street	II	95 and 95a, High Street, Milton Regis			13 December 1974	TQ9035664704; 51°20′58″N 0°43′56″E		1039103	Upload Photo	Q26290883
96 and 98, High Street	II	96 and 98, High Street, Milton Regis			13 December 1974	TQ9038464698; 51°20′58″N 0°43′57″E		1344238	Upload Photo	Q26627976
97 and 97a, High Street	II	97 and 97a, High Street, Milton Regis			30 January 1973	TQ9034764714; 51°20′59″N 0°43′55″E		1061052	Upload Photo	Q26314188
99 and 99a, High Street	II	99 and 99a, High Street, Milton Regis			10 September 1951	TQ9035564733; 51°20′59″N 0°43′56″E		1344216	Upload Photo	Q26627957
100 and 102, High Street	II	100 and 102, High Street, Milton Regis			10 September 1951	TQ9038864711; 51°20′58″N 0°43′57″E		1061017	Upload Photo	Q26314155
104a, High Street	II	104a, High Street, Milton Regis			13 December 1974	TQ9039864726; 51°20′59″N 0°43′58″E		1061018	Upload Photo	Q26314156
Jay's House	II	104, High Street, Milton Regis			10 September 1951	TQ9039464716; 51°20′59″N 0°43′58″E		1344239	Upload Photo	Q26627977
The Court House	II*	110, High Street, Milton Regis			10 September 1951	TQ9037964734; 51°20′59″N 0°43′57″E		1344240	Upload Photo	Q17546578
113 and 115, High Street	II	113 and 115, High Street, Milton Regis			10 September 1951	TQ9035964770; 51°21′00″N 0°43′56″E		1039107	Upload Photo	Q26290888
117, High Street	II	117, High Street, Milton Regis			10 September 1951	TQ9035664779; 51°21′01″N 0°43′56″E		1061053	Upload Photo	Q26314189
191, High Street	II	191, High Street, Milton Regis			13 December 1974	TQ9030864943; 51°21′06″N 0°43′54″E		1061054	Upload Photo	Q26314190
Chilton Manor	II	Highsted Road			13 December 1974	TQ9108462898; 51°19′59″N 0°44′30″E		1031372	Upload Photo	Q26282732
Westfield	II	53, London Road, Milton Regis			13 December 1974	TQ8984763830; 51°20′31″N 0°43′28″E		1344245	Upload Photo	Q26627982
Chalkwell House	II	75, London Road, Milton Regis			13 December 1974	TQ8976763817; 51°20′30″N 0°43′24″E		1061034	Upload Photo	Q26314171
East Hall	II	Murston			10 September 1951	TQ9249064271; 51°20′42″N 0°45′45″E		1344246	Upload Photo	Q26627983
Little Murston Farmhouse	II	Murston			13 December 1974	TQ9331965643; 51°21′25″N 0°46′31″E		1061035	Upload Photo	Q26314172
Parish Church of the Holy Trinity	I	North Street, Milton Regis			10 September 1951	TQ9088865394; 51°21′20″N 0°44′25″E		1061036	Upload Photo	Q17530021
66, North Street	II	66, North Street, Milton Regis			10 September 1951	TQ9059965246; 51°21′16″N 0°44′09″E		1031364	Upload Photo	Q26282724
Quinton Cottage	II	Quinton Road, Milton Regis			13 December 1974	TQ8946665225; 51°21′16″N 0°43′11″E		1344247	Upload Photo	Q26627984
Quinton Farmhouse	II	Quinton Road, Milton Regis			13 December 1974	TQ8937265295; 51°21′19″N 0°43′06″E		1025893	Upload Photo	Q26276822
Sittingbourne Adult Studies College	II	Riddles Road			11 July 1987	TQ8946463004; 51°20′04″N 0°43′06″E		1067533	Upload Photo	Q26320348
Murston House	II	Tonge Road, Murston			13 December 1974	TQ9188863835; 51°20′28″N 0°45′13″E		1061037	Upload Photo	Q26314173
Meres Court with Cottage Attached	II	Murston			10 September 1951	TQ9239164608; 51°20′53″N 0°45′41″E		1031356	Upload Photo	Q26282716

== See also ==
- Grade I listed buildings in Kent
- Grade II* listed buildings in Kent

== Sources ==
- Newman, John (2013) [1969], Kent: North-East and East, The Buildings of England, New Haven and London: Yale University Press, ISBN 978-0-300-18506-5
