= Listed buildings in Norton, Buckland and Stone =

Historic structures in Kent, England

Norton, Buckland and Stone is a village and civil parish in the Swale District of Kent, England. It contains 38 listed buildings that are recorded in the National Heritage List for England. Of these one is grade I, one is grade II* and 36 are grade II.

This list is based on the information retrieved online from Historic England.

== Key ==
Grade	Criteria
I	Buildings that are of exceptional interest
II*	Particularly important buildings of more than special interest
II	Buildings that are of special interest

== Listing ==
Name	Grade	Location	Type	Completed (Note: The date given is the date used by Historic England as significant for the initial building or that of an important part in the structure's description.)	Date designated	Grid ref. (Note: The grid reference is based on the British national grid reference system, sometimes known as OSGB36, used by the Ordnance Survey.) Geo-coordinates	Notes	Entry number (Note: The "List Entry Number" is a unique number assigned to each listed building and scheduled monument by Historic England.)	Image	Wikidata
Bullion Cottage	II	Lewson Street			4 March 1975	TQ9646261265; 51°19′00″N 0°49′04″E		1343962	Upload Photo	Q26627723
Hazel Cottage	II	Lewson Street			4 March 1975	TQ9645561273; 51°19′00″N 0°49′04″E		1069215	Upload Photo	Q26322018
Lewson House	II	Lewson Street			27 August 1952	TQ9628661366; 51°19′03″N 0°48′55″E		1343961	Upload Photo	Q26627722
Myrtle Cottage	II	Lewson Street			4 March 1975	TQ9653061229; 51°18′58″N 0°49′08″E		1069211	Upload Photo	Q26322009
Post Office Cottage	II	Lewson Street			4 March 1975	TQ9648061273; 51°19′00″N 0°49′05″E		1069212	Upload Photo	Q26322011
Thatch Cottage	II	Lewson Street			24 January 1967	TQ9644661309; 51°19′01″N 0°49′03″E		1343960	Upload Photo	Q26627721
The Plough Inn	II	Lewson Street	pub		24 January 1967	TQ9626561413; 51°19′05″N 0°48′54″E		1069214	The Plough Inn More images	Q26322015
Wheelwright's Cottage	II	Lewson Street			28 August 1986	TQ9651661191; 51°18′57″N 0°49′07″E		1069216	Upload Photo	Q26322020
World's End	II	Lewson Street			28 August 1986	TQ9652961386; 51°19′03″N 0°49′08″E		1069213	Upload Photo	Q26322013
Hand Pump 10 Metres West of the Old Farmhouse	II	Lower Road			28 August 1986	TQ9761562636; 51°19′43″N 0°50′06″E		1038537	Upload Photo	Q26290237
Oast and Granary 10 Metres East of Stone Farm	II	Lower Road			28 August 1986	TQ9815862019; 51°19′22″N 0°50′33″E		1343964	Upload Photo	Q26627725
Stables and Granary 25 Metres of the Old Famhouse	II	Lower Road			24 January 1967	TQ9760862665; 51°19′43″N 0°50′06″E		1343963	Upload Photo	Q26627724
Stone Farm	II	Lower Road			24 January 1967	TQ9814462007; 51°19′22″N 0°50′32″E		1374496	Upload Photo	Q26655364
The Old Farmhouse	II	Lower Road			24 January 1967	TQ9762662633; 51°19′42″N 0°50′07″E		1069217	Upload Photo	Q26322022
The Old Rectory	II	Lower Road			27 August 1952	TQ9752062115; 51°19′26″N 0°50′00″E		1038335	Upload Photo	Q26290049
The Ruins of the Church of St Nicholas	II	Lower Road			24 January 1967	TQ9759562611; 51°19′42″N 0°50′05″E		1069218	Upload Photo	Q26322024
Oast House, Newlands	II	Newlands, Lewson Street			22 May 1985	TQ9630762030; 51°19′25″N 0°48′58″E		1039102	Upload Photo	Q26290882
Church of St Mary	I	Norton, Buckland And Stone	church building		24 January 1967	TQ9677661100; 51°18′54″N 0°49′20″E		1069252	Church of St Mary More images	Q17530035
Lime Kiln 30 Metres North of Putt Cottage	II	Norton, Buckland And Stone, Syndale Valley			28 August 1986	TQ9772459986; 51°18′17″N 0°50′07″E		1031798	Upload Photo	Q26283187
Putt Cottage	II	Norton, Buckland And Stone, Syndale Valley			28 August 1986	TQ9769859962; 51°18′16″N 0°50′05″E		1343968	Upload Photo	Q26627729
The Lodge, Norton Court	II	Norton Court, Norton Lane	building		28 August 1986	TQ9675161306; 51°19′01″N 0°49′19″E		1038312	The Lodge, Norton Court More images	Q26290029
Barn at Norton Court Farm at Tq 967 613	II	Norton Lane			28 August 1986	TQ9679961326; 51°19′01″N 0°49′22″E		1343965	Upload Photo	Q26627726
Norton Court Including Courtyard Walls and Outbuildings	II	Norton Lane			27 August 1952	TQ9673861202; 51°18′57″N 0°49′18″E		1069219	Upload Photo	Q26322026
Barbary Farmhouse	II	Provender Lane			27 August 1952	TQ9748461211; 51°18′57″N 0°49′57″E		1374513	Upload Photo	Q26655379
Coachhouse and Stable, 15 Metres West of the Old Rectory	II	15 Metres West Of The Old Rectory, Provender Lane			28 August 1986	TQ9739161265; 51°18′58″N 0°49′52″E		1069222	Upload Photo	Q26322032
Garden Walls of Provender	II	Provender Lane			24 January 1967	TQ9736160844; 51°18′45″N 0°49′50″E		1069221	Upload Photo	Q26322030
Horse Wheel 15 Metres West of Barbary Farmhouse	II	Provender Lane			28 August 1986	TQ9744861201; 51°18′56″N 0°49′55″E		1069220	Upload Photo	Q26322028
Provender	II*	Provender Lane	English country house		27 August 1952	TQ9737960801; 51°18′43″N 0°49′51″E		1374517	Provender More images	Q17546605
Provender Farmhouse	II	Provender Lane			24 January 1967	TQ9734260711; 51°18′41″N 0°49′48″E		1038300	Upload Photo	Q26290016
The Old Rectory	II	Provender Lane			24 January 1967	TQ9741961261; 51°18′58″N 0°49′54″E		1031816	Upload Photo	Q26283207
Whinbourne Cottage	II	Provender Lane			24 January 1967	TQ9709260479; 51°18′33″N 0°49′35″E		1343966	Upload Photo	Q26627727
Little Rushett	II	Rushett Lane			24 January 1967	TQ9702860023; 51°18′19″N 0°49′31″E		1343967	Upload Photo	Q26627728
Barn 30 Metres South East of Stuppington Farmhouse	II	Straight Hill			28 August 1986	TQ9636859120; 51°17′50″N 0°48′55″E		1069224	Upload Photo	Q26322036
Barn 50 Metres South of Stuppington Farmhouse	II	Straight Hill			28 August 1986	TQ9633759102; 51°17′50″N 0°48′53″E		1031793	Upload Photo	Q26283182
Horse Wheel 10 Metres North East of Stuppington Farmhouse	II	Straight Hill			28 August 1986	TQ9639159159; 51°17′52″N 0°48′56″E		1069223	Upload Photo	Q26322034
Stables 20 Metres North West of Stuppington Farmhouse	II	Straight Hill			28 August 1986	TQ9636059177; 51°17′52″N 0°48′55″E		1031826	Upload Photo	Q26283217
Stuppington Farmhouse	II	Straight Hill			28 August 1986	TQ9637659154; 51°17′51″N 0°48′56″E		1376654	Upload Photo	Q26657186

== See also ==
- Grade I listed buildings in Kent
- Grade II* listed buildings in Kent

== Sources ==
- Newman, John (2013) [1969], Kent: North-East and East, The Buildings of England, New Haven and London: Yale University Press, ISBN 978-0-300-18506-5
