= Listed buildings in Tunstall, Kent =

Civil Parish in Kent, England

Tunstall is a village and civil parish in the Swale District of Kent, England. It contains 20 listed buildings that are recorded in the National Heritage List for England. Of these two are grade I and 18 are grade II.

This list is based on the information retrieved online from Historic England .

== Key ==
Grade	Criteria
I	Buildings that are of exceptional interest
II*	Particularly important buildings of more than special interest
II	Buildings that are of special interest

== Listing ==
Name	Grade	Location	Type	Completed (Note: The date given is the date used by Historic England as significant for the initial building or that of an important part in the structure's description.)	Date designated	Grid ref. (Note: The grid reference is based on the British national grid reference system, sometimes known as OSGB36, used by the Ordnance Survey.) Geo-coordinates	Notes	Entry number (Note: The "List Entry Number" is a unique number assigned to each listed building and scheduled monument by Historic England.)	Image	Wikidata
Barn 30 Yards North of Grove End	II	Bredgar Road			27 November 1984	TQ8911361458; 51°19′15″N 0°42′45″E		1115681	Upload Photo	Q26409379
Barn 60 Yards North East of Grove End	II	Bredgar Road			27 November 1984	TQ8915261477; 51°19′15″N 0°42′47″E		1343911	Upload Photo	Q26627678
Grove End	II	Bredgar Road			24 January 1967	TQ8909861387; 51°19′13″N 0°42′44″E		1069352	Upload Photo	Q26322288
Shepherd's Cottage	II	Bredgar Road			27 November 1984	TQ8897361510; 51°19′17″N 0°42′38″E		1115629	Upload Photo	Q26409330
Stables 30 Yards North of Grove End	II	Bredgar Road			27 November 1984	TQ8913261442; 51°19′14″N 0°42′46″E		1069353	Upload Photo	Q26322290
Woodstock Home Farmhouse	II	Broadoak Road			24 January 1967	TQ9011460744; 51°18′51″N 0°43′36″E		1115723	Upload Photo	Q26409419
Monument, Homewood Children, 25 Yards South West of Tunstall Church Tower	II	Homewood Children, 25 Yards South West Of Tunstall Church Tower, Tunstall Road			27 November 1984	TQ8957261879; 51°19′28″N 0°43′10″E		1320371	Upload Photo	Q26606374
Wall, Stables and Dovecot South of Tunstall House	II	Stables And Dovecot South Of Tunstall House, Tunstall Road			27 August 1952	TQ8942561806; 51°19′26″N 0°43′02″E		1320376	Upload Photo	Q26606379
Former Oast, Now Garage 10 Yards South of the Oast	II	Now Garage 10 Yards South Of The Oast, Tunstall Road			27 November 1984	TQ8931861693; 51°19′22″N 0°42′56″E		1069359	Upload Photo	Q26322298
Cedar House	II	Tunstall Road			27 November 1984	TQ8965361858; 51°19′27″N 0°43′14″E		1343912	Upload Photo	Q26627679
Church of St John the Baptist	I	Tunstall Road	church building		24 January 1967	TQ8959061899; 51°19′29″N 0°43′11″E		1069356	Church of St John the Baptist More images	Q17530055
Hales Cottage	II	Tunstall Road			27 November 1984	TQ8968162009; 51°19′32″N 0°43′16″E		1320356	Upload Photo	Q26606361
Hales House	II	Tunstall Road			27 August 1952	TQ8964962016; 51°19′32″N 0°43′14″E		1069355	Upload Photo	Q26322294
Law Family Monument 15 Yards West of Tunstall Church Tower	II	Tunstall Road			27 November 1984	TQ8956361897; 51°19′28″N 0°43′09″E		1343913	Upload Photo	Q26627680
The Coach House	II	Tunstall Road, Sittingbourne, ME10 1YQ			27 November 1984	TQ8967361996; 51°19′32″N 0°43′15″E		1320347	Upload Photo	Q26606355
The Den	II	Tunstall Road			24 January 1967	TQ8943861766; 51°19′24″N 0°43′03″E		1069354	Upload Photo	Q26322292
The Oast	II	Tunstall Road			27 November 1984	TQ8932761710; 51°19′23″N 0°42′57″E		1320384	Upload Photo	Q26606386
The Village School	II	Tunstall Road			27 November 1984	TQ8934561737; 51°19′24″N 0°42′58″E		1069358	Upload Photo	Q26322296
Tunstall House	I	Tunstall Road	building		27 August 1952	TQ8946161825; 51°19′26″N 0°43′04″E		1069357	Tunstall House More images	Q17530058
Tunstall House Cottage	II	Tunstall Road			24 January 1967	TQ8947861789; 51°19′25″N 0°43′05″E		1320331	Upload Photo	Q26606341

== See also ==
- Grade I listed buildings in Kent
- Grade II* listed buildings in Kent

== Sources ==
- Newman, John (2013) [1969], Kent: North-East and East, The Buildings of England, New Haven and London: Yale University Press, ISBN 978-0-300-18506-5
