= Listed buildings in Sheerness =

Civil Parish in Kent, England

Sheerness is a town and civil parish in the Swale District of Kent, England. It contains 51 listed buildings that are recorded in the National Heritage List for England. Of these one is grade I, eight are grade II* and 42 are grade II.

This list is based on the information retrieved online from Historic England.

== Key ==
| Grade | Criteria |
|---|---|
| I | Buildings that are of exceptional interest |
| II* | Particularly important buildings of more than special interest |
| II | Buildings that are of special interest |

== Listing ==
| Name | Grade | Location | Type | Completed (Note: The date given is the date used by Historic England as significant for the initial building or that of an important part in the structure's description.) | Date designated | Grid ref. (Note: The grid reference is based on the British national grid reference system, sometimes known as OSGB36, used by the Ordnance Survey.) Geo-coordinates | Notes | Entry number (Note: The "List Entry Number" is a unique number assigned to each listed building and scheduled monument by Historic England.) | Image | Wikidata |
|---|---|---|---|---|---|---|---|---|---|---|
| Walls and Gates of the Boat Basin, Docks Number 4 5 and Slipway | II* | Anchor Lane, Sheerness Dockyard | | | 15 March 1977 | TQ9085375334; 51°26′41″N 0°44′42″E | | 1255552 | Upload Photo | Q17546398 |
| Beach House | II | Beach Street, Mile Town | | | 30 June 1978 | TQ9194574982; 51°26′29″N 0°45′38″E | | 1259822 | Upload Photo | Q26550907 |
| 1-23, the Broadway | II | 1 and 3, Crescent, Mile Town | | | 30 June 1978 | TQ9210374851; 51°26′24″N 0°45′46″E | | 1259823 | Upload Photo | Q26550908 |
| Clock Tower | II | Crescent, Mile Town | clock tower | | 30 June 1978 | TQ9206574828; 51°26′24″N 0°45′44″E | | 1258071 | Clock Tower More images | Q26549357 |
| Boundary Wall Extends from Main Gate Round South and East Sides of Former Dockyard | II | Garrison Road, Sheerness Dockyard | | | 15 March 1977 | TQ9134575068; 51°26′32″N 0°45′07″E | | 1259030 | Upload Photo | Q26550194 |
| Boundary Walls Extends from Main Gate Along North and North East Side | II | Garrison Road, Sheerness Dockyard | | | 13 August 1999 | TQ9093875425; 51°26′44″N 0°44′47″E | | 1244508 | Upload Photo | Q26537124 |
| Former Royal Dockyard Church and Attached Wall and Railings | II* | Garrison Road, Sheerness Dockyard | architectural structure | | 7 December 1966 | TQ9146175154; 51°26′35″N 0°45′13″E | | 1273239 | Former Royal Dockyard Church and Attached Wall and Railings More images | Q17546445 |
| Former Working Mast House Building Number 26 | II* | Great Basin Road, Sheerness Dockyard | | | 13 August 1999 | TQ9087474922; 51°26′28″N 0°44′42″E | | 1244509 | Upload Photo | Q17546393 |
| 41, High Street | II | 41, High Street, Blue Town | | | 12 March 1976 | TQ9127475034; 51°26′31″N 0°45′03″E | | 1273518 | Upload Photo | Q26563256 |
| 53, High Street | II | 53, High Street, Blue Town | | | 30 June 1978 | TQ9120675036; 51°26′31″N 0°45′00″E | | 1273519 | Upload Photo | Q26563257 |
| 95, High Street | II | 95, High Street, Mile Town | | | 30 June 1978 | TQ9209174751; 51°26′21″N 0°45′45″E | | 1258226 | Upload Photo | Q26549486 |
| 97, High Street (see Details for Further Address Information) | II | 97, High Street, Mile Town | | | 30 June 1978 | TQ9210074744; 51°26′21″N 0°45′45″E | | 1258227 | Upload Photo | Q26549487 |
| Banks Terrace | II | 266-274, High Street, Mile Town | | | 30 June 1978 | TQ9239374433; 51°26′10″N 0°46′00″E | | 1258331 | Upload Photo | Q26549579 |
| Former County Court | II | High Street, Blue Town | | | 17 February 1978 | TQ9109875026; 51°26′31″N 0°44′54″E | | 1258225 | Upload Photo | Q26549485 |
| Railings to South Side of Green to East of Naval Terrace | II | High Street, Sheerness Dockyard | | | 15 March 1977 | TQ9149775084; 51°26′33″N 0°45′15″E | | 1258880 | Upload Photo | Q26550070 |
| Red Lion Public House | II | High Street, Blue Town | pub | | 30 June 1978 | TQ9117775026; 51°26′31″N 0°44′58″E | | 1258224 | Red Lion Public House More images | Q26549484 |
| Remains of Cornmill to Rear of Number 111 | II | High Street, Mile Town | smock mill | | 30 June 1978 | TQ9210274702; 51°26′19″N 0°45′45″E | | 1258330 | Remains of Cornmill to Rear of Number 111 More images | Q5599574 |
| Bethel Chapel Sunday School | II | Hope Street, Mile Town | | | 30 June 1978 | TQ9199674814; 51°26′23″N 0°45′40″E | | 1273419 | Upload Photo | Q26563164 |
| Former Military Hospital | II | Isle Of Sheppy | | | 24 August 2016 | TQ9159674920; 51°26′27″N 0°45′20″E | | 1436845 | Upload Photo | Q66477731 |
| Building Number 86 | II | Jetty Road, Sheerness Dockyard | | | 25 April 1994 | TQ9095675374; 51°26′43″N 0°44′47″E | | 1243082 | Upload Photo | Q26535790 |
| Former North Saw Pits Building Number 84 | II* | Jetty Road, Sheerness Dockyard | | | 25 April 1994 | TQ9098775361; 51°26′42″N 0°44′49″E | | 1243244 | Upload Photo | Q17546388 |
| South Gate House | II | 1 and 2, Main Road, Sheerness Dockyard | | | 15 March 1977 | TQ9132375250; 51°26′38″N 0°45′06″E | | 1273185 | Upload Photo | Q26562958 |
| Former Sawmill, Building Numbers 105, 106 and 107 | II | 105, 106 and 107, Main Road | | | 13 August 1999 | TQ9115775249; 51°26′38″N 0°44′58″E | | 1244510 | Upload Photo | Q26537125 |
| Archway House Building Number 23 | II* | Main Road, Sheerness Dockyard | | | 1 August 1968 | TQ9106275137; 51°26′35″N 0°44′52″E | | 1258986 | Upload Photo | Q17546434 |
| Dockyard Cottage and Attached Garden Wall and Basemnet Railings | II | Main Road, Sheerness Dockyard | | | 15 March 1977 | TQ9133875226; 51°26′37″N 0°45′07″E | | 1273184 | Upload Photo | Q26562957 |
| Former Pay Office Building Number 104 | II | Main Road, Sheerness Dockyard | | | 18 January 1972 | TQ9120375234; 51°26′38″N 0°45′00″E | | 1258985 | Upload Photo | Q26550158 |
| North Gate House | II | Main Road, Sheerness Dockyard | | | 15 March 1977 | TQ9129875260; 51°26′38″N 0°45′05″E | | 1258983 | Upload Photo | Q26550157 |
| Wall Extending Approximately 70 Metres Enclosing Garden to South of Dockyard House | II | Main Road, Sheerness Dockyard | | | 15 March 1977 | TQ9138675152; 51°26′35″N 0°45′09″E | | 1273213 | Upload Photo | Q26562980 |
| Neptune Terrace | II | 1-10, Marine Parade, Marine Town | | | 30 June 1978 | TQ9259274937; 51°26′26″N 0°46′11″E | | 1258778 | Upload Photo | Q26549981 |
| Cheyney House the Rock House | II | 126, Marine Parade, Marine Town | | | 2 March 1950 | TQ9324274936; 51°26′26″N 0°46′45″E | | 1273262 | Upload Photo | Q26563022 |
| Grotto Shaped Folly to North East of Ship on Shore Public House | II | Marine Parade, Marine Town | | | 30 June 1978 | TQ9354674895; 51°26′24″N 0°47′00″E | | 1273263 | Upload Photo | Q26563023 |
| Stable Block to South West of Number 124 | II | Marine Parade, Marine Town | | | 2 March 1950 | TQ9323274932; 51°26′25″N 0°46′44″E | | 1258794 | Upload Photo | Q26549996 |
| Numbers 1 to 15 and Attached Railings | II* | Regency Close, Sheerness Dockyard | | | 15 March 1977 | TQ9135175102; 51°26′33″N 0°45′07″E | | 1258881 | Upload Photo | Q17546424 |
| Wall Extending Approximately 85 Metres Enclosing Garden to North of Numbers 1 to 15 | II | Regency Close, Sheerness Dockyard | | | 15 March 1977 | TQ9139375141; 51°26′34″N 0°45′10″E | | 1258882 | Upload Photo | Q26550071 |
| 6-10, Rose Street | II | 6-10, Rose Street, Mile Town | | | 27 February 1977 | TQ9204874776; 51°26′22″N 0°45′43″E | | 1258876 | Upload Photo | Q26550067 |
| Garrison Point Fort | II | Sheerness Docks | fort | | 15 March 1977 | TQ9078475544; 51°26′48″N 0°44′39″E | | 1259029 | Garrison Point Fort More images | Q5524054 |
| Former Stables to Rear of Dockyard Cottage | II | Sheerness Dockyard | | | 15 March 1977 | TQ9135875221; 51°26′37″N 0°45′08″E | | 1258982 | Upload Photo | Q26550156 |
| King William Lion Monument to West of Medway Port Authority Offices | II | Sheerness Dockyard | | | 15 March 1977 | TQ9133375188; 51°26′36″N 0°45′07″E | | 1258952 | Upload Photo | Q26550129 |
| Medway Ports Authority Offices (dockyard House) | II* | Sheerness Dockyard | | | 15 March 1977 | TQ9134775179; 51°26′36″N 0°45′07″E | | 1258883 | Upload Photo | Q17546429 |
| Shed Number 78 the Boat Store Building Number 78 | I | Sheerness Dockyard | architectural structure | | 21 June 1962 | TQ9088875297; 51°26′40″N 0°44′44″E | | 1273160 | Shed Number 78 the Boat Store Building Number 78 More images | Q17530099 |
| 4-22, the Broadway | II | 4-22, The Broadway | | | 30 June 1978 | TQ9211674833; 51°26′24″N 0°45′46″E | | 1258038 | Upload Photo | Q26549332 |
| Memorial to Thomas Stuteley in Holy Trinity Churchyard | II | The Broadway, Mile Town | | | 30 June 1978 | TQ9217074848; 51°26′24″N 0°45′49″E | | 1258056 | Upload Photo | Q26549345 |
| Parish Church of the Holy Trinity | II | The Broadway, Mile Town | church building | | 30 June 1978 | TQ9218474827; 51°26′23″N 0°45′50″E | | 1242870 | Parish Church of the Holy Trinity More images | Q26535595 |
| Remains of Windmill in Grounds of Seaview Hotel | II | The Broadway, Mile Town | | | 30 June 1978 | TQ9245274945; 51°26′27″N 0°46′04″E | | 1242981 | Upload Photo | Q26535698 |
| Roman Catholic Church of St Henry and St Elizabeth | II | The Broadway, Mile Town | church building | | 30 June 1978 | TQ9249074940; 51°26′27″N 0°46′06″E | | 1242869 | Roman Catholic Church of St Henry and St Elizabeth More images | Q26535594 |
| 3, Union Street | II | 3, Union Street, Blue Town | | | 30 June 1978 | TQ9120674979; 51°26′29″N 0°45′00″E | | 1273161 | Upload Photo | Q26562937 |
| A G Smith and Sons Depository | II | Union Street, Blue Town | | | 30 June 1978 | TQ9120274992; 51°26′30″N 0°44′59″E | | 1259031 | Upload Photo | Q26550195 |
| Numbers 1 to 8 Attached Basement Railings, Walls, Coach House and Stables | II* | Naval Terrace, Sheerness Dockyard | | | 15 March 1977 | TQ9147475086; 51°26′33″N 0°45′14″E | | 1258879 | Upload Photo | Q17546418 |
| The Royal Fountain Hotel | II | 15, West Street, Blue Town | | | 2 March 1950 | TQ9110974944; 51°26′28″N 0°44′54″E | | 1243144 | Upload Photo | Q26535845 |
| Outbuilding to Rear of the Royal Fountain Hotel | II | West Street, Blue Town | | | 30 June 1978 | TQ9112474950; 51°26′29″N 0°44′55″E | | 1243077 | Upload Photo | Q26535785 |

== See also ==
- Grade I listed buildings in Kent
- Grade II* listed buildings in Kent

== Sources ==
- Newman, John (2013) [1969], Kent: North-East and East, The Buildings of England, New Haven and London: Yale University Press, ISBN 978-0-300-18506-5
