= Listed buildings in Badlesmere =

Civil Parish in Kent, England

Badlesmere is a village and civil parish in the Swale District of Kent, England. It contains 18 listed buildings that are recorded in the National Heritage List for England. Of these one is grade II* and 17 are grade II.

This list is based on the information retrieved online from Historic England.

== Key ==
Grade	Criteria
I	Buildings that are of exceptional interest
II*	Particularly important buildings of more than special interest
II	Buildings that are of special interest

== Listing ==
Name	Grade	Location	Type	Completed (Note: The date given is the date used by Historic England as significant for the initial building or that of an important part in the structure's description.)	Date designated	Grid ref. (Note: The grid reference is based on the British national grid reference system, sometimes known as OSGB36, used by the Ordnance Survey.) Geo-coordinates	Notes	Entry number (Note: The "List Entry Number" is a unique number assigned to each listed building and scheduled monument by Historic England.)	Image	Wikidata
Badlesmere Court	II				24 January 1967	TR0141755045; 51°15′32″N 0°53′07″E		1069923	Upload Photo	Q26323346
Beacon Hill House	II				24 January 1967	TR0160853531; 51°14′43″N 0°53′14″E		1372253	Upload Photo	Q26653381
Church of St Leonard	II*		church building		24 January 1967	TR0138755096; 51°15′34″N 0°53′06″E		1069922	Church of St Leonard More images	Q17546327
Green Edge	II				10 November 1986	TR0089853983; 51°14′59″N 0°52′38″E		1054709	Upload Photo	Q26306367
Halls Bottom Cottage	II				10 November 1986	TR0237454154; 51°15′02″N 0°53′55″E		1069924	Upload Photo	Q26323348
Stringmans Farmhouse	II				24 January 1967	TR0253954326; 51°15′08″N 0°54′04″E		1363414	Upload Photo	Q26645241
Orchard Cottage	II	Ashford Road			10 November 1986	TR0082054535; 51°15′17″N 0°52′35″E		1069081	Upload Photo	Q26321769
Waterditch Cottage	II	Ashford Road			10 November 1986	TR0078054914; 51°15′29″N 0°52′34″E		1076969	Upload Photo	Q26342986
Barn 10 Metres East of Colleys Cottage	II	Badlesmere Lees			10 November 1986	TR0107654016; 51°14′59″N 0°52′48″E		1054702	Upload Photo	Q26306360
Colleys Cottage	II	Badlesmere Lees			10 November 1986	TR0107154029; 51°15′00″N 0°52′47″E		1069926	Upload Photo	Q26323352
Colleys Farmhouse	II	Badlesmere Lees			10 November 1986	TR0111053999; 51°14′59″N 0°52′49″E		1069927	Upload Photo	Q26323354
Forge Cottage	II	Badlesmere Lees			10 November 1986	TR0090554228; 51°15′07″N 0°52′39″E		1069925	Upload Photo	Q26323350
Red Lion	II	Badlesmere Lees	pub		10 November 1986	TR0086453936; 51°14′57″N 0°52′36″E		1069928	Red Lion More images	Q26323355
Harrow House	II	Boundgate			10 November 1986	TR0094153112; 51°14′30″N 0°52′39″E		1069930	Upload Photo	Q26323360
Barn 30 Metres West of Woods Court	II	Fisher Street			10 November 1986	TR0257854616; 51°15′17″N 0°54′06″E		1069931	Upload Photo	Q26323362
Fisher Street Farmhouse	II	Fisher Street			24 January 1967	TR0280054429; 51°15′11″N 0°54′17″E		1054032	Upload Photo	Q26305717
Woods Court	II	Fisher Street			10 November 1986	TR0261754632; 51°15′17″N 0°54′08″E		1054748	Upload Photo	Q26306407

== See also ==
- Grade I listed buildings in Kent
- Grade II* listed buildings in Kent

== Sources ==
- Newman, John (2013) [1969], Kent: North-East and East, The Buildings of England, New Haven and London: Yale University Press, ISBN 978-0-300-18506-5
