= Listed buildings in Upchurch =

Civil Parish in Kent, England

Upchurch is a village and civil parish in the Swale District of Kent, England. It contains nine listed buildings that are recorded in the National Heritage List for England. Of these one is grade I, one is grade II* and seven are grade II.

This list is based on the information retrieved online from Historic England .

== Key ==
Grade	Criteria
I	Buildings that are of exceptional interest
II*	Particularly important buildings of more than special interest
II	Buildings that are of special interest

== Listing ==
Name	Grade	Location	Type	Completed (Note: The date given is the date used by Historic England as significant for the initial building or that of an important part in the structure's description.)	Date designated	Grid ref. (Note: The grid reference is based on the British national grid reference system, sometimes known as OSGB36, used by the Ordnance Survey.) Geo-coordinates	Notes	Entry number (Note: The "List Entry Number" is a unique number assigned to each listed building and scheduled monument by Historic England.)	Image	Wikidata
Chestnut Cottages	II				27 November 1984	TQ8466168936; 51°23′22″N 0°39′10″E		1069319	Upload Photo	Q26322207
Breach Farmhouse	II	Breach Lane			27 November 1984	TQ8479365617; 51°21′34″N 0°39′10″E		1115508	Upload Photo	Q26409229
Breach House	II	Breach Lane			27 November 1984	TQ8475565618; 51°21′34″N 0°39′08″E		1069317	Upload Photo	Q26322204
Gore Farmhouse	II*	Gore Farm Lane			27 November 1984	TQ8435666516; 51°22′04″N 0°38′49″E		1069318	Upload Photo	Q17546267
Barn 15 Yards North of Ham Green Farmhouse	II	Ham Green			27 November 1984	TQ8474268851; 51°23′19″N 0°39′14″E		1069320	Upload Photo	Q26322209
Holywell Cottages	II	1-2, Holywell Lane			27 November 1984	TQ8501667075; 51°22′21″N 0°39′24″E		1069321	Upload Photo	Q26322211
Holywell Farmhouse	II	Holywell Lane			27 November 1984	TQ8504967030; 51°22′20″N 0°39′26″E		1343933	Upload Photo	Q26627696
Church of St. Mary the Virgin	I	Horsham Lane	church building		24 January 1967	TQ8436867499; 51°22′36″N 0°38′52″E		1343934	Church of St. Mary the Virgin More images	Q17530151
Horsham Farmhouse	II	Horsham Lane			27 November 1984	TQ8389967554; 51°22′38″N 0°38′28″E		1069322	Upload Photo	Q26322213

== See also ==
- Grade I listed buildings in Kent
- Grade II* listed buildings in Kent

== Sources ==
- Newman, John (2013) [1969], Kent: North-East and East, The Buildings of England, New Haven and London: Yale University Press, ISBN 978-0-300-18506-5
