= Listed buildings in Newington, Swale =

Historic structures in Kent, England

Newington is a village and civil parish in the Swale District of Kent, England. It contains 24 listed buildings that are recorded in the National Heritage List for England. Of these one is grade I, one is grade II* and 22 are grade II.

This list is based on the information retrieved online from Historic England.

== Key ==
Grade	Criteria
I	Buildings that are of exceptional interest
II*	Particularly important buildings of more than special interest
II	Buildings that are of special interest

== Listing ==
Name	Grade	Location	Type	Completed (Note: The date given is the date used by Historic England as significant for the initial building or that of an important part in the structure's description.)	Date designated	Grid ref. (Note: The grid reference is based on the British national grid reference system, sometimes known as OSGB36, used by the Ordnance Survey.) Geo-coordinates	Notes	Entry number (Note: The "List Entry Number" is a unique number assigned to each listed building and scheduled monument by Historic England.)	Image	Wikidata
Wormdale Farm House	II				24 January 1967	TQ8585363573; 51°20′27″N 0°40′01″E		1115705	Upload Photo	Q26409403
Barn 20 Yards South West of Nunwell Farmhouse	II	Bull Lane			27 November 1984	TQ8472363262; 51°20′18″N 0°39′02″E		1069345	Upload Photo	Q26322261
Chesley House	II	Bull Lane			24 January 1967	TQ8516263424; 51°20′23″N 0°39′25″E		1069344	Upload Photo	Q26322258
Nunwell Farmhouse	II	Bull Lane			27 November 1984	TQ8472663288; 51°20′19″N 0°39′02″E		1343905	Upload Photo	Q26627672
Thrognall	II	Bull Lane			24 January 1967	TQ8520563305; 51°20′19″N 0°39′27″E		1343904	Upload Photo	Q26627671
Newington Manor	II*	Callaways Lane			27 August 1952	TQ8576264525; 51°20′58″N 0°39′58″E		1320112	Upload Photo	Q26263500
Church Farmhouse	II	Church Lane			27 November 1984	TQ8613665305; 51°21′23″N 0°40′19″E		1116065	Upload Photo	Q26409723
Church of St Mary	I	Church Lane	church building		24 January 1967	TQ8622965341; 51°21′24″N 0°40′24″E		1069347	Church of St Mary More images	Q17530052
Oast House (adjacent to Church Farmhouse)	II	Church Lane			27 November 1984	TQ8613465289; 51°21′22″N 0°40′19″E		1343906	Upload Photo	Q26627673
The Holly Bank	II	Church Lane			25 October 1955	TQ8599764933; 51°21′11″N 0°40′11″E		1069346	Upload Photo	Q26322278
Bog Farm House	II	Halstow Road			24 November 1984	TQ8610365767; 51°21′38″N 0°40′18″E		1320262	Upload Photo	Q26606282
45 and 47, High Street	II	45 and 47, High Street			27 November 1984	TQ8590764808; 51°21′07″N 0°40′06″E		1069349	Upload Photo	Q26322282
57, High Street	II	57, High Street			24 January 1967	TQ8596364792; 51°21′06″N 0°40′09″E		1115738	Upload Photo	Q26409433
66, High Street	II	66, High Street			19 October 1978	TQ8599764768; 51°21′06″N 0°40′11″E		1320267	Upload Photo	Q26606286
Allsworth's Shop	II	High Street			27 November 1984	TQ8595164797; 51°21′07″N 0°40′08″E		1343908	Upload Photo	Q26627675
George Inn	II	High Street			24 January 1967	TQ8592164806; 51°21′07″N 0°40′07″E		1320295	Upload Photo	Q26606309
Lion House	II	High Street			27 August 1952	TQ8609464734; 51°21′04″N 0°40′16″E		1343907	Upload Photo	Q26627674
Milestone	II	High Street			27 November 1984	TQ8618764728; 51°21′04″N 0°40′21″E		1069350	Upload Photo	Q26322284
The Bull Public House	II	High Street	pub		27 November 1984	TQ8584864803; 51°21′07″N 0°40′03″E		1115725	The Bull Public House More images	Q26409421
The Holme	II	56, High Street			24 January 1967	TQ8593864780; 51°21′06″N 0°40′08″E		1069348	Upload Photo	Q26322280
Ellens Place	II	5 and 6, London Road			27 November 1984	TQ8646064639; 51°21′01″N 0°40′34″E		1343909	Upload Photo	Q26627676
Pond Farmhouse	II	London Road			24 January 1967	TQ8544564895; 51°21′10″N 0°39′43″E		1320298	Upload Photo	Q26606312
Parsonage Farm	II	School Road			24 May 1973	TQ8598765347; 51°21′24″N 0°40′11″E		1069351	Upload Photo	Q26322286
Barns 50 Yards South of Wormdale Farm House	II	Wormdale			27 November 1984	TQ8586163521; 51°20′25″N 0°40′01″E		1343910	Upload Photo	Q26627677

== See also ==
- Grade I listed buildings in Kent
- Grade II* listed buildings in Kent

== Sources ==
- Newman, John (2013) [1969], Kent: North-East and East, The Buildings of England, New Haven and London: Yale University Press, ISBN 978-0-300-18506-5
