= Listed buildings in Eastchurch =

Historic structures in Kent, England

Eastchurch is a village and civil parish in the Swale District of Kent, England. It contains 15 listed buildings that are recorded in the National Heritage List for England. Of these one is grade I, two are grade II* and twelve are grade II.

This list is based on the information retrieved online from Historic England.

== Key ==
Grade	Criteria
I	Buildings that are of exceptional interest
II*	Particularly important buildings of more than special interest
II	Buildings that are of special interest

== Listing ==
Name	Grade	Location	Type	Completed (Note: The date given is the date used by Historic England as significant for the initial building or that of an important part in the structure's description.)	Date designated	Grid ref. (Note: The grid reference is based on the British national grid reference system, sometimes known as OSGB36, used by the Ordnance Survey.) Geo-coordinates	Notes	Entry number (Note: The "List Entry Number" is a unique number assigned to each listed building and scheduled monument by Historic England.)	Image	Wikidata
Garden Walls to Parsonage Farmhouse	II	Church Road			30 June 1978	TQ9863270967; 51°24′11″N 0°51′16″E		1259758	Upload Photo	Q26550851
Parsonage Farmhouse	II	Church Road			14 May 1952	TQ9863170925; 51°24′09″N 0°51′15″E		1258070	Upload Photo	Q26549356
22 and 24, High Street	II	22 and 24, High Street	building		30 June 1978	TQ9912171409; 51°24′24″N 0°51′42″E		1273521	22 and 24, High Street More images	Q26563258
Church of All Saints	I	High Street	church building		27 June 1963	TQ9883571422; 51°24′25″N 0°51′27″E		1273520	Church of All Saints More images	Q17530105
Rectory	II	High Street			5 December 1986	TQ9879571439; 51°24′26″N 0°51′25″E		1273063	Upload Photo	Q26562848
Four Hangars	II	Hmp Stanford Hill (former Raf Eastchurch)			1 December 2005	TQ9799269831; 51°23′35″N 0°50′40″E		1391502	Upload Photo	Q26670862
Memorial to 'the Home of Aviation'	II*	Junction Of High Street And Church Road, ME12 4DE	memorial		30 June 1978	TQ9883271385; 51°24′24″N 0°51′27″E		1258069	Memorial to 'the Home of Aviation' More images	Q26549355
The Garden Walls of Shurland Hall Or Castle	II	Leysdown Road			27 June 1963	TQ9944171498; 51°24′27″N 0°51′58″E		1273309	Upload Photo	Q26563064
The Ruins of Shurland Hall Or Castle	II*	Leysdown Road	architectural structure		14 May 1952	TQ9942171550; 51°24′28″N 0°51′58″E		1258505	The Ruins of Shurland Hall Or Castle More images	Q17546412
Connetts	II	Plough Road			30 June 1978	TQ9875672549; 51°25′02″N 0°51′25″E		1258797	Upload Photo	Q26549999
Trouts	II	Plough Road			30 June 1978	TQ9918972384; 51°24′56″N 0°51′47″E		1258866	Upload Photo	Q26550059
2, Warden Road	II	2, Warden Road			30 June 1978	TQ9886971460; 51°24′26″N 0°51′29″E		1273127	Upload Photo	Q26562909
Fletcher Battery	II	Warden Road, Sheerness, ME12 4ET			31 August 2017	TR0014372828; 51°25′09″N 0°52′37″E		1445810	Upload Photo	Q66478734
House Within Grounds of Warden Manor and in Same Occupancy	II	Warden Road			30 June 1978	TR0161972410; 51°24′53″N 0°53′53″E		1259032	Upload Photo	Q26550196
Warden Manor	II	Warden Road			27 June 1963	TR0158572393; 51°24′53″N 0°53′51″E		1273162	Upload Photo	Q26562938

== See also ==
- Grade I listed buildings in Kent
- Grade II* listed buildings in Kent

== Sources ==
- Newman, John (2013) [1969], Kent: North-East and East, The Buildings of England, New Haven and London: Yale University Press, ISBN 978-0-300-18506-5
