= Leaveland =

Hamlet in Kent, England

Coordinates: 51.2575°N 0.872°E

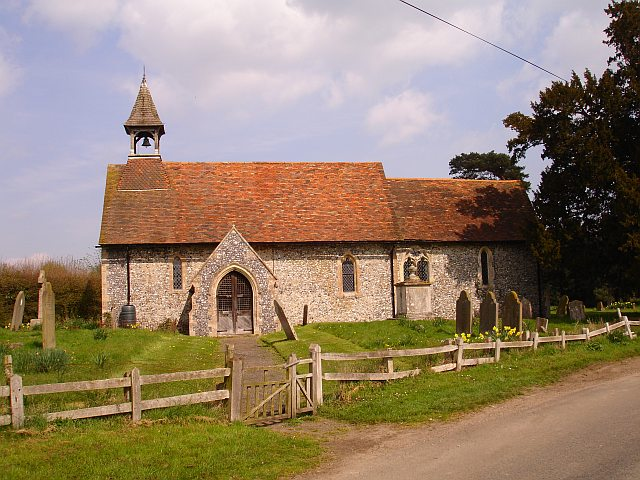
- St Laurence’s Church, Leaveland

- Location within Kent
- Population: 100 (2011 Census)
- Civil parish: Sheldwich, Badlesmere and Leaveland.
- District: Swale
- Shire county: Kent
- Region: South East
- Country: England
- Sovereign state: United Kingdom
- Post town: Faversham
- Postcode district: ME13 0
- Police: Kent
- Fire: Kent
- Ambulance: South East Coast
- UK Parliament: Faversham and Mid Kent

Leaveland is a hamlet and civil parish located in the Swale borough of Kent in southeast England. In terms of topography, it is described as a "village surrounded by inhabited countryside", and is situated mostly on high ground. It is located 5 miles south of Faversham and west of Badlesmere, and on or close to the A251. The closest railway station to the area is Selling, which is just over three miles away, although Faversham station is more accessible and offers better services. The closest estuary is The Swale which separates the Isle of Sheppey from mainland Kent, and flows to the north of Faversham Creek. Leaveland itself covers an area of 1.5 km^{2} and lies entirely within the Kent Downs Area of Outstanding Natural Beauty.

According to the 2011 Census there were 54 males and 46 females living in the parish.

Leaveland as a civil parish is too small to have its own parish council, therefore Sheldwich, Badlesmere and Leaveland have a combined parish council (their total population is 759), consisting of 8 members. They have monthly meetings where by they deal with local issues, help aid council spending, and provide information to organisations who operate in the area. Leaveland is also part of Swale Borough Council, as part of the 4 towns in the borough. These include Faversham, Sittingbourne, Sheerness and Queenborough. The Borough currently has 47 councillors, no one party holds a majority (2019 elections).

== History ==
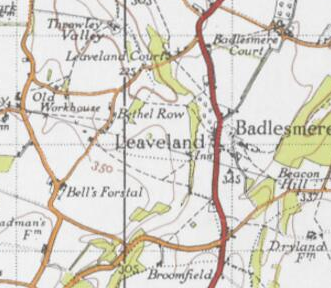
20th-century Ordnance Survey map of Leaveland, Kent and surrounding areas

In the 1870s, Leaveland was described as:

A parish in Faversham district, Kent; 3¼ miles SW of Selling r. station, and 4¼ S by W of Faversham. Post town, Badlesmere, under Faversham. Acres, 372. Real property, £685. Pop., 94. Houses, 23. The property is divided among a few. The manor and much of the land belong to Lord Sondes. The living is a rectory, annexed to the rectory of Badlesmere, in the diocese of Canterbury. The church has a wooden turret, and is good.

The name Leaveland comes from the Old English '"land' meaning "land, an estate", this is linked with a warlords name; so "Leofas land". This is one of the main reasons for the dominance of agricultural practices which take place here.

Leaveland is mentioned in the Domesday Book of 1086 as "Levant", in the hundred of Faversham. There was a total population of 3 households, and 1 unchanged tax units, with 2 villagers, with 1 small holder. There is 1 lord’s plough team, and 1 men's plough team and other resources include a woodland 5 swine render. The overlord in 1066 was the Archbishop of Canterbury, and the value of the area to the lord in 1070 was £1.5s.

=== St Laurence Church ===
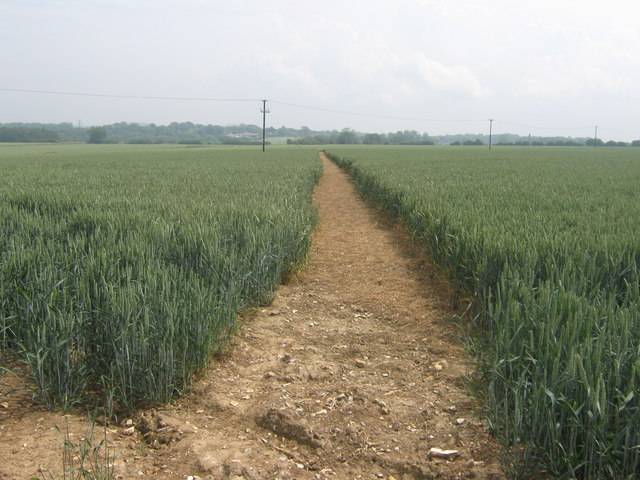
Footpath to Leaveland

St Laurence Church is the parish church (dedicated to Saint Laurence) and a Grade II listed building. Its described as "delightfully small, simple and still". The church was built and consecrated in 1222, and was restored in the 18th century with the addition of a vestry. It is located on the eastern side of the parish, with the court-lodge near. It was described by Edward Hasted in 1798 as a "small mean building, consisting of one aisle and a chancel, with a low pointed wooden current on it".

The church combines with St Leonard's, Badlesmere, forming one parish. Both are open everyday, and frequently used for prayer by walk-ins as well as regulars. Holy Communions are held every first and third Sunday of the month. They combine to hold many occasions each year too, this includes flower festivals, chilli festivals, concerts, lunches, and outdoor activities.

== Demographics ==
=== Population ===
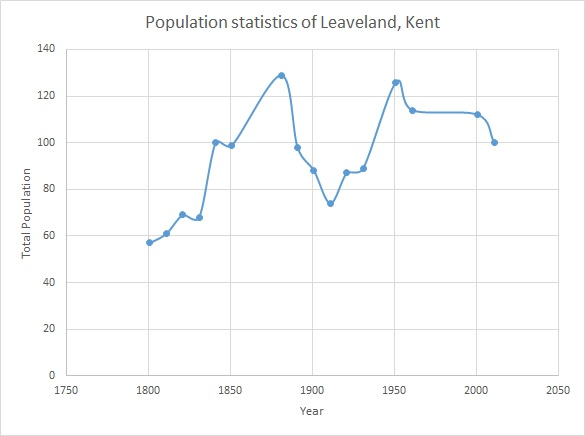
Total Population of Leaveland Civil Parish, Kent as reported by the Census of Population from 1801 to 2011

The population of Leaveland over the last two centuries (1801-2011) has fluctuated. For the first century the population saw a significant increase and then a drastic decrease towards the end. In 1801, the population was 57, and this was the lowest it has ever been. From this date up until 1881 the population more than doubled to 129, the highest the population has ever been. In 1911 it plummeted to 74, but by 1921 it began to increase again and by 1951 reached 126, after this, it has gradually decreased, and by 2011 reached 100. The population now is actually less than it has been in previous decades.

Leaveland has a very small population compared to its surrounding areas. In 2011 Badlesmere had a higher population of 134, and Sheldwich had more than quadruple Leaveland with 491.

According to the 2011 census 11% of the population are aged 0–15, 80% are aged between 16 and 74, and 9% are aged 75+. The average age is 48.3 years old.

=== Ethnicity ===
According to the 2011 census, the only ethnic group in Leaveland is White British. 100 out of 100 people are reported to be White British. In 2001 census there was also 100% White British but with 112 people.

=== Employment ===
Occupational structure of males and females in Leaveland, taken from Census data from 1881

The largest sector in employment in 1881 for males was agriculture with 22. This was the most common, as during this time the majority of men would work as labourers on the rich's land. On the other hand, the largest sector for women was "unknown" with 23. This could be because during this time women may have stayed at home to look after their children. Birth rates would have been very high because contraceptives weren't accessible, this means that families were bigger. This is very different to the 2011 census where employment categories were very different. The most common sectors include Skilled Trade, which includes metal and electrical trades as well as agricultural skills (with 13 people), and Professional Occupations which involve health, science and business (with 10 people). These have all changed because of economic growth and the development of new industries to make a living, not just agriculture.

=== Housing ===
The housing types in Leaveland include Detached, Semi-detached, flats and terraced housing, with the majority being owner occupied. House prices can vary from low to high, but the current (2017) average value is £306,730, and this is a 4.12% increase from the previous year. This is over double of that 20 years ago where the value change was £228,036. Although, this is much lower compared to surrounding villages like Badlesmere where the average house value is £784,596 and Throwley where the average value is £675,161.

=== Education ===
The closest nursery and primary school is Sheldwich, located 1.5 miles away. They are an Ofsted "outstanding" school, with a combined intake of 481 children. Nearest Secondary schools are in Faversham (5mls) or Ashford (8mls).

=== Health ===
The closest hospital is Faversham Cottage hospital, which is 4.5 miles away, this is a rehabilitation focused inpatient hospital, with only 25 beds. For accident and emergency the William Harvey Hospital in Ashford is the closest, at 7.7 miles away.
