= Listed buildings in Folkestone and Hythe district, Kent =

Historic structures in Kent, England

There are about 900 Listed Buildings in the Folkestone and Hythe District, Kent, England, which are buildings of architectural or historic interest.

- Grade I buildings are of exceptional interest.
- Grade II* buildings are particularly important buildings of more than special interest.
- Grade II buildings are of special interest.

The lists follow Historic England’s geographical organisation, with entries grouped by county, local authority, and parish (civil and non-civil). The following lists are arranged by parish.

Parish	Listed buildings list	Grade I	Grade II*	Grade II	Total
Acrise	Listed buildings in Acrise				
Brenzett	Listed buildings in Brenzett				
Brookland	Listed buildings in Brookland, Kent				
Burmarsh	Listed buildings in Burmarsh				
Dymchurch	Listed buildings in Dymchurch				
Elham	Listed buildings in Elham				
Elmsted	Listed buildings in Elmsted				
Folkestone	Listed buildings in Folkestone	1	5	120	126
Hawkinge	Listed buildings in Hawkinge				
Hythe, Kent	Listed buildings in Hythe, Kent	1	3	115	119
Ivychurch	Listed buildings in Ivychurch				
Lydd	Listed buildings in Lydd				
Lyminge	Listed buildings in Lyminge				
Lympne	Listed buildings in Lympne				
Monks Horton	Listed buildings in Monks Horton				
New Romney	Listed buildings in New Romney				
Newchurch	Listed buildings in Newchurch, Kent				
Newington	Listed buildings in Newington, Shepway				
Old Romney	Listed buildings in Old Romney				
Paddlesworth	Listed buildings in Paddlesworth				
Postling	Listed buildings in Postling				
Saltwood	Listed buildings in Saltwood				
Sandgate	Listed buildings in Sandgate, Kent				
Sellindge	Listed buildings in Sellindge				
Snargate	Listed buildings in Snargate				
St Mary in the Marsh	Listed buildings in St. Mary in the Marsh				
Stanford	Listed buildings in Stanford, Kent				
Stelling Minnis	Listed buildings in Stelling Minnis				
Stowting	Listed buildings in Stowting				
Swingfield	Listed buildings in Swingfield				
