= Halfway Houses, Kent =

Village in Kent, England

Coordinates: 51.4209°N 0.7762°E

Halfway Houses
- Location within Kent
- District: Swale
- Shire county: Kent
- Region: South East
- Country: England
- Sovereign state: United Kingdom
- Post town: Sheerness
- Postcode district: ME12
- Police: Kent
- Fire: Kent
- Ambulance: South East Coast
- UK Parliament: Sittingbourne and Sheppey

Halfway Houses is a village on the Isle of Sheppey in the Swale borough of Kent in England. It derives its name from the pub in the village centre, with the same name, which was so named because it is halfway between Minster and Sheerness, before the coastal road was built along the north coast connecting Minster and Sheerness. It is bordered to the west by the town of Queenborough and the village of Minster-on-Sea, and to the east by the town of Minster. It is one mile south of the town of Sheerness. It is in the Queenborough and Halfway ward of Swale Borough Council.

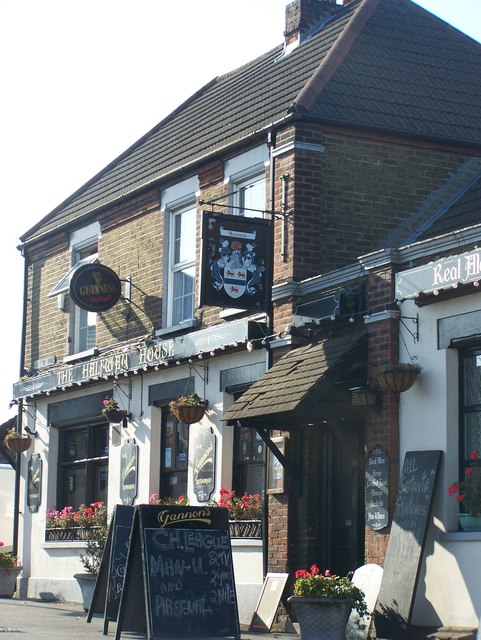
The Halfway House Public House

The German writer Uwe Johnson is buried in the Halfway Houses Cemetery.
