= Hartlip =

Village in Kent, England

Coordinates: 51.3477°N 0.6432°E

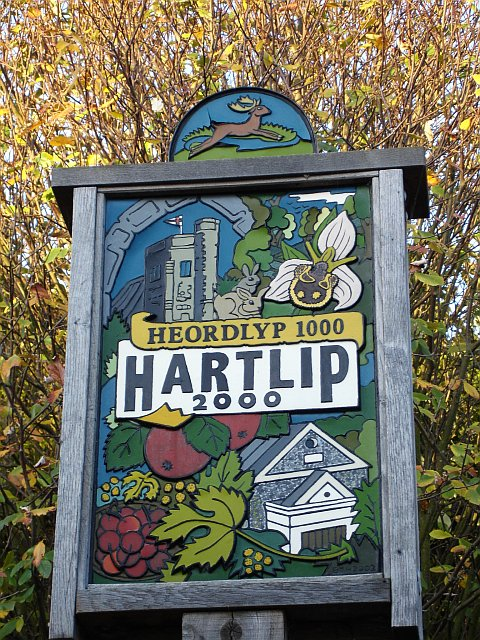
- Hartlip village sign

- Location within Kent
- Population: 769; 746 2011 Census
- OS grid reference: TQ841642
- District: Swale
- Shire county: Kent
- Region: South East
- Country: England
- Sovereign state: United Kingdom
- Post town: Sittingbourne
- Postcode district: ME9
- Police: Kent
- Fire: Kent
- Ambulance: South East Coast
- UK Parliament: Sittingbourne and Sheppey

Hartlip is a village and civil parish in the borough of Swale, Kent, England.

Parish estimated population in 1991 was 680, and in 2011, 746. In 2001 there were 566 registered voters.

The name Hartlip derives from the Old English hliep, which meant a gate or fence. In combination with heorot (hart or stag), the name therefore means a "gate over which harts leap". The first recorded version of the name was Heordlyp in the 11th century.

== Geography ==
Hartlip is between the M2 motorway (Strood to Canterbury) and the A2 main road from London to Canterbury. It is at Hartlip Hill, between Rainham and Newington on Watling Street, the old Roman road. Standing about 160 feet (49 m) above sea level, the parish covers 1,420 acres (570 ha), and is in an agricultural region of fruit farming, hops and grain.

== Landmarks ==
Queendown Warren, a nature reserve in the village, covers almost 200 acres (81 ha) and comprises distinct sections. The original reserve was a rabbit warren in mediaeval times and forms the reserve's core. It has been open downland for many hundreds of years and has an internationally important community of grassland orchids.

The countryside around Hartlip held in the past, three manor houses: Yaugher, Hartlip, and Grayney. From these manors remain two manor houses. Yaugher had the manor house Queendown Warren. This was built in 1560 using oak bought from Henry VIII. In 1841 the owner chose to move the house to a new site. The local wagoner and his men took down the house and moved it a few miles to its present location on Queendown Warren alongside the nature reserve.

Hartlip Place, a Grade II listed country house, was built in c1812 for William Bland, replacing a former house built for the Osborne family, who had held the manor since the 1400s.

There are the remains of an extensive Roman villa discovered in Danes Field.

Hartlip parish church, named St. Michael and All Angels, is built of flint and has a peal of 6 bells. The oldest bell, number 5, was cast by Robert Burford between 1392 and circa 1418. The church registers go back to 1538. The village also has a Cardiphonia United Methodist church, built in 1821.

Hartlip Endowed Church of England Primary School is one of the oldest establishments for primary education in North East Kent. It was endowed in 1678 by Mary Gibbon and rebuilt in 1855. It is next to the parish church, with an adjoining gateway.

The only public house is the Rose and Crown. It is at the lower end of Hollow Lane, in Grainey Field. Whose name is reputed to come from a secret tunnel leading to it from the church.
