= Lower Halstow =

Village in Kent, England

Coordinates: 51.3738°N 0.669°E

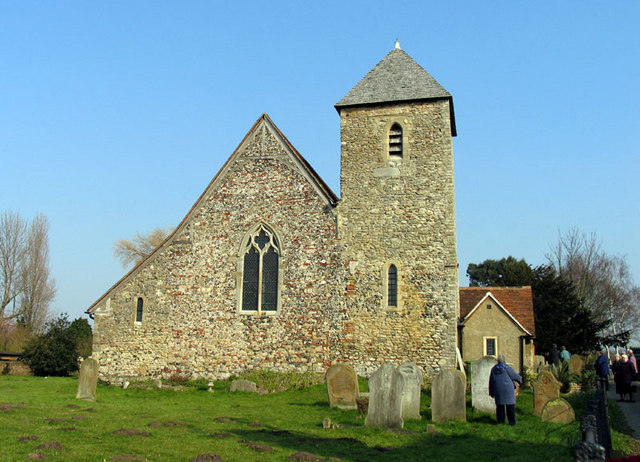
- Parish church of St Margaret of Antioch

- Location within Kent
- Population: 1,180 (2011 Census)
- District: Swale
- Shire county: Kent
- Region: South East
- Country: England
- Sovereign state: United Kingdom
- Post town: Sittingbourne
- Postcode district: ME9
- Dialling code: 01795
- Police: Kent
- Fire: Kent
- Ambulance: South East Coast
- UK Parliament: Sittingbourne and Sheppey

Lower Halstow is a village and civil parish in the Swale district of Kent, England. The village is northwest of Sittingbourne on the banks of the Medway Estuary. It lies north of Newington on the A2 Roman road.

The 2011 census recorded the parish's population as 1,180.

The village has a long history, with evidence of constant occupation since the Iron Age. Being so close to the water, Lower Halstow has (until recently) been a village that has made its living from the water. Whether it be ancient pottery making, ancient fishing, barge building, or in the 19th- and 20th-century brick-making (Eastwoods Brickworks), the water has been the lifeblood of the village.

According to Edward Hasted in 1798, two large hospital ships, commonly called lazarettos, (which were the surviving hulks of 44-gun ships) were moored in Halstow Creek. The lazarettos monitored ships coming to England which were forced to stay in the creek under quarantine, to protect the country from infectious diseases.

In 1563 Queen Elizabeth ordered a survey, and Halstow Key (a wharf on the creek), was made up of 24 people in houses and 14 living on boats. There were two hamlets, one beside the wharf and the other around Halstow Green on Lower Street. The rest of the northern lands were salt marsh. Lands heading southwards (measuring 1200 acres) were heavy clay. All the lands were under the control of the manor of Milton Regis.

The creek and some of the village is featured in the 2017 film Wonder Woman. The village has an active cricket club.

== Etymology ==
The name of the village has developed gradually over the years: Holy Place (Halig stow) Pronounced "ail-stoo", with a long "oo" as in "through" c. 1100; Halgastaw, 1160; Halgastow, 1199; Halegestowe, 1226; Halgesto, 1576; Halstowe, 1610; Halstoe, c. 1790; Halstow, 1810 – Lower Halstow.

== Parish church ==
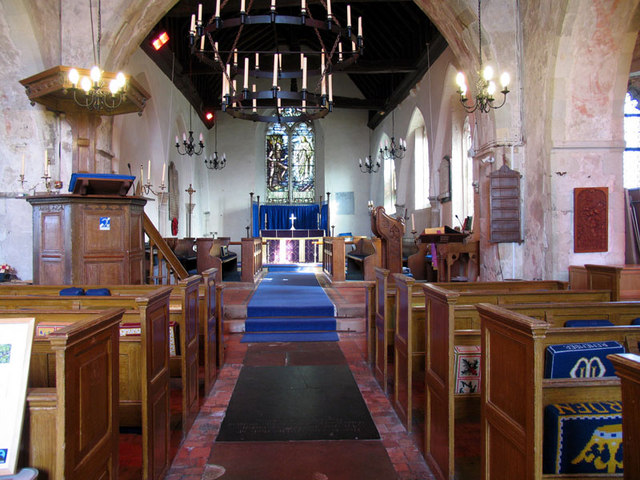
Inside the nave of St Margaret's, looking east to the chancel

On a bank of the Medway Estuary is the Church of England parish church of St Margaret of Antioch. It is an 8th-century Saxon church to which were added north and south aisles in the 12th century and a west tower in the 13th century. The masonry includes re-used Roman tiles. The font is Norman and was made around AD 1190. Unusually it is made of lead. In the nave and aisles are remnants of 14th-century wall paintings. For a time in the 12th century its parish priest was John de London who was a nephew to St Thomas Becket.

The ecclesiastical parish is in the deanery of Sittingbourne, which is part of the Diocese of Canterbury. The building is Grade I listed.

== Other buildings ==
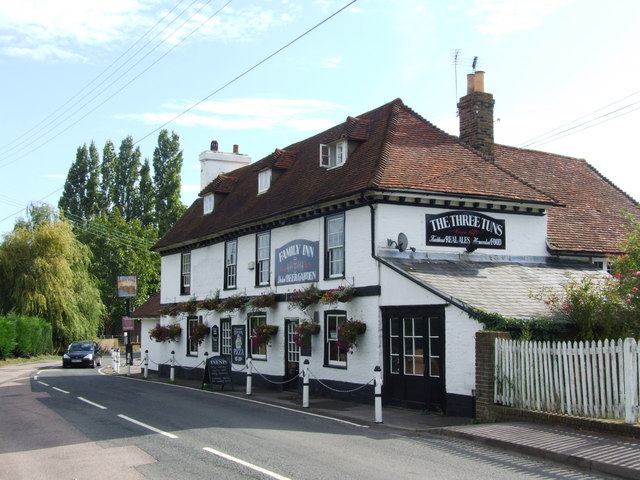
The Three Tuns Inn on Lower Street

The village has an 18th-century pub, the Three Tuns, which is a Grade II listed building.

Green Farm House is 17th- and 18th-century and is also Grade II listed.

== See also ==
- High Halstow on the Hoo Peninsula
