= Borough of Swale =

- Non-metropolitan district and borough
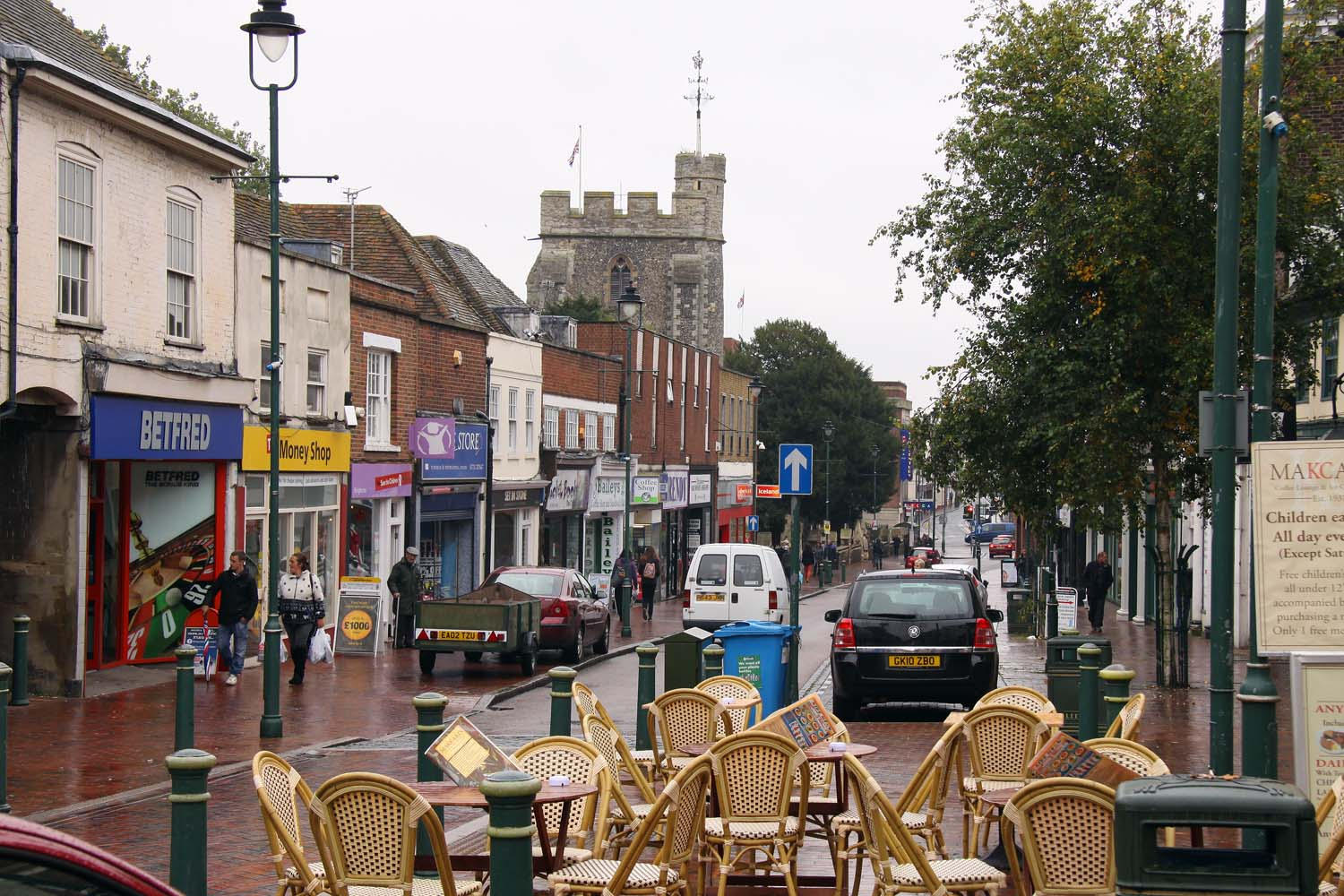
- Sittingbourne town centre

- Swale shown within Kent
- Coordinates: 51°20′24.73″N 0°43′51.32″E
- Sovereign state: United Kingdom
- Constituent country: England
- Region: South East England
- Non-metropolitan county: Kent
- Status: Non-metropolitan district
- Admin HQ: Sittingbourne
- Incorporated: 1 April 1974

Government
  - Type: Non-metropolitan district council
  - Body: Swale Borough Council
  - MPs: Helen Whately (C); Kevin McKenna (L)

Area
  - Total: 144.2 sq mi (373.4 km^{2})
  - Rank: 93rd (of 296)

Population (2025)
  - Total: 160,671
  - Rank: 137th (of 296)
  - Density: 1,114/sq mi (430.3/km^{2})

Ethnicity (2021)
  - Ethnic groups: List: 93.8% White; 2.3% Black; 1.8% Mixed; 1.5% Asian; 0.5% other

Religion (2021)
  - Religion: List: 47.2% Christianity; 45.3% no religion; 5.1% not stated; 1% Islam; 0.4% other; 0.4% Hinduism; 0.3% Buddhism; 0.1% Sikhism; 0.1% Judaism
- Time zone: UTC0 (GMT)
  - Summer (DST): UTC+1 (BST)
- ONS code: 29UM (ONS); E07000113 (GSS)
- OS grid reference: TQ9018863720

Swale is a local government district with borough status in Kent, England. The council is based in Sittingbourne, the borough's largest town. The borough also contains the towns of Faversham, Queenborough and Sheerness, along with numerous villages and surrounding rural areas. It includes the Isle of Sheppey and is named after The Swale, the narrow channel which separates Sheppey from the mainland part of the borough. Some southern parts of the borough lie within the Kent Downs, a designated Area of Outstanding Natural Beauty.

The borough borders the Medway unitary authority area to the west, the Borough of Maidstone to the south-west, the Borough of Ashford to the south-east, and the City of Canterbury to the east. Under proposed reorganisation in April 2028 the borough will be abolished and will join with Ashford Borough Council and Folkestone and Hythe District Council to form a new Mid Kent Unitary Authority. Elections to form a new shadow authority will be held in April 2027.

== History ==
The district was created on 1 April 1974 under the Local Government Act 1972 covering the area of four former districts, which were all abolished at the same time:

- Faversham Municipal borough
- Queenborough-in-Sheppey Municipal Borough (which covered the whole Isle of Sheppey)
- Sittingbourne and Milton Urban District
- Swale Rural District

The new district was named Swale, after the waterway which divides the mainland part of the district from the Isle of Sheppey. The district was awarded borough status on 20 January 1978, allowing the chair of the council to take the title of mayor.

Under current local government reorganisation plans, all district councils in Kent, as well as the county council, will be abolished in 2028, with the borough becoming part of a new Mid Kent unitary authority.

== Governance ==
Swale Borough Council

Type
- Type: Non-metropolitan district

History
- Founded: 1 April 1974

Leadership
- Mayor: Derek Carnell, Swale Independents since 13 May 2026
- Leader: Tim Gibson, Labour since 17 May 2023
- Chief Executive: Larissa Reed since January 2021

Structure
- Seats: 47 councillors
- Political groups: Administration (15) Labour (15) Other parties (32) Conservative (10) Swale Independents (8) Liberal Democrats (5) Reform UK (4) Green (2) Restore Britain (1) Independent (2)
- Length of term: 4 years

Elections
- Voting system: First-past-the-post
- Last election: 4 May 2023

Motto
- Known By Their Fruits

Meeting place
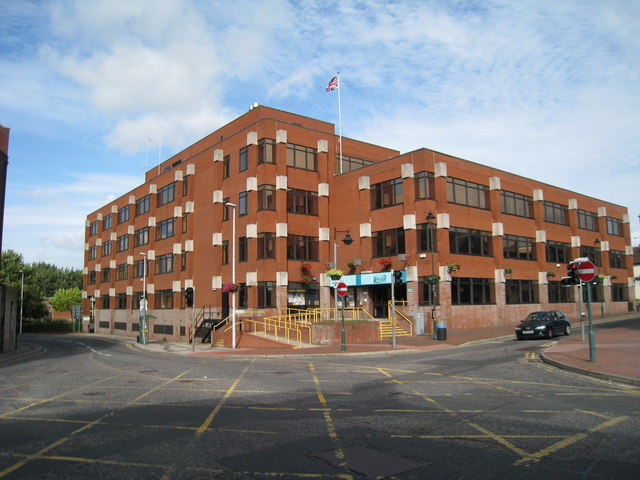
- Swale House, East Street, Sittingbourne, ME10 3HT

Website
- www.swale.gov.uk

Swale Borough Council provides district-level services. County-level services are provided by Kent County Council. Most of the borough is also covered by civil parishes, which form a third tier of local government.

=== Political control ===
The council has been under no overall control since 2019. Following the 2023 election a coalition of Labour, local party the Swale Independents, the Greens and an independent councillor formed the council's administration. The coalition separated in December 2024, since when the council has been led by a minority Labour administration.

The first election to the council was held in 1973, initially operating as a shadow authority alongside the outgoing authorities before coming into its powers on 1 April 1974. Political control of the council since 1974 has been as follows:

Party in control	Years
No overall control	1974–1976
Conservative	1976–1986
No overall control	1986–2002
Conservative	2002–2019
No overall control	2019–present

=== Leadership ===
The role of Mayor of Swale is largely ceremonial. Political leadership is instead provided by the leader of the council. The leaders since 2002 have been:

Councillor	Party	From	To
Andrew Bowles	Conservative	2002	May 2019
Roger Truelove	Labour	22 May 2019	27 Apr 2022
Mike Baldock	Swale Independents	27 Apr 2022	May 2023
Tim Gibson	Labour	17 May 2023	

=== Composition ===
Following the 2023 election, and subsequent by-elections and changes of allegiance up to March 2026, the composition of the council was:

Party	Councillors
Labour	15
Conservative	10
Swale Independents	8
Liberal Democrats	5
Reform	4
Green	2
Independent	2
Restore	1
Total	47

=== Elections ===
Since the last boundary changes in 2015 the council has comprised 47 councillors representing 24 wards, with each ward electing one, two or three councillors. Elections are held every four years.

=== Premises ===
The council is based at Swale House on East Street in Sittingbourne.

== Economy ==
Swale is a mainly rural borough, containing a high proportion of the UK's apple, pear, cherry and plum orchards (the North Kent Fruit Belt), as well as many of its remaining hop gardens. Faversham has the Shepherd Neame brewery. Founded in 1698 it is claimed to be oldest brewery in the UK.

Sheerness is a busy port and previously produced steel. Sittingbourne has a variety of smaller industrial sites.

== Transport ==
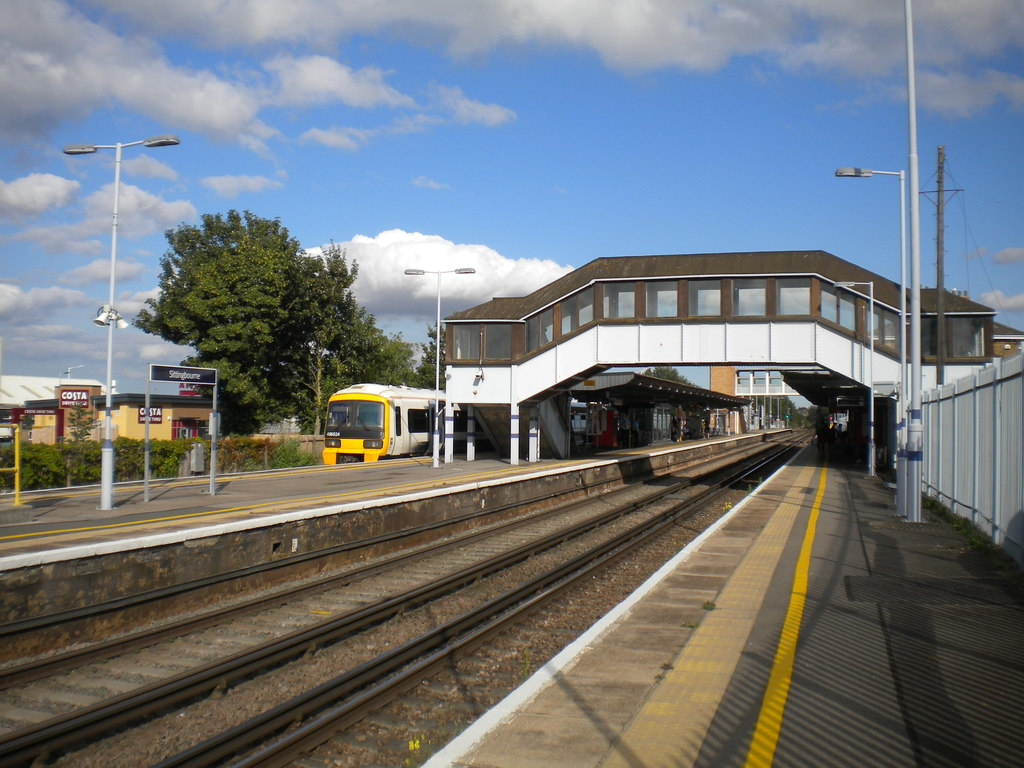
Sittingbourne railway station

The Roman Watling Street passed through the area, as witness the straightness of the A2 main road, now by-passed by the M2 motorway.

There are two railway lines in Swale: the Chatham Main Line and the Sheerness line, which meet at Sittingbourne.

Two adjoining bridges across The Swale link the Isle of Sheppey to the mainland: Kingsferry Bridge and the Sheppey Crossing.

In 2022, the council implemented a low-emission car club in the town of Faversham, in partnership with car sharing company Hiyacar. After a successful first year, the council expanded the Swale Car Club offering to the town of Sittingbourne.

== Media ==
In terms of television, Swale is mainly served by BBC South East and ITV Meridian (East) broadcasting from the Bluebell Hill transmitter. However some parts of Faversham and surrounding villages take their signals from the Dover transmitter.

Local radio stations are:

- BBC Radio Kent on 96.7 FM
- Heart South on 103.1 FM
- SFM Radio (for Sittingbourne) on 106.9 FM
- BRFM 95.6 FM on 95.6 FM and Sheppey FM 92.2 on 92.2 FM (for the Isle of Sheppey)

Local newspapers are Sittingbourne News Extra, yourswale, and Sheerness Times Guardian that serves the Isle of Sheppey.

== Parishes ==
Most of the borough is covered by civil parishes. The parish councils for Faversham, Queenborough and Sheerness take the style "town council". The former Sittingbourne and Milton Urban District is an unparished area, as is the Halfway Houses area on Sheppey, being the only part of the pre-1974 borough of Queenborough-in-Sheppey not to have been subsequently added to a parish.

- Bapchild
- Bobbing
- Borden
- Boughton-under-Blean
- Bredgar
- Doddington
- Dunkirk
- Eastchurch
- Eastling
- Faversham (town)
- Graveney with Goodnestone
- Hartlip
- Hernhill
- Iwade
- Leysdown
- Lower Halstow
- Luddenham
- Lynsted with Kingsdown
- Milstead
- Minster-on-Sea
- Newington
- Newnham
- Norton, Buckland and Stone
- Oare
- Ospringe
- Queenborough (town)
- Rodmersham
- Selling
- Sheerness (town)
- Sheldwich, Badlesmere and Leaveland
- Stalisfield
- Teynham
- Throwley
- Tonge
- Tunstall
- Upchurch
- Warden

== Mayors ==
For the council's first four years it had a chairman rather than a mayor. The chairmen were:

- 1974-75: R. D. Sharrock
- 1975-76: K. H. Burbidge
- 1976-78: R. W. Barnicott

From the grant of borough status in January 1978 onwards the chairman of the council has taken the title of mayor. The mayors have been:

- 1978–78: R. W. Barnicott
- 1978–80: J. M. Elliott
- 1980–81: A. M. North
- 1981–82: T. T. Holden
- 1982–83: L. A. Nash
- 1983–84: H. T. Curling
- 1984–85: William Boggia
- 1985–86: Richard Moreton
- 1986–87: Kenneth Ingleton
- 1987–88: Peter Morgan
- 1988–89: L. T. Vaughan
- 1989–91: Jean Newman
- 1991–92: Keith Evans
- 1992–93: Brian Groves
- 1993–94: Brian Austen
- 1994–95: L. T. Vaughan
- 1995–96: Don Jordan
- 1996–97: Ernest Madgwick
- 1997–98: David Sargent
- 1998–99: Gerry Lewin
- 1999–00: Ann McLean
- 2000–01: Peter Salmon
- 2001–02: Brenda Simpson
- 2002–03: Brenda Hammond
- 2003–04: Mick Constable
- 2004–05: Colin Prescott
- 2005–06: Bryan Mulhern
- 2006–08: John Morris
- 2008–09: Alan Willicombe
- 2009–10: Adrian Crowther
- 2010–11: Steve Worrall
- 2011–12: Ben Stokes
- 2012–13: Pat Sandle
- 2013–14: Sue Gent
- 2014–15: George Bobbin
- 2015–16: Anita Walker
- 2016–17: Lesley Ingham
- 2017–18: Colin Prescott
- 2018–19: Samuel Koffie-Williams
- 2019–20: Kenneth Ingleton
- 2020–22: Paul Stephen
- 2022–23: Simon Clark
- 2023–24: Sarah Stephen
- 2024–25: Ben Martin

== Honorary Freemen of the Borough ==
- 1978: D. Allen
- 1982: D. M. Elvy
- 1986: Bob Geldof
- 2004: Gerald David Thomsett
- 2004: Peter James Salmon
- 2018: Stephen Mark Brown
- 2021: Peter Morgan
- 2021: Robin Castle
