= National Cycle Route 174 =

Cycle route in the United Kingdom

The National Cycle Route 174 is part of the National Cycle Network in the United Kingdom. Part of it is known as The Sheerness Way.

When the route was first planned on Sheppey, passenger ferry services was still running to Vlissingen in the Netherlands. The ferry was popular with cyclists and the expectation was that large numbers of European visitors would start their cycling journey at Sheerness. As a section of the National Cycle Route 1 runs from Sittingbourne to Rainham, and a link route also ran north (from Kemsley) up to the village of Iwade and on to Minster and Sheerness on the Isle of Sheppey. The ferry stopped running in 1994. But the council and Sustrans still carried on with the new cycle route.

Construction on the circular route (the Sheppey Way) was started in July 2010 and planning permission was granted in October 2010. It was funded by Kent County Council and Sustrans. It was funded by Kent County Council and Sustrans. The route was then launched in June 2011 as a 5.6 mile, 9 km flat route around Sheerness, which has been designed especially for family usage. 13% of the route is on-road and 87% is off-road.

The route also links to a second route on the island leading to Leysdown-on-Sea, 'the Isle of Harty Trail'.

== Route of Sheerness Way ==
Starts from Barton's Point Coastal Park, on Marine Parade then heads west along the Queenborough Lines (former 19th century Naval Fortification) towards the western end of Sheerness and then it heads up via various housing suburb roads (which includes a toucan crossing, before following the Fleet (river) towards Blue Town via Festival Field. Then it heads along the railway towards Sheerness-on-Sea railway station and then up to the beachfront (passing the large Tesco Superstore). Then the route follows the sea wall promenade east, back to Barton's Point.
