= Barton's Point Coastal Park =

Park in Kent, England

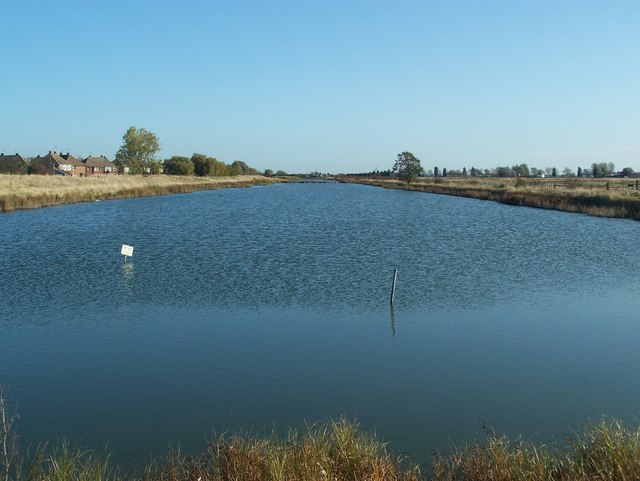
- Barton's point Canal (between Barton's Point and Queenborough)
- Interactive map of Barton's Point Coastal Park
- Coordinates: 51°26′16″N 0°47′06″E
- Area: 40 acres (160,000 m^{2})
- Created: 1971
- Operator: Kent County Council,
- Open: All Year, 7 days a week, dawn until dusk

Barton's Point Coastal Park shown within Kent (grid reference TQ936746)

Barton's Point Coastal Park is on the Isle of Sheppey, in Kent, England. It lies between Minster and Sheerness. Within the park is a former military ditch/canal from Marine Parade (beside the coast) heading south-westerly towards West Minster (a suburb of Sheerness).

== History ==
After the Dutch Navy, attacked the blockhouse, built to protect Sheerness Royal Navy dockyard from attack in the Raid on the Medway. In 1667, a plan was drawn up to defend the landward side of the dockyard. A flooded ditch between two demi-bastions (a half-bastion, which has one face and one flank). They were then named 'Queenborough' and 'Minster'. They were started in 1667 and completed in 1685. In 1782, the ditch was further extended, now heading from the Medway (on the west) to the Thames (on the east).

After the Royal Commission on the Defence of the United Kingdom in 1860, which decided that the Dockyard needed more defensive works on its landward side. Due to economic pressures the simplest means was to build an earthwork defensive line across the Sheerness peninsula, 1 km south-east of the earlier bastion-trace defences of the Sheerness Lines. These were called the 'Queenborough lines'.

Lands were then acquired under Defence Act, 1860.

The lines were completed in 1868, they are 3.5 km long. The rampart (defensive wall) is constructed of earth and shingle and measures between 15.5 m to 17m wide and between 1.9m and 2.5m high. A bridge lead over the lines from Halfway into Sheerness and the dockyard.

Between 1889 - 1891, Barton's Point Battery was built, to defend the mouth of the River Medway from attack. Initially, plans were drawn up that forts were to be built either end of the canal. But only the Barton's Point battery was ever built. Then in 1895, four cannons were installed. 2 x 9.2inch breech loaders and 2 x 6inch breech loaders.

In 1899, a rifle range was created in front of the canal.

In 1905, 2 hotchkiss machine guns were installed on vavasseur mountings. By 1914, the battery was unused and partially demolished. In 1926, all the guns were removed and the battery became a training base instead.

Along the canal, four air raid shelters were built during World War II. These are currently sealed.

In June 2012, the Queenborough Lines became a listed ancient monument. No.1404499. Later the battery site was used as a holiday camp. The Queenborough Lines now known locally as 'Canal Bank'.

== Coastal Park ==
The park is used for various outdoor leisure activities, including cycling, water sports and walking (with walking trails along the canal).

The lake is available for fishing, sailing, radio sailing, windsurfing, kayaking and canoeing, and fishing permits can be purchased from The Boat House Café.

In 2013, dead fish were found on the bank of the lake. The Environment Agency investigated, but no harmful effects of the water could be found, and the fish deaths were blamed on seasonal effects.

The Sheerness Way cycling route runs through the park and along Queenborough Lines towards Sheerness.

The Park is also home to the 'Sheppey Model Engineering Society' which offers miniature steam train rides on a Model 0-4-0T Steam Locomotive No.93 'Janine' (based on a Hudswell Clarke Steam locomotive). Within the park is a field for flying model aeroplanes, used by the 'Bartons Point Model Flying Club'.

The lake is one of the leading venues for Radio Sailing, radio controlled model sailing racing. Several National Championships have been held on the lake, as well as regular open meetings, and meeting which form part of national travellers series of races. These events are hosted and run by the East Kent Radio Sailing Club.

In 1954, Sheppey Sea Cadet Unit No 301 moved to the park, they were part of the Navy League Sea Cadet Corps since 29 June 1942.

In 2011, a large children’s Adventure Play Area was opened. It was designed by children from The Isle of Sheppey Academy and built with funding (£87,000) from the Big Lottery.

In May, a funfair was in the park, in June, the Harmony Folk Festival took place. Then in July, Minster Rotary Club managed the Island raft race.
