= Crundells Wharf =

Coordinates: 51°25.072′N 0°44.372′E

Crundells Wharf was a general purpose wharf once used by sailing barges bringing cargoes of timber and building materials to Queenborough near Sheerness on the Isle of Sheppey, Kent, England. Situated across the waters of the West Swale and to the north are Chetney Marshes. Here is Deadman's Island, where Napoleonic prisoners who died on the prison hulks were buried, along with those who died on vessels quarantined on the nearby River Medway.
