= Sheerness =

Town in Kent, England

Coordinates: 51.441°N 0.760°E

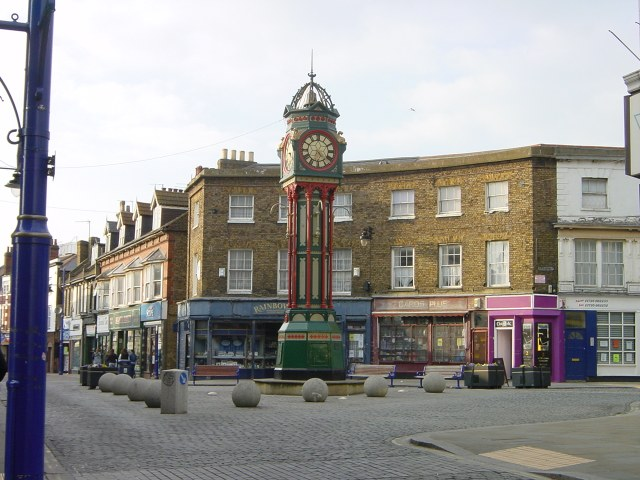
- Sheerness clock tower

- Location within Kent
- Population: 13,249 (2021 census)
- OS grid reference: TQ919749
  - London: 37 miles (60 km) W
- District: Swale
- Shire county: Kent
- Region: South East
- Country: England
- Sovereign state: United Kingdom
- Post town: SHEERNESS
- Postcode district: ME12
- Dialling code: 01795
- Police: Kent
- Fire: Kent
- Ambulance: South East Coast
- UK Parliament: Sittingbourne and Sheppey

Sheerness (/ʃɪərˈnɛs/) is a port town and civil parish beside the mouth of the River Medway on the north-west corner of the Isle of Sheppey in north Kent, England. With a population of 13,249, it is the second largest town on the island after the nearby town of Minster which has a population of 16,738.

Sheerness began as a fort built in the 16th century to protect the River Medway from naval invasion. In 1665 plans were first laid by the Navy Board for Sheerness Dockyard, a facility where warships might be provisioned and repaired. The site was favoured by Samuel Pepys, then Clerk of the Acts of the navy, for shipbuilding over Chatham inland. After the raid on the Medway in 1667, the older fortification was strengthened; in 1669 a Royal Navy dockyard was established in the town, where warships were stocked and repaired until its closure in 1960.

Beginning with the construction of a pier and a promenade in the 19th century, Sheerness acquired the added attractions of a seaside resort. Industry retains its important place in the town and the Port of Sheerness is one of the United Kingdom's leading car and fresh produce importers. The town is the site of one of the UK's first co-operative societies and also of the world's first multi-storey buildings with a rigid metal frame.

== History ==
The first structure in what is now Sheerness was a fort built by order of Henry VIII to prevent enemy ships from entering the River Medway and attacking the naval dockyard at Chatham. In 1666 work began to replace it with a stronger fort. However, before its completion, this second fort was destroyed in 1667 by the Dutch Naval Fleet in their capture of the town, as part of what would be known as the raid on the Medway.

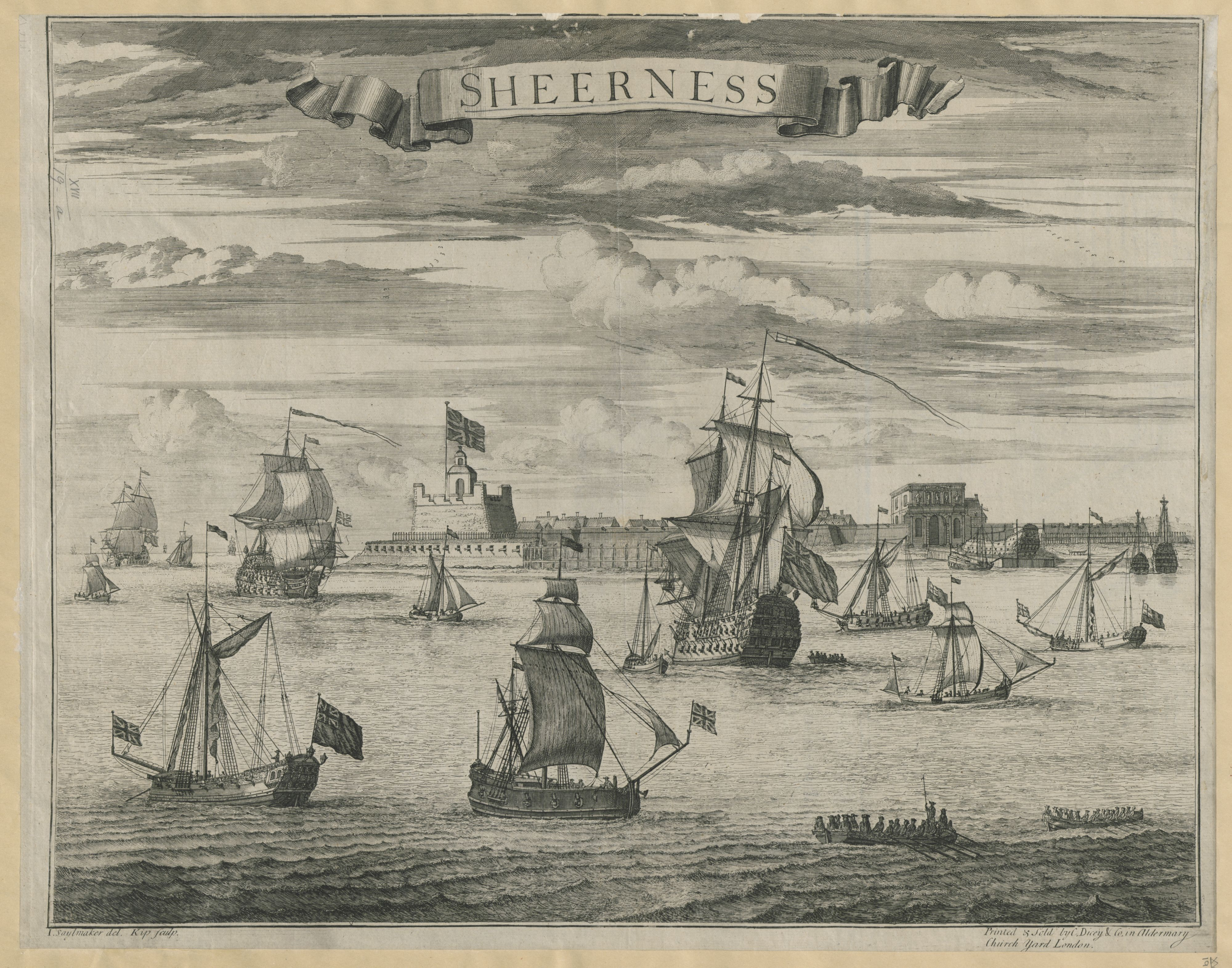
View of Sheerness in the early 1700s; in the background is the fort with its prominent tower and gatehouse, in front of which is the dockyard.

The Secretary to the Admiralty, Samuel Pepys, subsequently ordered the construction of Sheerness Dockyard as an extension to that at Chatham. There was no established settlement in the vicinity of Sheerness, so most of the workers were initially housed in hulks. By 1738, dockyard construction workers had built the first houses in Sheerness, using materials they were allowed to take from the yard. The grey-blue naval paint they used on the exteriors led to their homes becoming known as the Blue Houses. This was eventually corrupted to Blue Town (which is now the name of the north-west area of Sheerness lying just beyond the current dockyard perimeter). The modern town of Sheerness has its origins in Mile Town, which was established later in the 18th century at a mile's distance from the dockyard (Blue Town having by then filled the space available).

In 1797, discontented sailors in the Royal Navy mutinied just off the coast of Sheerness.

By 1801 the population of the Minster-in-Sheppey parish, which included both Sheerness and the neighbouring town of Minster, reached 5,561. In 1816, one of the UK's first co-operative societies was started in Sheerness, chiefly to serve the dockyard workers and their families. The Sheerness Economical Society began as a co-operative bakery but expanded to produce and sell a range of goods. By the middle of the 20th century, the society had spread across the Isle of Sheppey and had been renamed the Sheerness and District Cooperative Society.

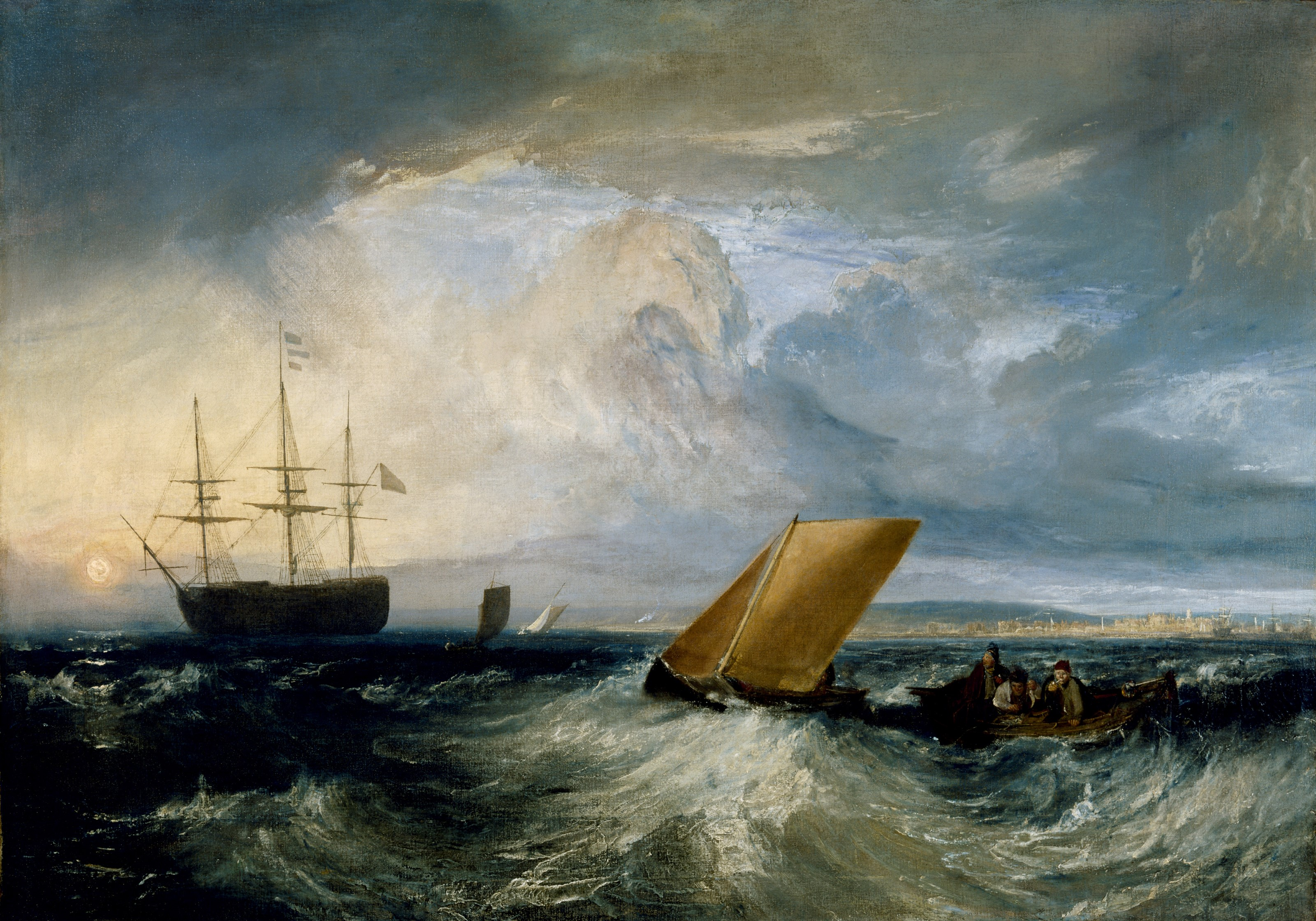
Sheerness as Seen from the Nore by J.M.W. Turner, 1808

In the early 1820s a fire destroyed the old Blue Houses. New houses and a major redevelopment of the dockyard followed. A high brick wall and a moat were constructed around the yard to serve as a defence measure and remained in place until the end of the 19th century. As the settlement expanded eastwards, away from the dockyard and the Blue Houses, the wider area became known as Sheerness, taking its new name from the brightness or clearness of the water at the mouth of the River Medway. The rebuilt Dockyard contained many groundbreaking new buildings and structures; for example, completed in 1860 and still standing today, the Sheerness Boat Store was the world's first multi-storey building with a rigid metal frame.

In 1904 the RN established a torpedo school in Sheerness, with HMS Actaeon used as training hulk. The school closed in 1922.

From the completion of the dockyard until 1960 Sheerness was one of the bases of the Nore Command of the Royal Navy, which was responsible for protecting British waters in the North Sea. The command was named after the Nore sandbank in the Thames Estuary, about 3 miles (5 km) east of Sheerness.

In 1863, mains water was installed in the town, and the Isle of Sheppey's first railway station opened at the dockyard. Towards the end of the 19th century, Sheerness achieved official town status and formed its own civil parish, separate from Minster-in-Sheppey. The 1901 Census recorded the Sheerness parish as having 18,179 residents and 2,999 houses.

The town's low rainfall and ample sunshine made it popular as a seaside resort, with tourists arriving by steamboat and train. The Sheppey Light Railway opened in 1901, connecting the new Sheerness East station with the rest of the island. However, by 1950, lack of demand led to the railway's closure. The Sheerness and District Tramways, which opened in 1903, only lasted until 1917.

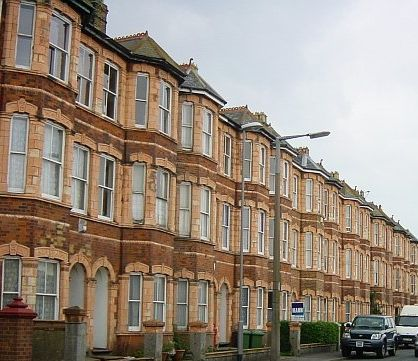
Terraced houses near the seafront

In 1944 the United States cargo ship SS Richard Montgomery ran aground and sank 1 mile (1.6 km) off the coast of Sheerness, with large quantities of explosives on board. Due to the inherent danger and projected expense, the ship and its cargo have never been salvaged; if the wreck were to explode, it would be one of the largest non-nuclear explosions of all time. A 2004 report published in New Scientist warned that an explosion could occur if sea water penetrated the bombs.

During the Second World War the Shoeburyness Boom, which ran across the Thames Estuary to protect shipping from submarine attack, ran from Sheerness to Shoeburyness in Essex. A similar structure was built along the same alignment in the early 1950s to protect against Soviet submarines. The Sheerness end of the boom was demolished in the 1960s. Sheerness was severely affected by the devastating North Sea flood of 1953, which completely flooded the Royal Naval dockyard and the town center.

In March 1960 the Royal Navy ceased operating the Sheerness dockyard and the Medway Port Authority took over the site for commercial use. The dockyard closure led to thousands of job losses, and most of the nearby houses and shops in the Bluetown area were eventually abandoned and demolished. By the 1961 census, the population of Sheerness had fallen to 13,691. The dockyard closure also led to the decline of the Sheerness and District Cooperative Society, as many of its members were dockyard workers. At the time, the society was the island's main retailer, but it has since been reduced to a few shops and been merged with a larger society.

The German writer Uwe Johnson lived in Sheerness for the last decade of his life, from 1974 to 1984, having left East Germany. A monograph by Patrick Wright, The Sea View Has Me Again, was published by Repeater Books in 2020.

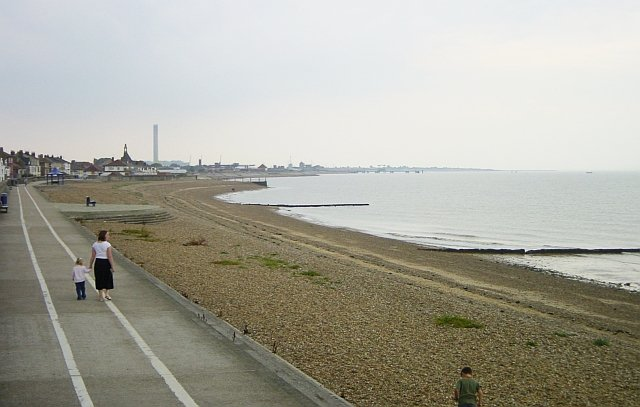
Sheerness beach with the chimney of the Grain Power Station in the distance (since demolished in 2016).

In 2003, the Beachfields Park project was organised to publicise Beachfields' heritage and to preserve it for future generations. Students of Cheyne Middle School and Minster College, with assistance from local organisations, researched the funfair, bandstands, Prisoner of the War hut, boating lake and bowling green. As part of the project, students wrote a book, Tales of Beachfields Park, which won the Historical Association Young Historian Primary School Award for Local History.

As of 2007, Bluetown is an industrial area, and Sheerness has become the largest port in the UK for motor imports. Prior to the closure of the Dockyard, twenty-five of its historic buildings were listed in recognition of their "architectural distinction and value"; regardless of this, the majority were subsequently demolished (including Admiralty House and the quadrangular Great Store) and others were left to decay. In the early 21st century a concerted effort was made to save the remaining buildings and several have been restored to residential use. In July 2013 Swale Borough Council announced that a deal had been reached to secure restoration of Rennie and Taylor's Royal Dockyard Church (which had been gutted by a fire in 2001), with a view to new uses such as displaying the above-mentioned model of the Dockyard.

== Mills ==
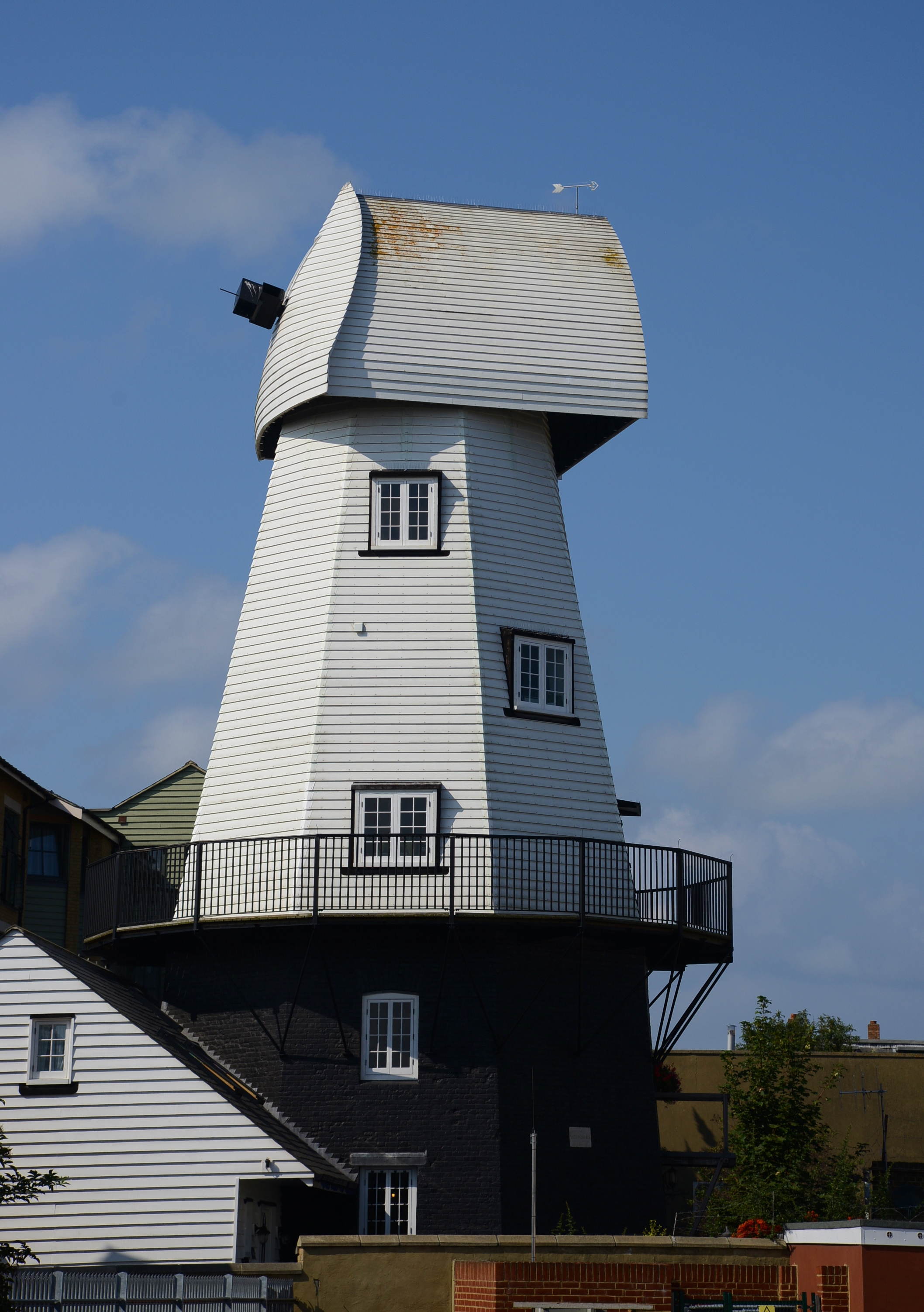
Great Mill

Sheerness has had four windmills. They were the Little Mill, a smock mill that was standing before 1813 and burnt down on 7 February 1862; The Hundred Acre Mill, a small tower mill which was last worked in 1872 and demolished in 1878 leaving a base which remains today; The Great Mill, a smock mill, the building of which was started in 1813 and completed in 1816, which was demolished in 1924 leaving the base, upon which a replica mill body was built to serve as flats.

On 23 January 2008 a fire started in the mill tower. The fire was declared not to have been a case of arson; Little is known of the fourth windmill, said to have been a vertical axle windmill designed by Stephen Hooper.

== Governance ==
Sheerness is in the parliamentary constituency of Sittingbourne and Sheppey. Since the constituency's creation in 1997 until 2010 the Member of Parliament was Derek Wyatt of the Labour Party. At the 2010 general election, Gordon Henderson of the Conservative Party won the seat. Before 1997, Sheppey and Sittingbourne were part of the constituency of Faversham. Sheerness is in the local government district of Swale. The town is covered by the local government wards of Sheerness, which has three of the forty-seven seats on the Swale Borough Council. At the 2015 local elections, two of those seats were held by the Labour Party and one by UKIP.

Swale Borough Council is responsible for running local services, such as recreation, refuse collection and council housing; Kent County Council is responsible for education, social services and trading standards. Both councils are involved in town planning and road maintenance. From 1894 to 1968, Sheerness formed its own local government district, Sheerness Urban District, and lay within the administrative county of Kent. Over much of the past century, the Labour Party has received the most support in Sheerness, mainly due to the town's industrial nature. As early as 1919, the town had four Labour councillors; Faversham elected its first only in 1948.

== Geography ==
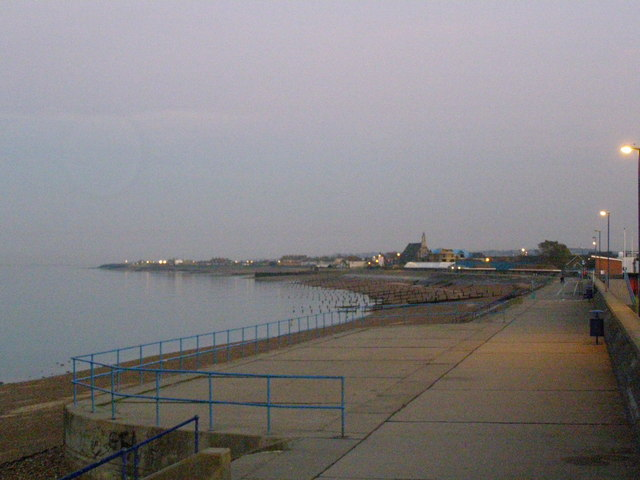
Sheerness beach

Sheerness is in the north-west corner of the Isle of Sheppey in North Kent. To the north, sandy beaches run along the coast of the Thames Estuary. To the west, the outlet of the River Medway flows into the Estuary. An area of wetlands known as The Lappel lies between the river and the south-western part of town. Marshland lies to the south and the east. The main rock type of the Isle of Sheppey is London Clay, which covers most of North Kent. Along with most of the Kent coast, the uninhabited coastal areas of the island have been designated Sites of Special Scientific Interest, due to their wildlife and geological features.

The nearest towns to Sheerness are Minster, 1 mile (1.6 kilometres) to the east, and Queenborough, two miles (3.2 km) to the south. The villages of Minster-on-Sea and Halfway Houses are 1 mile (1.6 km) to the south-east, and the village of Grain is 2 mi (3 km) to the west, across the River Medway.

The main commercial and leisure areas of the town dominate the north coast, where there is easy access to the pleasure beach. The industrial areas are in the west, beside the wetlands and the River Medway. The Bluetown industrial area and the Port of Sheerness are in the north-western part of the town. The residential districts of Mile Town and Marine Town are in the central and the eastern areas respectively.

The mean annual temperature in Sheerness is 10 °C (50 °F). The average annual maximum temperature is 14 °C (57 °F), and the average annual minimum temperature is 6 °C (43 °F). The warmest time of the year is July and August, when maximum temperatures average 21 °C (70 °F). The coolest time of the year is January and February, when minimum temperatures average 2 °C (36 °F).

The average annual rainfall in Sheerness is 28 inches (711 mm). The average annual duration of sunshine is 1,700 hours; the months May to August have the most hours of sunshine. On average, there are fewer than six days of lying snow per year, and 16 days with thunder per year.

== Demography ==
Sheerness compared
	Sheerness	Swale	England
Total population	11,654	122,801	49,138,831
Foreign born	3.1%	3.6%	9.2%
White	98%	98%	91%
Asian	1.1%	0.7%	4.6%
Black	0.2%	0.3%	2.3%
Christian	72%	76%	72%
Muslim	0.6%	0.4%	3.1%
No religion	19%	15%	15%
Over 65 years old	13%	16%	16%
Source: 2001 UK census

At the 2001 UK census, Sheerness had a population of 11,654. The Office for National Statistics estimated the population in mid-2005 to be 11,000, a decrease of 5.6% since the 2001 census.

The population density at the 2001 census was 9.8 persons per acre (24.2 persons per hectare) and for every 100 females, there were 96.4 males. Residents of Sheerness had an average age of 34.7 years, younger than the 38.2 Swale average. Of all residents, 51% were single (never married) and 24% married; in Swale, 42% were single and 35% were married. Of the 4,870 households, 34% were one-person households, 15% were married couples with dependent children, and 11% were lone parents with dependent children. Of those aged 16–74 in Sheerness, 44% had no academic qualifications, higher than the 34% in all of Swale.

According to the 2001 data, Sheerness has a low proportion of foreign-born residents compared to the rest of England, at 3%. Ninety-eight per cent of residents were recorded as white; the largest minority group was recorded as Asian, at 1.1% of the population. The 2000s saw a rise in the foreign-born population, with the town now having a significant eastern European population. Data from the 2011 census is not yet available to give specific numbers.

== Economy ==
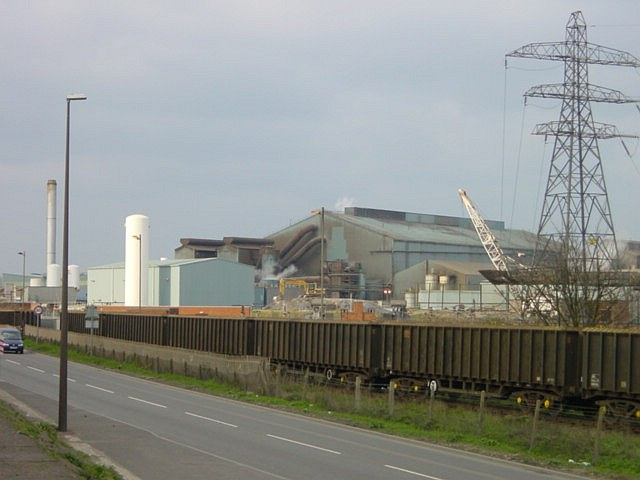
Sheerness steel mill

The Port of Sheerness is a significant feature of the Isle of Sheppey's economy. Covering more than 1.5 million square metres, it is one of the largest foreign car importers in the UK, and it handles thousands of tonnes of fruits and meat products from all over the world. Inexpensive land and good infrastructure, including a rail network that branches off the main passenger line, have attracted industries to the port area, including producers of pharmaceuticals, steel, sausages and garden gnomes.

The major employers are HBC Engineering Solutions, Sheerness Steel, Regis Furniture and The Bond Group - although HBC has closed and the Steel plant is currently closed but is currently being changed and upgraded ready for reopening. The steel mill was established in 1972, designed to recycle scrap steel into rods and coils. It survived a number of closure threats and changes of ownership; from 2003 it was operated by Thamesteel. Thamesteel went into administration in January 2012, with the loss of 350 jobs. Six months later, the plant was bought back by the former owners Al-Tuwairqi Group. As of October 2014 there were plans to reopen the plant as a rolling mill. PeelPort now own the site and are preparing it for reopening as a steel mill. The port has a seafarers' centre, which was refurbished in May 2015, and is operated by Apostleship of the Sea, a seafarers' charity.

The seafront is popular with tourists, and in 2007 Sheerness' recently refurbished town centre had more than 200 shops.

At the 2001 UK census, 35.8% of residents aged 16–74 were employed full-time, 11.6% part-time, 5.8% self-employed and 6.2% unemployed, while 1.5% were students with jobs, 3.4% students without jobs, 11.9% retired, 10.6% looking after home or family, 8.5% permanently sick or disabled and 4.8% economically inactive for other reasons. The unemployment rate of 6.2% was high compared to the national rate of 3.4% and was the highest rate throughout the Swale district. Five per cent of Sheerness residents aged 16–74 had a higher education qualification compared to 20% nationally.

Employment by industry was 22% manufacturing; 18% retail; 10% construction; 10% transport and communications; 9% real estate; 8% health and social work; 6% public administration; 5% education; 5% hotels and restaurants; 1% finance; 1% agriculture; 1% energy and water supply; and 4% other community, social or personal services. Compared to national figures, Sheerness had a relatively high percentage of workers in manufacturing, transport and communications, and a relatively low percentage in agriculture, hotels, restaurants, education, health, social work and finance.

At the 2001 UK census, 4,292 of the town's residents were employed and there were 5,532 jobs within the town. According to Office for National Statistics estimates, the average gross weekly income of households in Sheerness from April 2001 to March 2002 was £385 (£20,075 per year).

== Culture ==
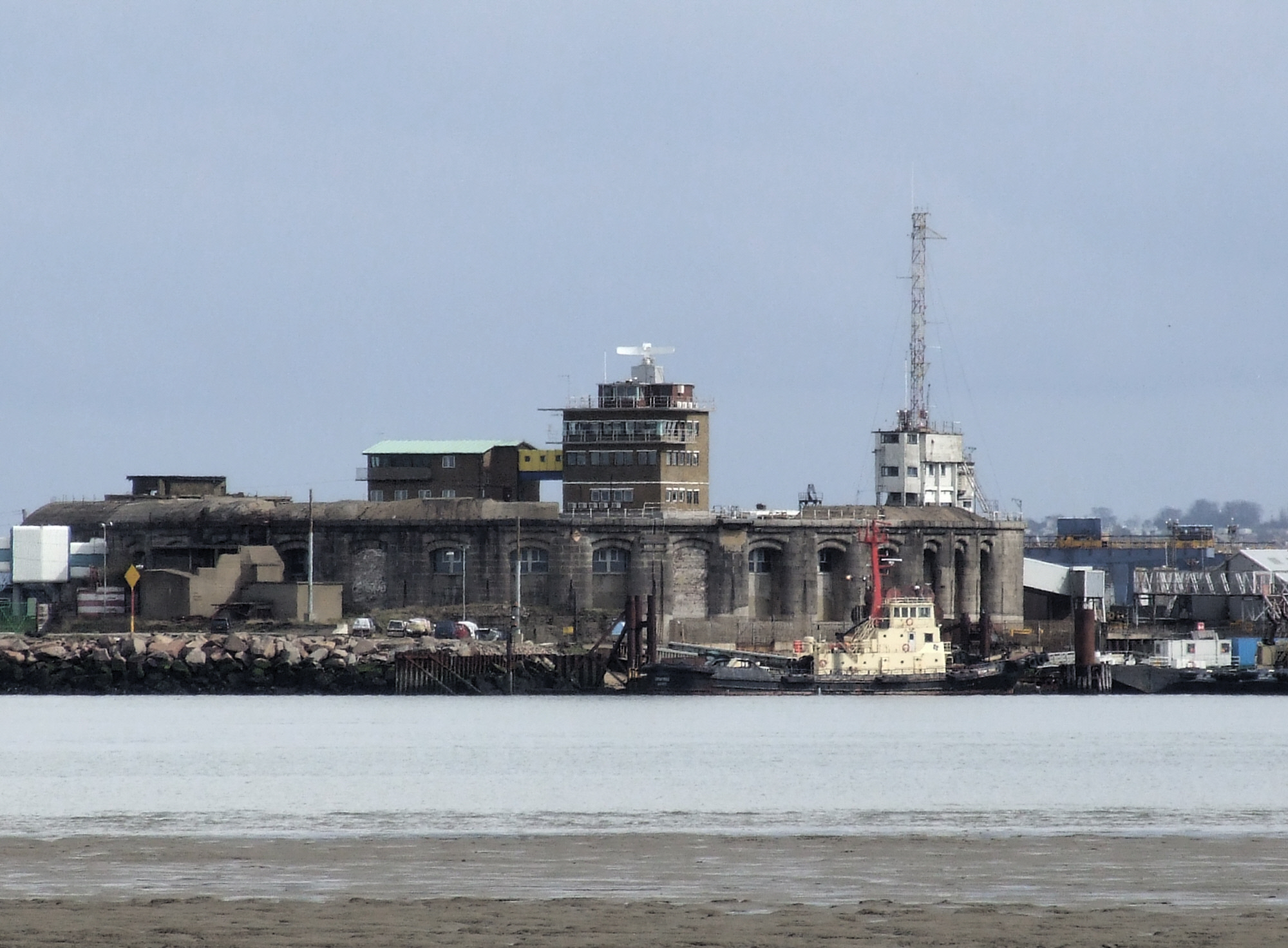
Garrison Point Fort seen from the Isle of Grain

Sheerness's sand and shingle beach was awarded a European Blue Flag for cleanliness and safety. Flower gardens decorate the seafront, and a sea wall forms a promenade along the coast. The Sheppey Leisure Complex located near the beach contains a swimming pool and badminton, squash and tennis courts. Other sports clubs include Sheerness Town Bowls Club, Sheerness East Cricket Club, the Isle of Sheppey Sailing Club, Beachfields Skatepark, Sheerness East Table Tennis Club, Catamaran Yacht Club, and Sheerness Swimming Club and Lifeguard Corps. Sheerness Golf Club was founded in 1906, and has an 18-hole course just to the south-east of town.

The main football club on the island is Sheppey United. The club was formed in 1890 and has played in the Southern League, Kent League, Aetolian League, Greater London League, Metropolitan London League, Kent County League and the Southern Counties East Football League. Since 2022/23 the club has played in the Isthmian League having secured promotion in the 2021/22 season. Sports can be played for free at the town's recreation grounds at Beachfields Park, Festival Playing Field, and Seager Road Sports Ground.

The annual arts and heritage Sheerness Promenade Festival opened in September 2011 with appearances by Michael Palin and Dan Cruickshank. It takes place in late July at the Sheppey Little Theatre, the Heritage Centre in Blue Town and various other venues in Sheerness.

Sheerness has a library and clubs for photography, music, singing, dancing and writing. The youth club in Meyrick Road, in East Sheerness has been operational for over 50 years and has played a vital role in the development of many young people.

Sheerness's town centre is home to the largest freestanding cast-iron clock tower in Kent. It is 36 feet (11 m) tall and was built in 1902 at a cost of around £360 to commemorate the coronation of King Edward VII. In 2002, the clock tower was restored to celebrate the Silver and Golden Jubilees of Queen Elizabeth II.

== Media ==
The Sheerness Times Guardian is now the only newspaper serving the town and island at large, owned by the KM Group. The Sheppey Gazette closed in 2011 after around 100 years of publication. It was owned by Northcliffe Media.

Local news and television programmes are provided by BBC South East and ITV Meridian. Television signals are received from the Bluebell Hill TV transmitter.

Local radio stations are BBC Radio Kent on 96.7 FM, Heart South on 102.8 FM, Gold on 603 AM, and its own community radio station, BRFM 95.6 FM, which can also be heard online at www.brfm.net and broadcasts 24 hours a day, seven days a week from Minster-on-Sea. In October 2011 BRFM was granted a five-year extension to its broadcast licence by regulator Ofcom. The station is run by 20 volunteers and plays a wide range of music, with news, weather and local events being broadcast around the clock, the station also provides for specialist music during weekday evenings.

Sheerness and the Isle of Sheppey is also served by former online, and now FM, radio station, Sheppey FM, which broadcasts on 92.2FM from Sheerness across the island. It is a community radio station licensed by Ofcom.

In July 2013 the island received some notoriety for an attack on a tour bus of Jewish boys by local youths who shouted epithets, and threw stones and eggs, telling the boys to "go back to where you came from!"

== Transport ==
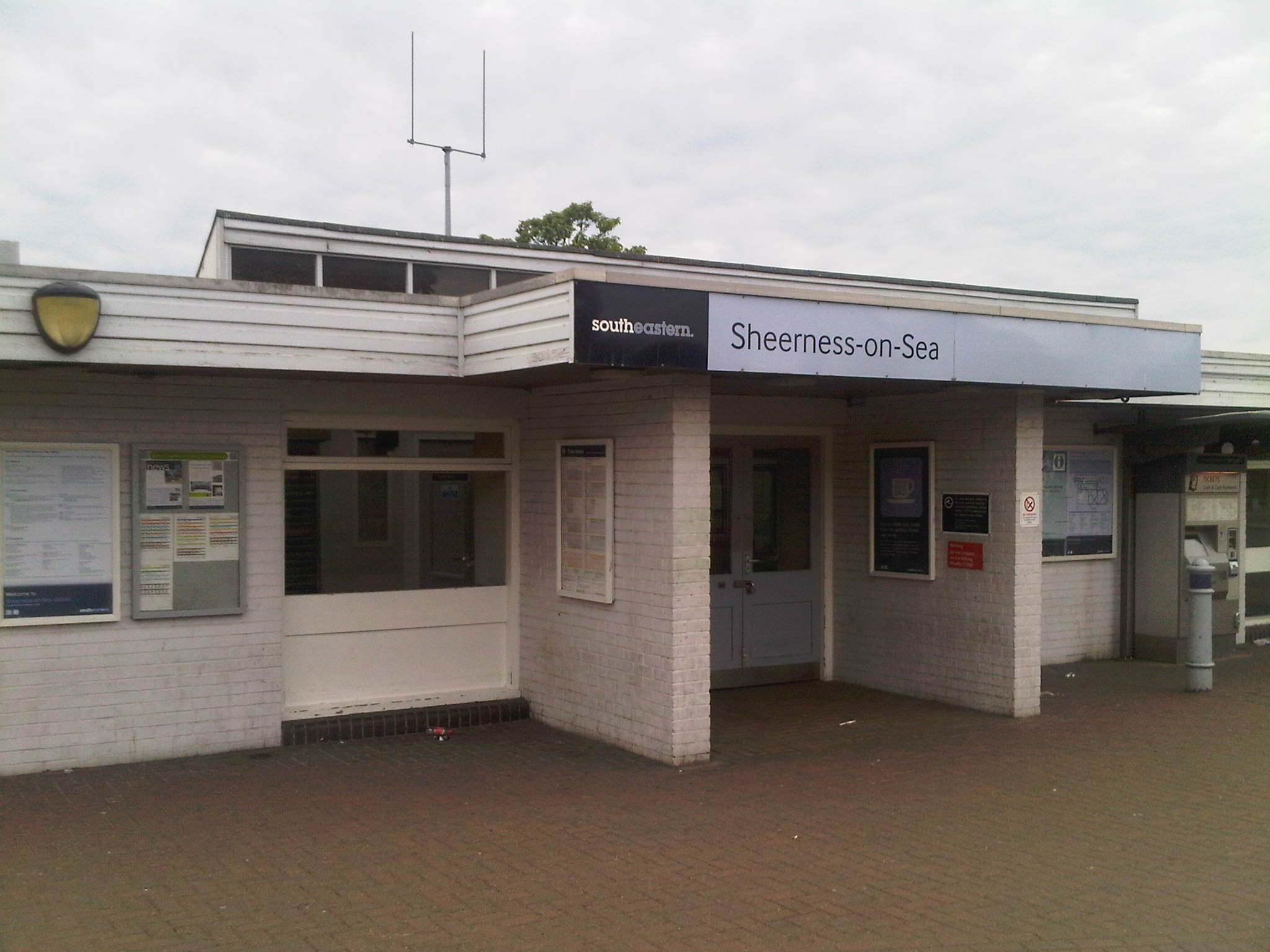
Exterior of Sheerness-on-Sea railway station in 2011

The town is served by Sheerness-on-Sea railway station on the Sheerness Line which connects the town with Sittingbourne, 6 miles (10 km) south on the mainland of Kent. The station is served by an hourly train service to Sittingbourne (increasing to half-hourly at peak times), from where connections can be made to London Victoria, London St Pancras International, Ramsgate and Dover Priory.

Bus Services in Sheerness are operated by Chalkwell Coaches who operate services 334, 360, 361 and 362. These services provide connections to Queenborough, Rushenden, Minster, Eastchurch, Warden, Leysdown-on-Sea, Iwade and Sittingbourne.

No passenger ferry services currently operate from Sheerness, although Olau Line used to run a ferry service to Vlissingen in the Netherlands from 1974 until 1994.

The A249 road terminates at Sheerness, running from Maidstone via Sittingbourne. The road crosses the M2 motorway near Sittingbourne, and the M20 motorway near Maidstone.

== Education ==
Until September 2009, The Isle of Sheppey was the only area in Kent to still have a middle school system. On the island, primary schools taught pupils from ages 4 to 9, middle schools 9–13 and secondary schools 13–18. Minster College in the neighbouring town of Minster was the only secondary school on the island. Sheerness had one middle school, Isle of sheppey Academy, with 800 pupils, although Danley Middle School and St George's Middle School were found in Halfway and Minster, respectively. In 2006, the Cheyne Middle School's Key Stage 2 performance ranked 322nd among Kent's 386 primary and middle schools. The town's primary schools are Richmond First School, Rose Street Primary School, St Edward's Roman Catholic Primary School and West Minster Primary School, all of which cover ages 4–11. Sheppey College, in Sheerness, is a branch of Canterbury College that provides a range of further education courses.

On 1 September 2009, Cheyne Middle school and Minster College merged to become The Isle of Sheppey Academy (now Oasis Academy Isle of Sheppey). Danley Middle school closed and St George's Middle School changed into a primary school with a £3 million fund, and Richmond First School now houses an extra year of students. This change was to bring the island up to date with the rest of the UK with the two-tier system (primary school, and then secondary school). Respectively, The Isle of Sheppey Academy now ranges from students of year 6 to 11, as well as housing the island's sixth form students.

== Notable people ==
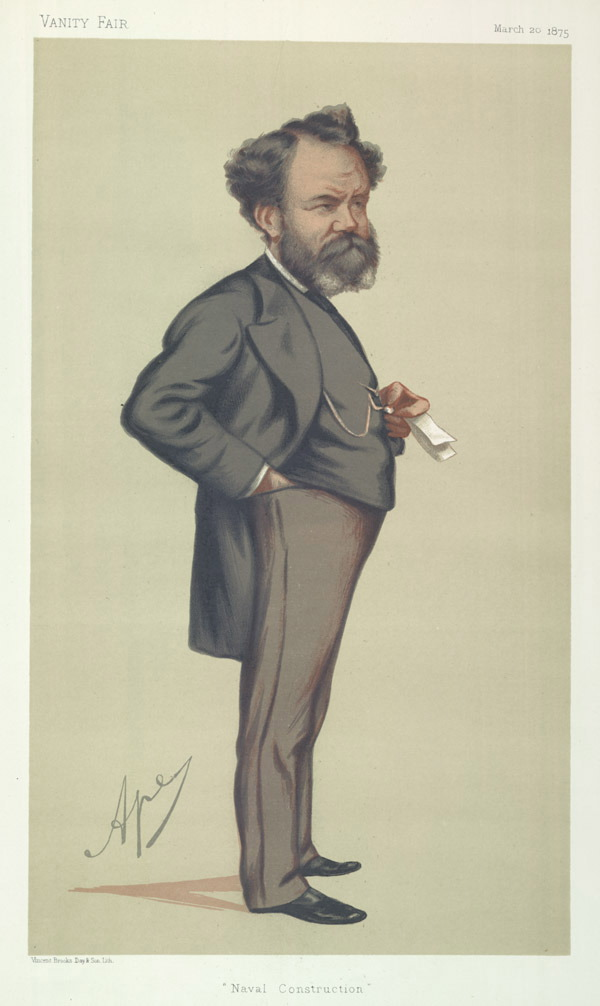
Edward James Reed 1875

- Thomas King (before 1660 – 1725), soldier and MP, lieutenant-governor of Sheerness 1690–1725.
- Thomas Bilbe (1811–1896), shipbuilder and shipowner. He built tea clippers and was involved in the opium trade with China.
- Sir Edward James Reed, KCB, FRS (1830–1906), naval architect, author, politician and railroad magnate, also a Liberal politician in the House of Commons from 1874 to 1906. Reed was born in Sheerness and was a naval apprentice there.
- Charles Hezlet DSO (1891–1965), Irish soldier and amateur golfer. He was runner-up in the 1914 Amateur Championship and was in the British Walker Cup team in 1924, 1926 and 1928.
- James McCudden (1895–1918), First World War flying ace, awarded the Victoria Cross. Lived in Sheerness from 1909 and attended the Sheerness garrison school.
- Sir Stanley Hooker (1907–1984), a mathematician and jet engine engineer, first inventor of the VTOL engine, born in Sheerness.
- William Penney, Baron Penney (1909–1991), mathematician and professor of mathematical physics and leading figure in Britain's nuclear weapons development. Penney was raised in Sheerness and was educated at Sheerness Technical School for Boys from 1924 to 1926.
- Richard Beeching (1913–1985), commonly known simply as Dr Beeching, was a physicist and engineer who for a short but very notable time was chairman of British Railways, severely cutting the British rail network.
- Barbara White, (1923–2013), British actress
- Geoff Beynon (1926–2012), teacher and trade union leader, joint general secretary of the Assistant Masters and Mistresses Association.
- Uwe Johnson (1934–1984) German writer and scholar, lived on Marine Parade.
- Rod Hull (1935–1999), English comedian, appeared with Emu, a mute, highly aggressive arm-length puppet.
- Richard Carpenter (born 1972), footballer with Gillingham F.C. and Brighton & Hove Albion F.C.
- Zack Sabre Jr. (born 1987), professional wrestler under the ring name Zack Sabre Jr.

== See also ==
- Listed buildings in Sheerness
