= Queenborough =

Town in Kent, England

Coordinates: 51.4183°N 0.7450°E

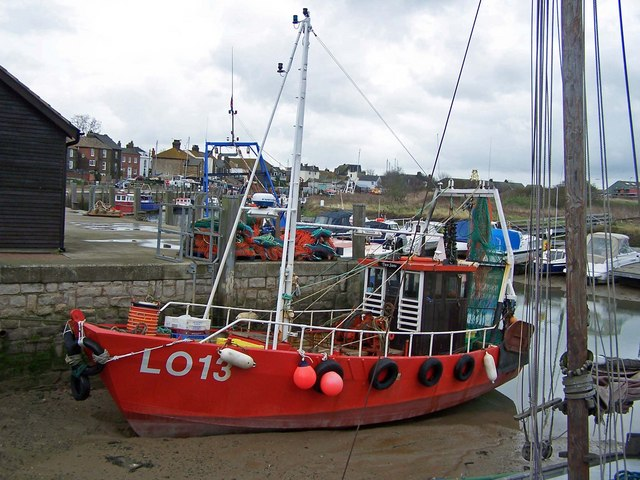
- The Creek

- Location within Kent
- Population: 3,407 (2011 Census)
- OS grid reference: TQ908724
- District: Swale
- Shire county: Kent
- Region: South East
- Country: England
- Sovereign state: United Kingdom
- Post town: QUEENBOROUGH
- Postcode district: ME11
- Dialling code: 01795
- Police: Kent
- Fire: Kent
- Ambulance: South East Coast
- UK Parliament: Sittingbourne and Sheppey

Queenborough is a town on the Isle of Sheppey in the Swale borough of Kent in South East England.

Queenborough is two miles (3 km) south of Sheerness. It grew as a port near the Thames Estuary at the westward entrance to the Swale where it joins the River Medway. It is in the Sittingbourne and Sheppey parliamentary constituency.

Queenborough Harbour offers moorings between the Thames and Medway. It is possible to land at Queenborough on any tide and there are boat builders and chandlers in the marina. Admiral Lord Nelson is reputed to have learned many of his seafaring skills in these waters, and also shared a house near the small harbour with his mistress, Lady Hamilton.

Queenborough today still reflects something of its original 18th-century seafaring history, from which period most of its more prominent buildings survive. The church is the sole surviving feature from the medieval period. The town was first represented by two members of parliament in 1572.

== History ==
=== Saxon ===
In Saxon times, the settlement on the site was known as Cyningburh, "king's borough".

The name Queenborough derives from the Old English cwēnburh and literally means the 'Queen's borough'. The town is named after Queen Philippa, the wife of King Edward III.

=== Medieval and Tudor ===
A fortress, called Sheppey Castle or Queenborough Castle, was built to guard the passage of ships along the Swale upon the command of King Edward III between 1361 and 1377, during the Hundred Years' War with France. It was built on the site of a much earlier, but smaller castle. Its unusual design – round and symmetrical – was described by historians Howard Colvin and R. Allen Brown as "exemplifying the principles of cylindrical and concentric fortification carried to their logical conclusion with perfect symmetry". They also suggest that the design, which bore similarities to Henry VIII's Device Forts of the 16th century, may have been designed to defend against and to make best use of gunpowder artillery. Queenborough was the only true concentric castle built in England. It regained importance in the 16th century under Thomas Cheney, when it is thought to have influenced the construction of nearby Deal Castle and Walmer Castle.

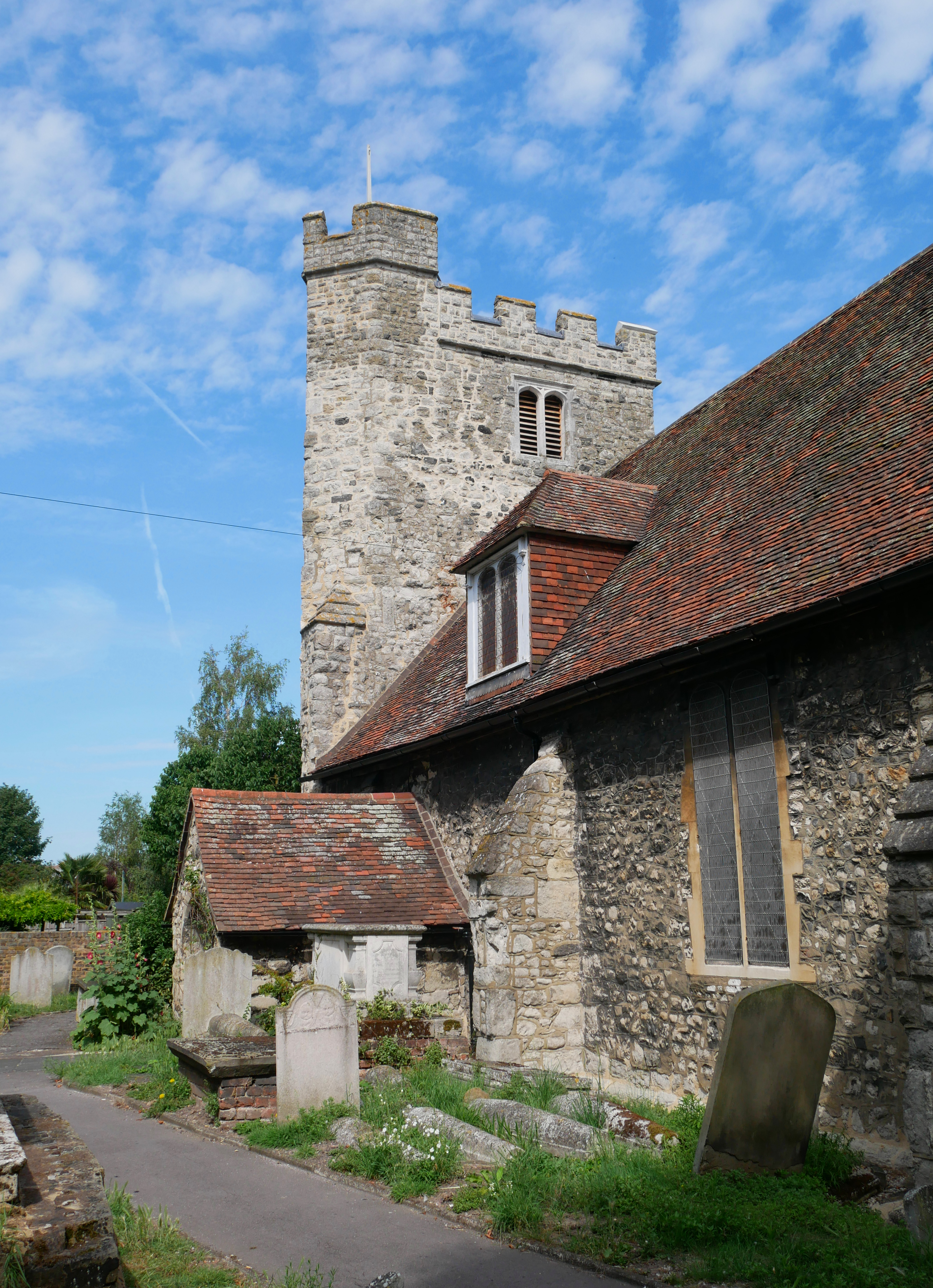
The medieval Holy Trinity Church in Queenborough

In those days north Kent was divided by open waters and marshes stretching inland. The safest navigation to the open sea was then the route from the Thames into the Yantlet Creek (separating the Isle of Grain from the rest of Hoo Peninsula), and thus into the Swale from the Medway estuary, around the leeward side of the Isle of Sheppey into the Wantsum Channel, navigating past the Isle of Thanet to Sandwich and only then into the open waters of the English Channel. It was thus an easily defensible planned-town centre for the wool trade.

King Edward III had the town renamed after his Queen, Philippa of Hainault, and conferred upon it the rights of a free borough, with a governing body of a mayor and two bailiffs. He granted Queenborough a charter in 1366 and two years later bestowed the duties of a royal borough upon it.

During this period, Queenborough, on the Isle of Sheppey, was an important town for the export of wool, a significant crown revenue. In 1368, the Wool Staple was transferred from Canterbury to Queenborough: Sandwich and Queenborough became the two centres in Kent for wool trading.

The castle was excavated in 2005 by Channel 4's archaeology television programme Time Team.

The town was first represented by two members of parliament in 1572, one of its earlier MPs being the explorer Sir Humphrey Gilbert in 1580. Matthias Falconer of Brabant established the first copperas (iron II sulphate) factory in England at Queenborough in 1579.

=== 17th century ===
King Charles I had the town reincorporated under the title of the "mayor, jurats, bailiffs and burgesses of Queenborough", during which time the population was chiefly employed in the local oyster fishery. However the fort having protected the Swale and Medway estuaries for 300 years was never in fact to realise its function as a garrison, and recorded no active military history. After being seized by Parliamentarians in 1650, after the Civil War, and being considered unsuitable for repair, being of "no practical use" it was demolished during the interregnum.

Not long after this, in 1667, the Dutch captured the new Sheerness fort (then under construction) and invaded Queenborough. The occupation lasted only a few days; though the Dutch caused widespread panic, they were unable to maintain their offensive, and withdrew having captured HMS Royal Charles and burnt numerous other ships in the Thames and Medway. Following this raid on the Medway, much-needed attention was given to the improvement of the naval defences of the Medway, which at length helped strengthen the economy of Queenborough and Sheppey. Some 300 years later, in 1967, The Queenborough and Brielle (the Netherlands) twinning project was established.

Work began on overhauling the parish church in 1690.

=== 18th century ===
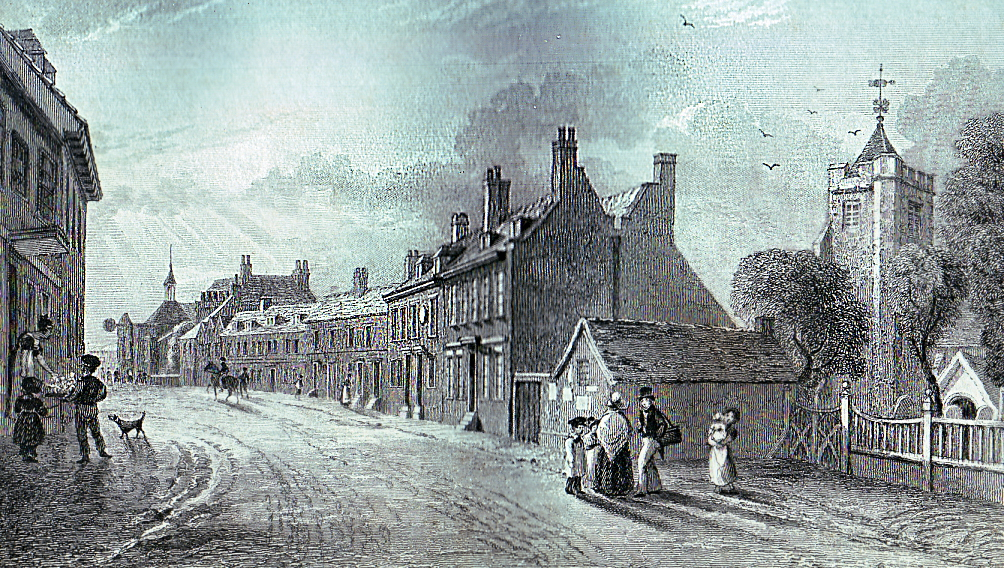
View of Queenborough c. 1830.

The parish church overhaul continued through to 1730, and a number of houses added to the growing town during the 18th century. With the general prosperity of the colonial and mercantile trades of the age, Queenborough thrived. Queenborough Guildhall was completed in 1793.

With the silting up of the Yantlet creek and the Wantsum channel and improved navigation through the Thames estuary to London, Queenborough began to lose its importance, becoming something of a backwater. Daniel Defoe described it as "a miserable and dirty fishing town (with) the chief traders ... alehouse keepers and oyster catchers".

The Royal Navy eventually became less prominent on the River Medway as other dockyards developed and ships grew in size, so that they were largely replaced by prison hulks which would frequently dispose of their dead charges on a salt marsh at the mouth of the Swale, which was subsequently to become known as Dead Man's Island, and can still be found as such, on local maps today. The new fort and harbour developments completed at Sheerness by this time further replaced Queenborough by being better positioned at the mouth of the Medway.

=== 19th century to date ===
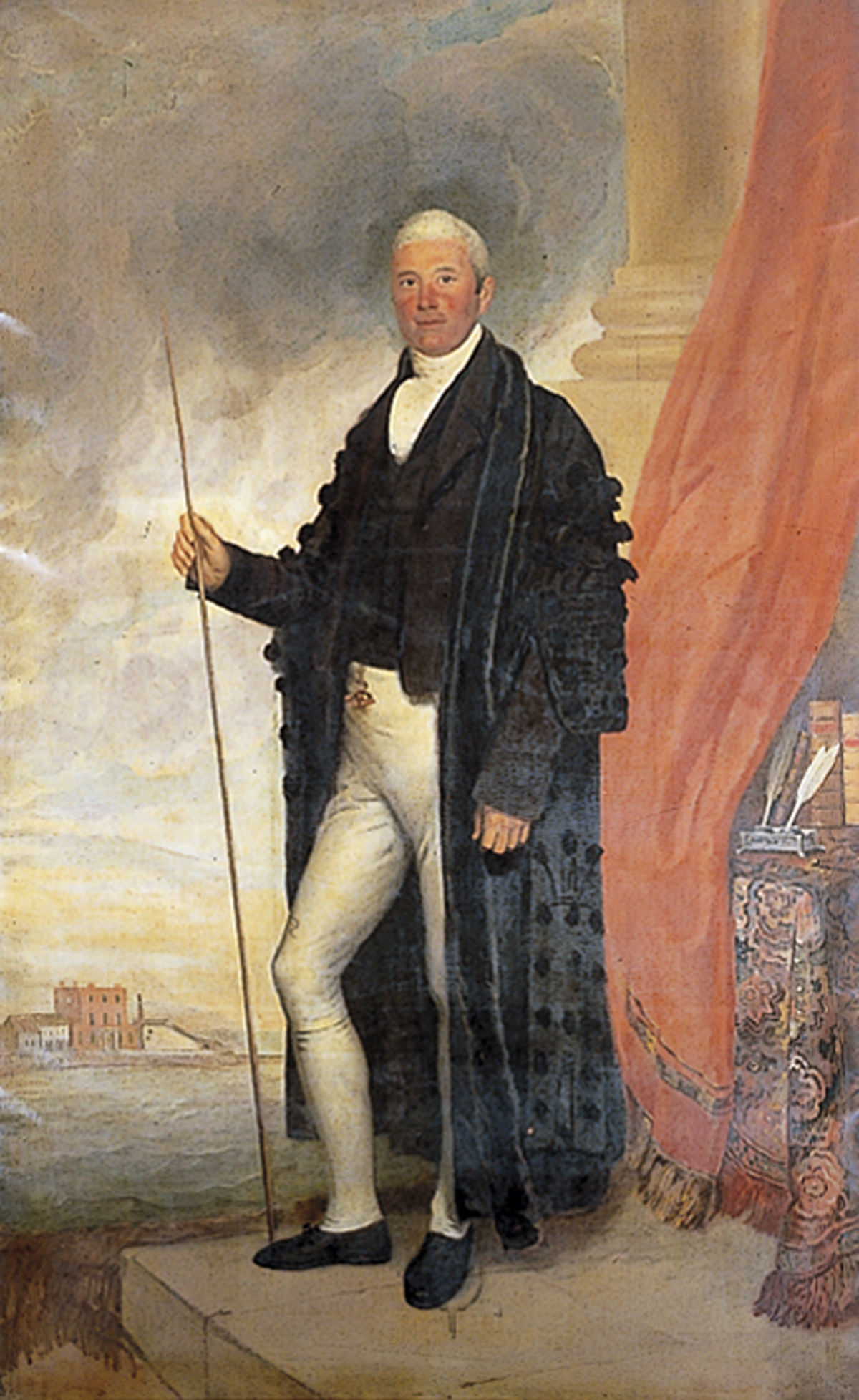
Thomas Young Greet, the Mayor of Queenborough and cause of all the financial problems

Records from between 1815 and 1820 show that the Corporation of Queenborough was in some financial difficulties, owing some £14,500 that it could not hope to pay. It appears that the mayor and other officials had been less than honest in their duties toward the community, with the use of the public money at their disposal. This fraud caused a great financial burden upon the fishers and oyster catchers, who were driven to "unlawful and riotous assembly", in protest against unwarranted charges made upon them in the course of their trade. So serious had this deterioration in conditions become, that by the middle of the 19th century the corporation was bankrupt. A leading figure was Thomas Young Greet, who frequently held the office of mayor, and treasurer, and first came to Queenborough in 1814. He and his friends used their positions to cream off the profits of the fisheries. Parliament was called upon to act, vesting by an act of Parliament much of the town's business in the hands of trustees who were able to refinance the economy by selling land, property and the ancient oyster fishery. The oyster trade having been corrupted by smuggling and the bribery of the island's members of parliament, the town lost its franchise in the Reform Act 1832.

The economy of Queenborough was boosted significantly by the establishment of a branch line from Sittingbourne by the Sittingbourne and Sheerness Railway (later part of the London, Chatham & Dover Railway), which operated in conjunction with a mail and passenger service by steamer to Vlissingen in the Netherlands. The Swale was bridged when the railway was built in 1860.

From the town's depression in the 1850s there began a process of recovery. New industries came to Queenborough including a glass works and a company engaged in coal washing. Besides these many other small industries developed, including potteries, the Sheppy Fertilizer company (which used the old spelling of Sheppey) and the glue works. The Portland cement works opened in 1890, and there is still a considerable trade in timber.

A borough charter granted in 1885 gave some renewed impetus to the struggling borough council, but it was not until 1937 that the Charity Commissioners were at last able to appoint a borough council, but the town and its fisheries never fully recovered. The present trustees are Swale Borough Council, which incorporated the old borough council in the local government reorganisation of 1974. Queenborough now has a town council, which includes a mayor.

Unsightly modern sea wall defences have hindered the character of the beaches but were deemed necessary; a large yachting harbour exists, where the pirate radio ship Radio Caroline (in the river Medway 2003–04) anchored for a while. Tourism is today a major feature of the island, with Queenborough enjoying some of the fruits of local investment.

== Government ==
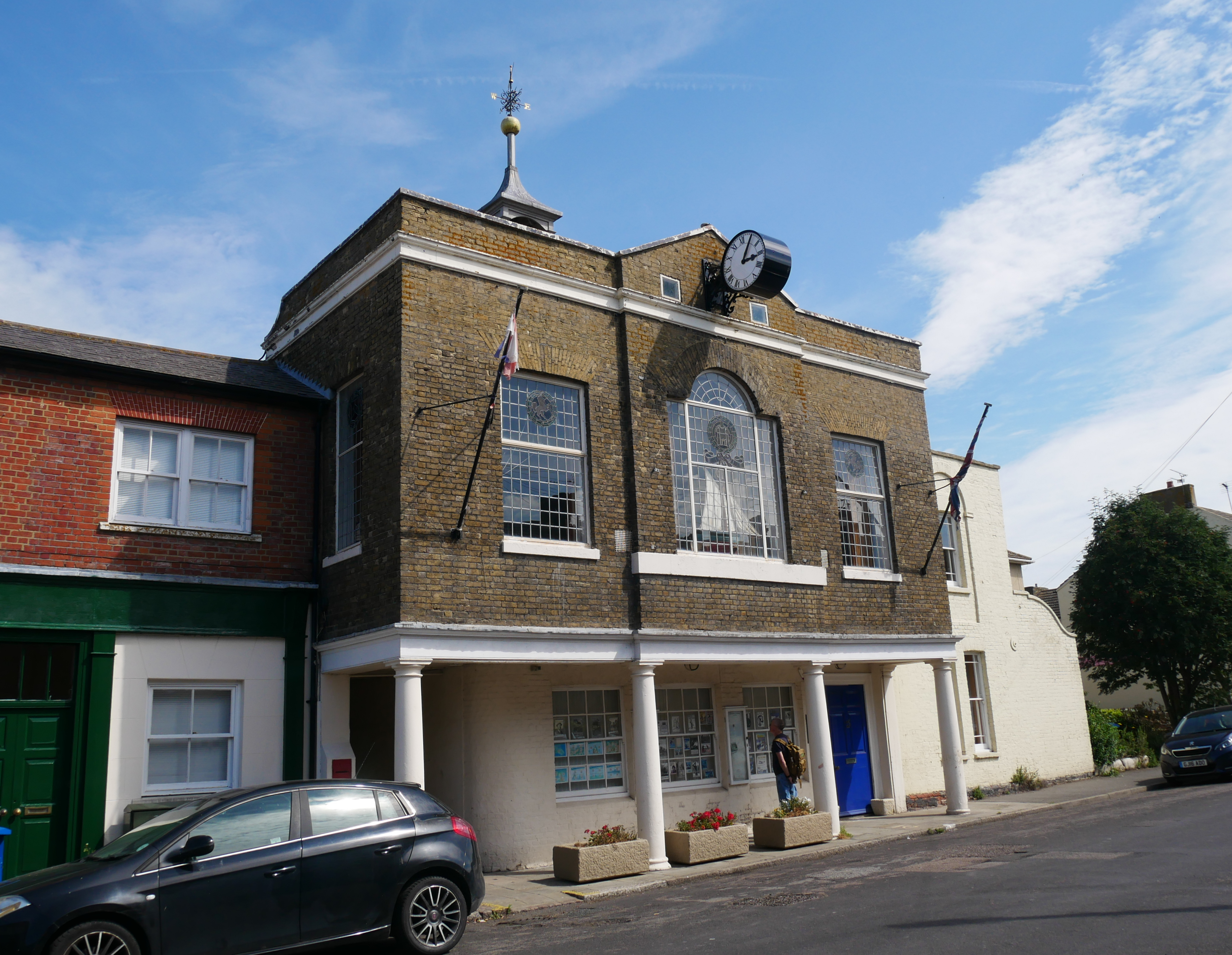
Queenborough Guildhall

Queenborough is in the parliamentary constituency of Sittingbourne and Sheppey. As of July 2024, the constituency's member of parliament is Kevin McKenna of the Labour Party.

Queenborough is within the Swale local government district and its electoral ward of Queenborough and Halfway. This ward has three of the forty seven seats on Swale Borough Council. As of the 2019 local elections, all three seats are held by the Conservative Party.

Queenborough continues the traditions of having a town council and a mayor. The town council is made up of eleven elected members, seven from Queenborough and four from Rushenden. The current mayor is Councillor Richard Darby.

== Demography ==
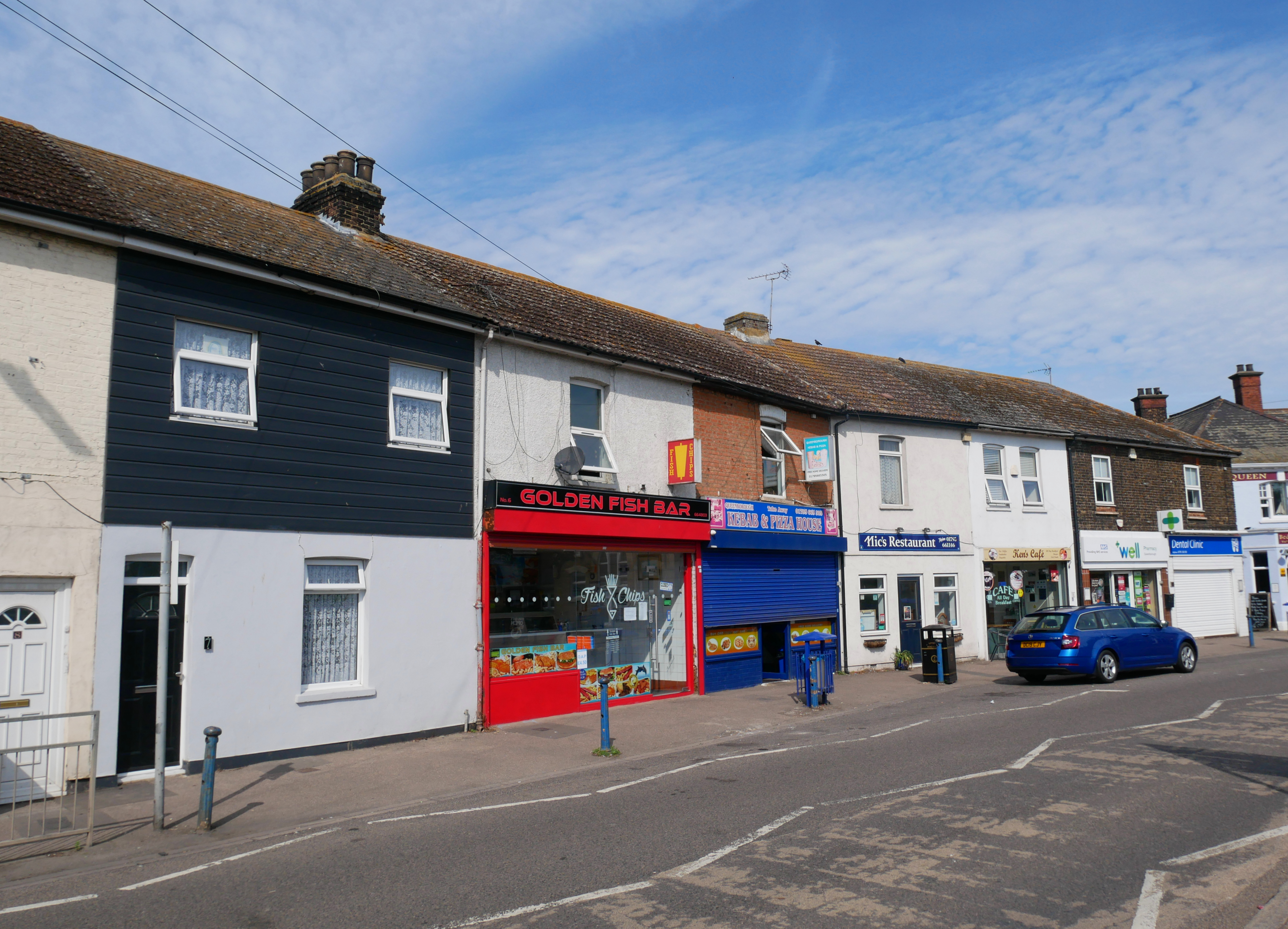
Buildings along Railway Terrace in Queenborough

Queenborough in the 2001 census
	Queenborough	Borough of Swale	England
Total population	3,471	122,801	49,138,831
Foreign born	2.8%	3.6%	9.2%
White	99%	98%	91%
Asian	0.4%	0.7%	4.6%
Black	0.3%	0.3%	2.3%
Christian	78%	76%	72%
Muslim	0.1%	0.4%	3.1%
No religion	15%	15%	15%
Over 65 years old	13%	16%	16%
Bachelor's degree or higher	7%	12%	20%

At the 2001 UK census, the parish of Queenborough had a population of 3,471.

For every 100 females, there were 94.5 males. The age distribution was 7% aged 0–4 years, 18% aged 5–15 years, 10% aged 16–24 years, 28% aged 25–44 years, 23% aged 45–64 years and 13% aged 65 years and over.

The ethnicity of the Queenborough and Halfway electoral ward, which includes the neighbouring villages of Minster-on-Sea, Rushenden and Halfway Houses, was 98.6% white, 0.7% mixed race, 0.3% black, 0.2% non-Chinese Asian and 0.3% Chinese or other.

The place of birth of Queenborough and Halfway residents was 97.2% United Kingdom, 0.6% Republic of Ireland, 0.4% Germany, 0.3% other Western Europe countries, 0.3% Far East, 0.3% Africa, 0.3% North America, 0.2% South Asia, 0.2% Oceania and 0.1% Middle East.

Religion was recorded as 77.6% Christian, 0.1% Muslim and 0.1% Jewish. 14.7% were recorded as having no religion, 0.3% had an alternative religion and 7.7% didn't state their religion.

7% of Queenborough and Halfway residents aged 16–74 had a bachelor's degree or higher, compared to 20% nationally.

== Economy ==
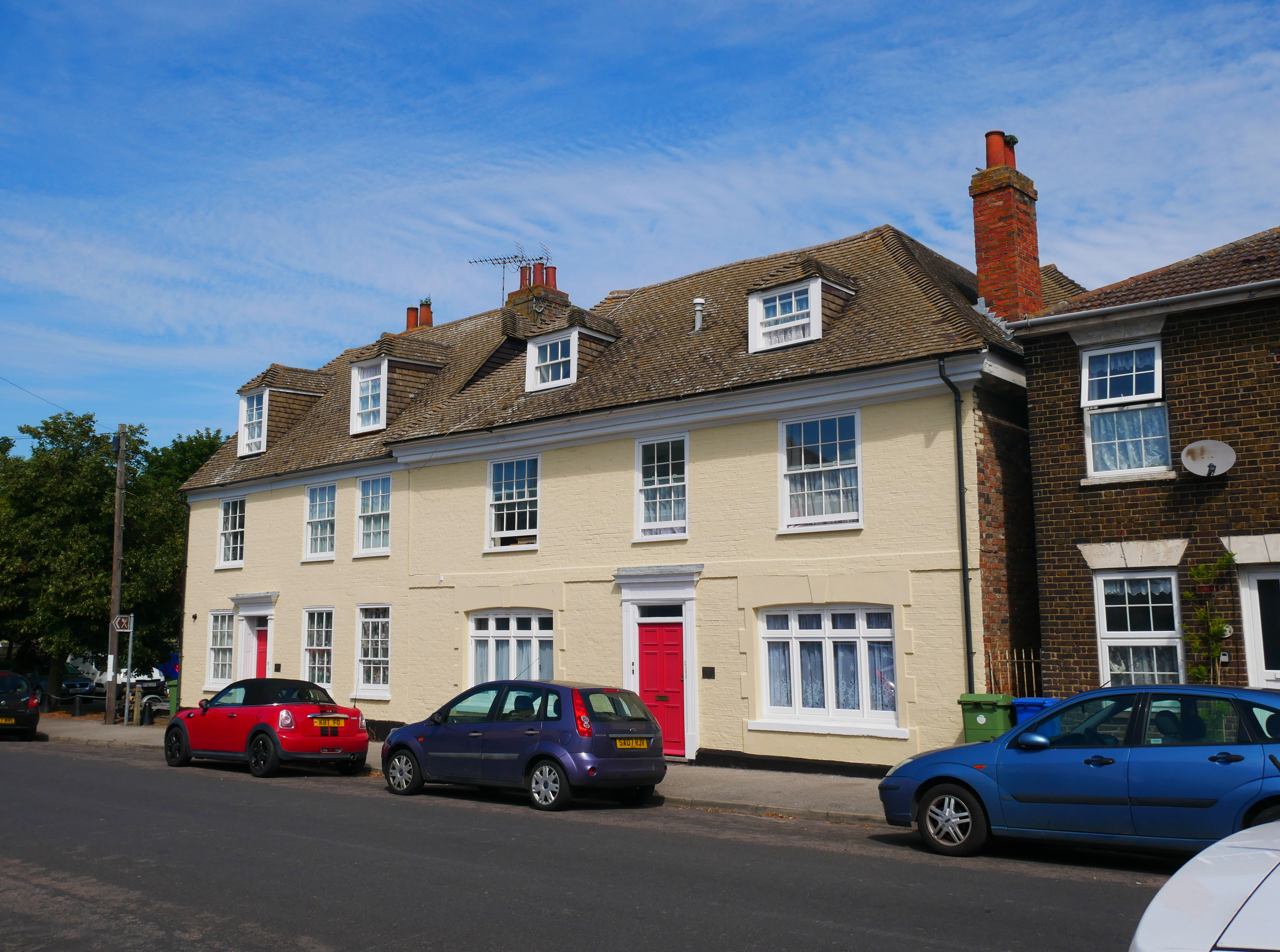
The eighteenth-century building at 20 and 22 High Street in Queenborough

In December 2023, the large pharmaceutical factory operated by Recipharm closed with the loss of 150 jobs. The town also previously played host to a steel rolling mill facility, but this closed in February 2013, with the site being bulldozed in October of that year. 80 people lost their jobs as a result. The site is in the process of being redeveloped for housing as part of a regeneration scheme.

At the 2001 UK census, the economic activity of residents aged 16–74 of Queenborough and its neighbouring villages of Minster-on-Sea, Rushenden and Halfway Houses was 42.0% in full-time employment, 12.7% in part-time employment, 7.1% self-employed, 3.4% unemployed, 1.5% students with jobs, 3.0% students without jobs, 14.6% retired, 8.0% looking after home or family, 5.3% permanently sick or disabled and 2.4% economically inactive for other reasons. The unemployment rate of 3.40% was similar to the national rate of 3.35%.

The industry of employment of residents was 24% manufacturing, 16% retail, 9% construction, 9% real estate, 10% transport & communications, 7% health & social work, 7% public administration, 5% education, 4% hotels & restaurants, 2% finance, 1% agriculture and 3% other community, social or personal services. Compared to national figures, the town had a relatively high percentage of workers in manufacturing, construction, public administration and transport & communications, and a relatively low percentage in agriculture, health & social work, education, finance and real estate.

== Media ==
Local news and television programmes are provided by BBC South East and ITV Meridian. Television signals are received from the Bluebell Hill TV transmitter on the North Downs.

The town is served by county-wide radio stations: BBC Radio Kent, Heart South, Gold Radio. Community radio based stations are BRFM 95.6 FM, and Sheppey FM 92.2.

The Sheerness Times Guardian is the local weekly newspaper.

== Transport links ==
=== Rail ===
Trains pass through Queenborough railway station on the Sheerness line between Sittingbourne, where the line links with the rest of the network, and Sheerness-on-Sea.

=== Sailing ===
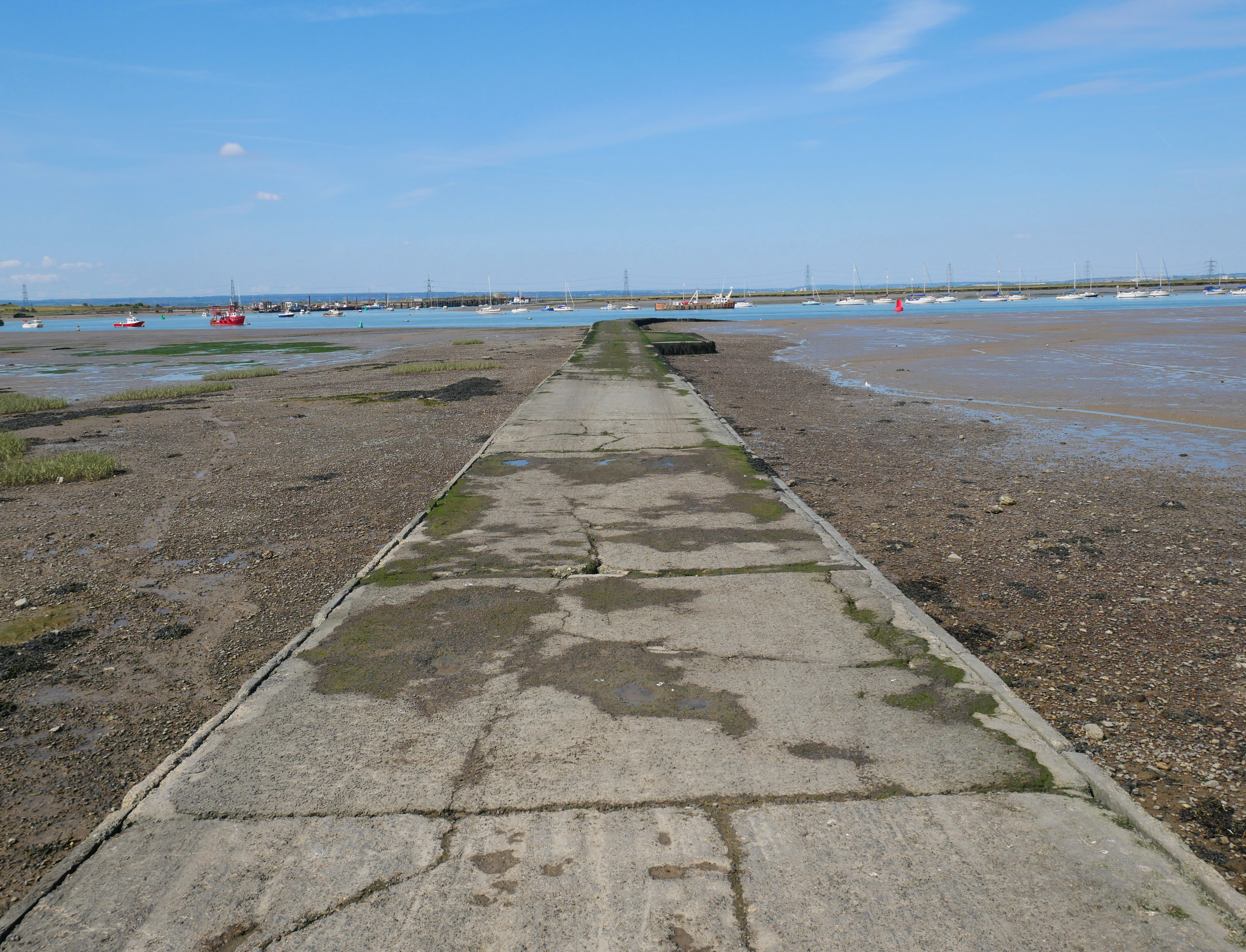
The slipway at Queenborough

The harbour and creek at Queenborough on the Isle of Sheppey has mooring facilities for a range of boats. There is an all-tide landing owned by Queenborough Harbour Trust situated on Crundells Wharf, which can be used by mooring holders and visiting yachtsmen.

== See also ==
- Queenborough (UK Parliament constituency)
- Brielle, The Netherlands (Sister city)
- Listed buildings in Queenborough
