= List of King George V Playing Fields in Kent =

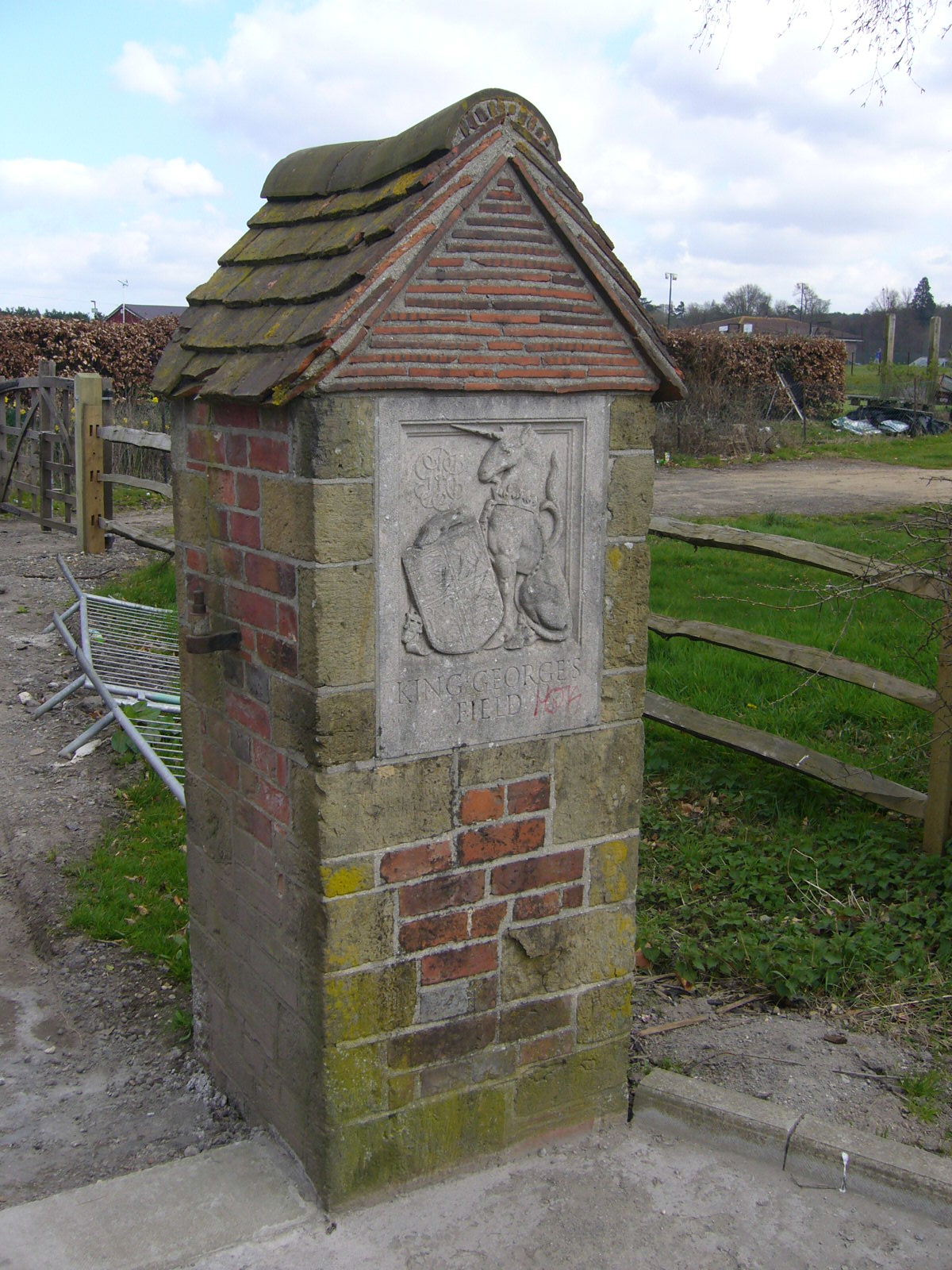
Westerham

Kent
| Location | Formal name | Local name (if any) | National Grid Reference | Dates | | External links |
| Location | Formal name | Local name (if any) | National Grid Reference | Purchase | Opening | External links |
|---|---|---|---|---|---|---|
| London Road, Faversham | King George V Recreation Ground | | TR 006 608 | | | swale.gov.uk photo |
| Loose Road, Maidstone | King George V Recreation Ground | | TQ 763 524 | | | |
| Castlemere Avenue, Queenborough | King George's Playing Field | | TQ 916 721 | | | swale.gov.uk |
| Park Avenue, Sittingbourne | King George V Playing Field | | TQ 900 623 | | | parksandgardens.org |
| Costells Meadow, Westerham | King George V Playing Field | | TQ 449 542 | | | |
| Spring Lane, Canterbury | King George's Field | Babs Hill | TR 161 575 | | | Charities Commission |
