= Minster, Swale =

Town on the Isle of Sheppey, Kent, England

Coordinates: 51.421°N 0.809°E

Minster
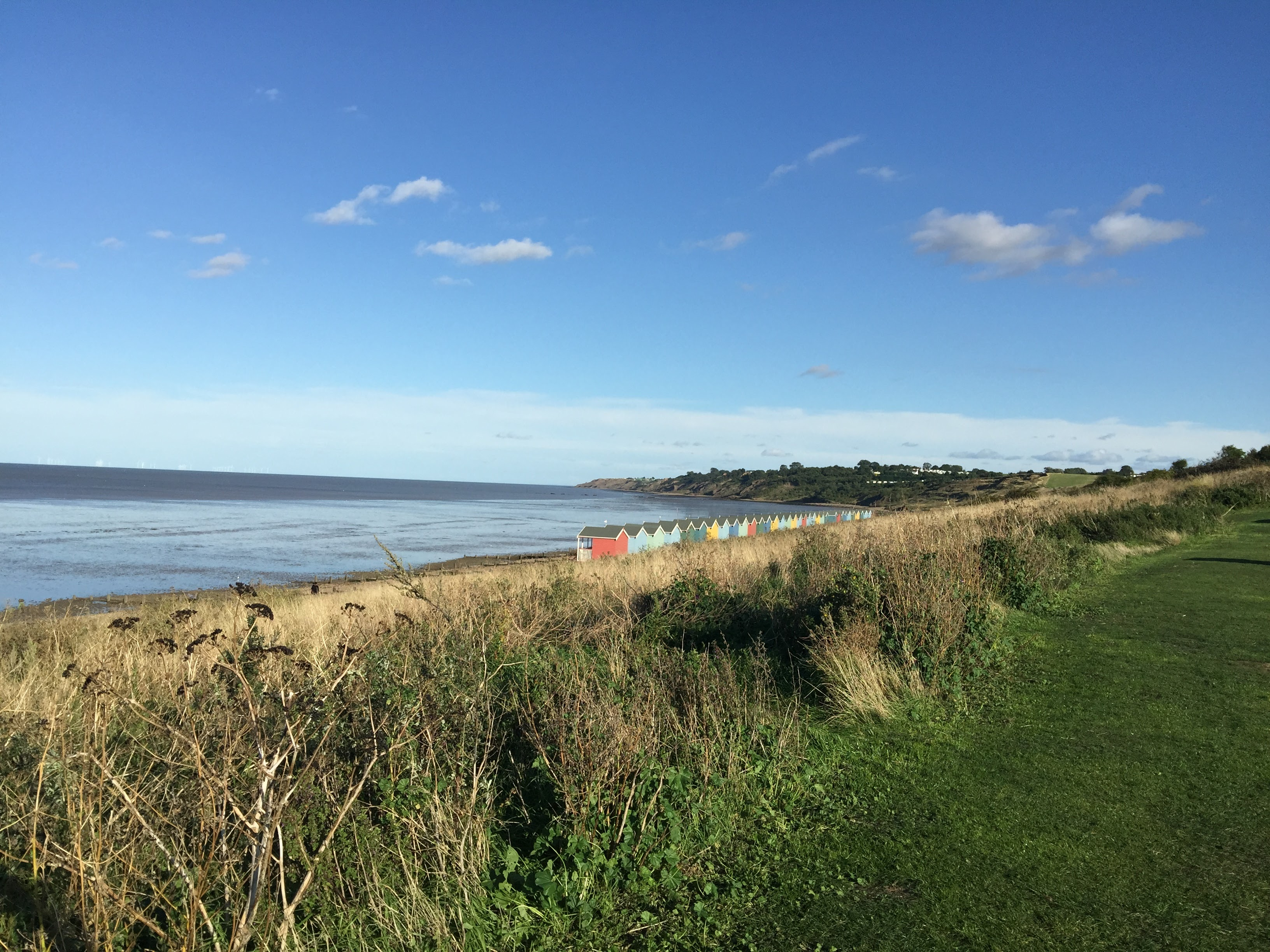
- Minster Leas

- Location within Kent
- Area: 5.28 km^{2} (2.04 sq mi)
- Population: 17,389 (2021 census)
  - Density: 3,293/km^{2} (8,530/sq mi)
- OS grid reference: TQ952729
- Civil parish: Minster-on-Sea
- District: Swale
- Shire county: Kent
- Region: South East
- Country: England
- Sovereign state: United Kingdom
- Post town: SHEERNESS
- Postcode district: ME12
- Dialling code: 01795
- Police: Kent
- Fire: Kent
- Ambulance: South East Coast
- UK Parliament: Sittingbourne and Sheppey

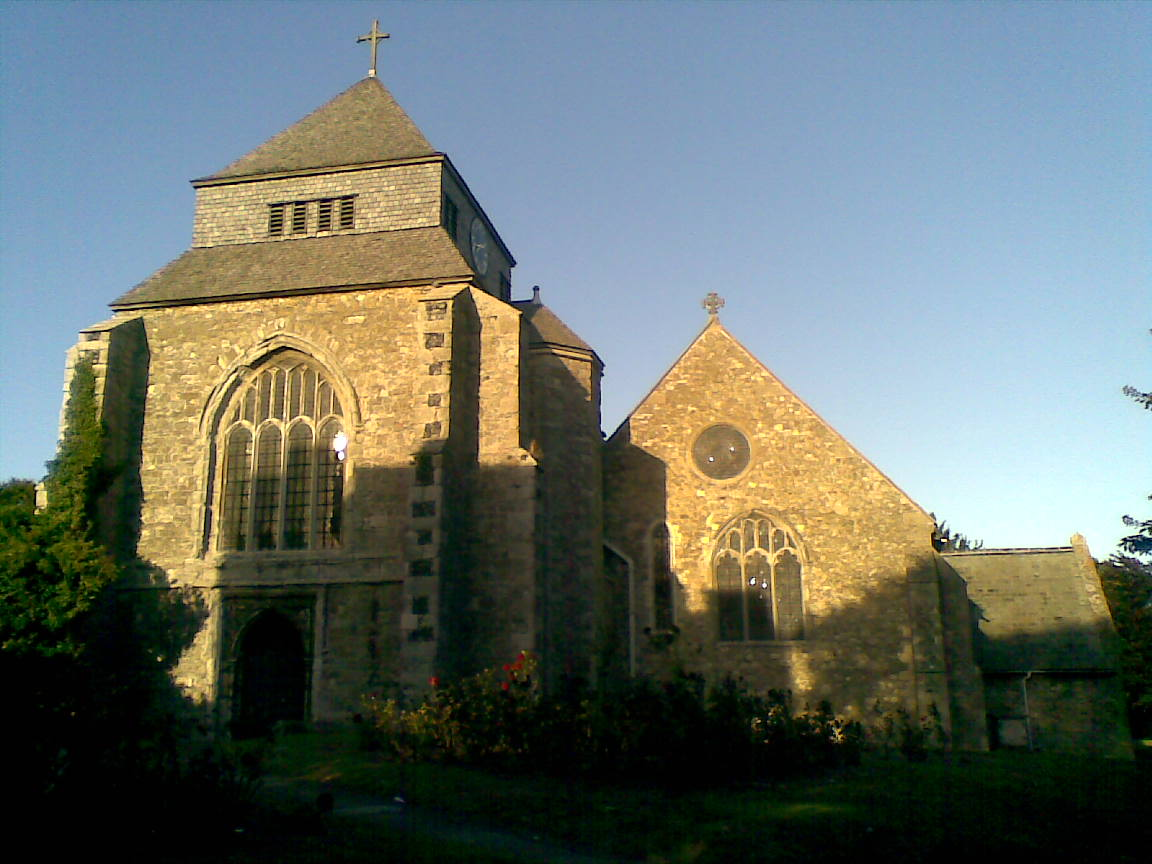
The abbey today

Minster is a town on the north coast of the Isle of Sheppey in Kent, south-east England. It is in the Swale administrative district, and within that, in the parish of Minster-on-Sea. According to the 2021 Census, the population of Minster was 17,389.

== Toponymy ==
The name of the town derives from the monastery founded in the area. There is some variation in the use of the name, with the local parish council being named Minster-on-Sea, while other sources, such as the local primary school, use Minster-in-Sheppey, in order to distinguish it from Minster-in-Thanet, also in the county of Kent. Both places are listed in the Ordnance Survey gazetteer as Minster. Royal Mail identifies a locality of Minster on Sea in the ME12 postcode district. Minster-on-Sea is a location mentioned in Dickens's The Old Curiosity Shop.

== Geography ==
The coast here consists of London Clay, and many fossil remains can be found along the beach after the waves have brought down the cliffs.

== Religious sites ==
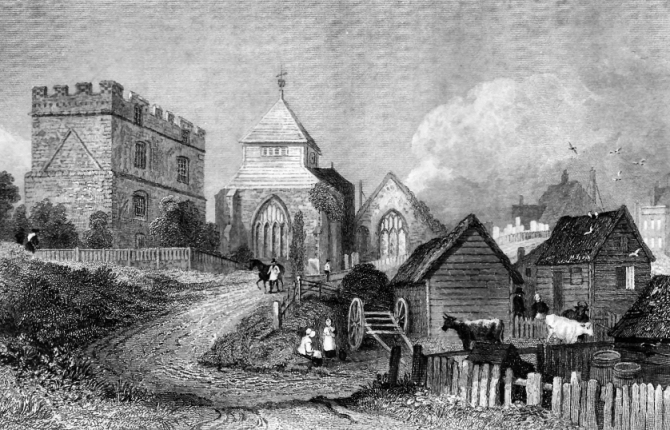
The abbey church and gatehouse: an 1830 engraving from William Ireland's History of Kent

In around AD 670 King Ecgberht of Kent gave land at Minster for his mother Seaxburh of Ely to establish a Benedictine nunnery, but this was burnt down by the Danes in 855. At some point before the Norman invasion the church was rebuilt and refounded as a Benedictine nunnery, incorporating elements of the original construction in the north chancel and nave. Between 1123 and 1139 Archbishop Corbeil (Corbeuil) refounded it as an Augustinian nunnery. Corbeil is thought to be responsible for the unusual "semi-detached" arrangement of two churches next to each other: the Saxon church of the convent to the north and a parish church to the south for the villagers. They share a wall containing pointed arches and are now used as a single building. The abbey was dissolved in 1539, and along with Davington Priory near Faversham it came into the possession of Sir Thomas Cheney (Cheyney/Cheyne), a favourite of Anne Boleyn. He died in 1558 and was first buried in the chapel of Saint Katherine, which was demolished to allow construction of the east end of the chancel in 1581.

Today the old abbey gatehouse is occupied by a museum run by the Sheppey Local History Society.

== Burials at the abbey ==
- Roger Northwode (d. 1286)
- Sir Robert de Shurland (d. 1324)
- Thomas Cheney (d. 1558)

The effigial monument of Robert de Shurland includes the sculpted head of a horse, and is closely associated with (and probably inspired) a local legend in which Sir Robert kills a priest; swims on horseback to beg the king (on board a ship) to pardon him for the murder; but on his return to shore kills his horse because an old woman predicts that it will be the cause of his death. Later encountering its bones, he kicks them in scorn, only for a shard to pierce his foot, causing an infection from which he dies. The tale takes elements from Italian, Slavic and Icelandic folklore (including the story of Oleg the Wise, and that of Örvar-Oddr). It was greatly popularised in a version published in 1837 by Richard Barham ("Thomas Ingoldsby"), as one of the Ingoldsby Legends.

== History ==
In the early 20th century the island was hit by speculative builders and Minster suffered equally with Sheerness. After the Second World War the population of the village had swollen "from about 250 people in 100 homes to 5,500 people in 1,800 homes".

During the Second World War the Shoeburyness Boom, which ran across the Thames Estuary to protect shipping from submarine attack, ran from Royal Oak Point (near Minster) to Shoeburyness in Essex. A similar structure was built along the same alignment in the early 1950s to protect against Soviet submarines. The Royal Oak Point end of the boom was demolished in the 1960s.

In 1961 the civil parish called "Minster in Sheppey" had a population of 7860. On 1 April 1968 the parish was abolished to form Queenborough in Sheppey.

== Education ==
Oasis Academy Isle of Sheppey is located over two sites in the area, and is the only secondary school on the Isle of Sheppey. In 2009 eleven pupils were hurt by the collapse of a heating duct during an exam at its predecessor, Minster College.

== Media ==
Local news and television programmes are provided by BBC South East and ITV Meridian. Television signals are received from the Bluebell Hill TV transmitter.

The town is served by county-wide radio stations: BBC Radio Kent, Heart South, Gold Radio. Community radio based stations are BRFM 95.6 FM, Sheppey FM 92.2 and Hospital Radio Swale which broadcasts from the Sheppey Community Hospital in the town.

The Sheerness Times Guardian is the local weekly newspaper.

== Minster Cricket Club ==
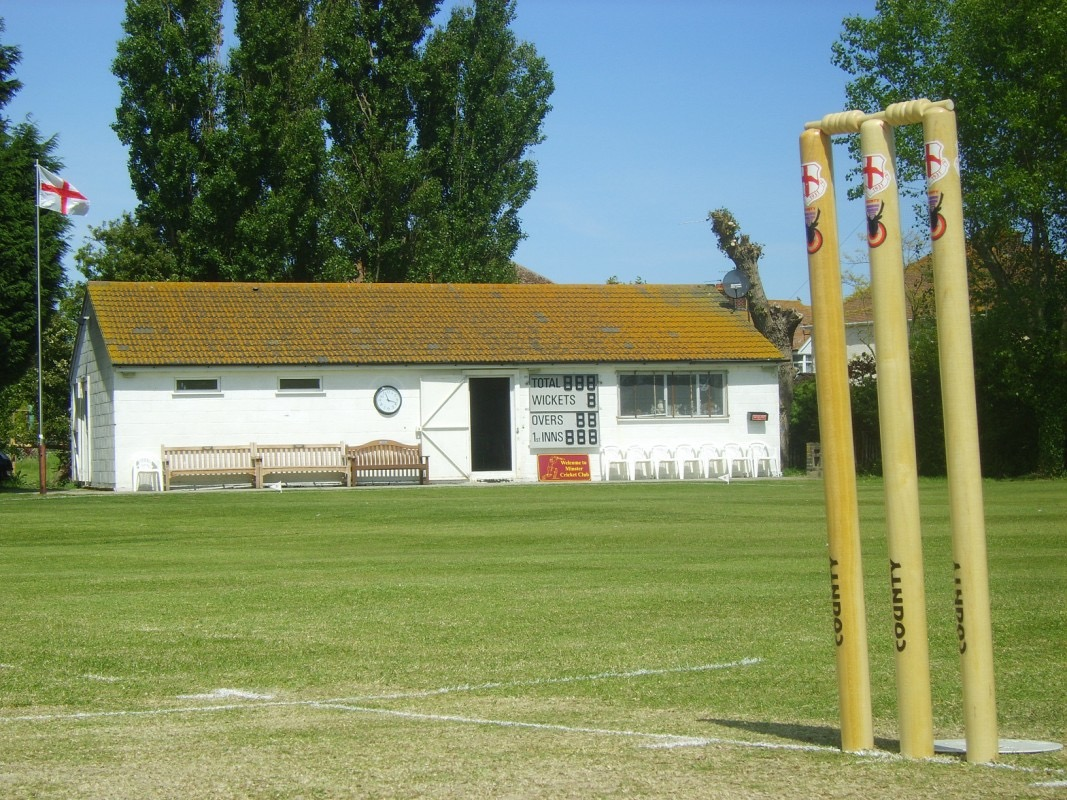
Minster Cricket Club pavilion

Minster Cricket Club play at Gilbert Hall near St. George's Primary School. The club was established in 1931 and is the largest on the Isle of Sheppey, fielding four senior teams for Saturday league cricket. The club also have a junior section with U16, U14, U12. Also U10 & U8 soft ball teams, two midweek cricket teams and a Sunday team. www.minstercricket.co.uk
