= Listed buildings in Minster-on-Sea, Kent =

Historic structures in Kent, England

Minster-on-Sea is a village and civil parish in the Swale District of Kent, England. It contains eleven listed buildings that are recorded in the National Heritage List for England. Of these two are grade I and nine are grade II.

This list is based on the information retrieved online from Historic England.

== Key ==
Grade	Criteria
I	Buildings that are of exceptional interest
II*	Particularly important buildings of more than special interest
II	Buildings that are of special interest

== Listing ==
Name	Grade	Location	Type	Completed (Note: The date given is the date used by Historic England as significant for the initial building or that of an important part in the structure's description.)	Date designated	Grid ref. (Note: The grid reference is based on the British national grid reference system, sometimes known as OSGB36, used by the Ordnance Survey.) Geo-coordinates	Notes	Entry number (Note: The "List Entry Number" is a unique number assigned to each listed building and scheduled monument by Historic England.)	Image	Wikidata
Bell Farm Park House and Club	II	Bell Farm Lane, Minster On Sea			30 June 1978	TQ9756573088; 51°25′20″N 0°50′25″E		1242944	Upload Photo	Q26535662
49, Chapel Street	II	49, Chapel Street, Minister On Sea			30 June 1978	TQ9587372917; 51°25′17″N 0°48′57″E		1258068	Upload Photo	Q26549354
Mill Hill House	II	Chequers Road, Minster On Sea			27 June 1963	TQ9642072712; 51°25′10″N 0°49′25″E		1259757	Upload Photo	Q26550850
Kingshill Farmhouse	II	Elmley			30 June 1978	TQ9386867909; 51°22′38″N 0°47′03″E		1258073	Upload Photo	Q26549359
Barn Adjoining Cattle Shed Immediately North of Kings Hill Farmhouse	II	Elmley Marshes			23 February 1989	TQ9386267985; 51°22′40″N 0°47′03″E		1243080	Upload Photo	Q26535788
The Abbey Church of St Mary and St Sexburga	I	High Street, Minster On Sea	church building		27 June 1963	TQ9560772985; 51°25′20″N 0°48′43″E		1273489	The Abbey Church of St Mary and St Sexburga More images	Q17530102
The Abbey Gatehouse	I	High Street, Minster On Sea	gatehouse		14 May 1952	TQ9556572998; 51°25′20″N 0°48′41″E		1258332	The Abbey Gatehouse More images	Q17530093
East End Farmhouse	II	Oak Lane, Minster On Sea			30 June 1978	TQ9677173188; 51°25′25″N 0°49′44″E		1258795	Upload Photo	Q26549997
Illogan	II	Oak Lane, Minster On Sea			30 June 1978	TQ9677873152; 51°25′24″N 0°49′44″E		1258796	Upload Photo	Q26549998
Parsonage Farmhouse	II	Parsonage Chase, Minster On Sea			27 June 1963	TQ9392172306; 51°25′00″N 0°47′15″E		1273264	Upload Photo	Q26563024
Scocles Court	II	Scocles Road, Minster On Sea			30 June 1978	TQ9501571958; 51°24′47″N 0°48′11″E		1258878	Upload Photo	Q26550069

== See also ==
- Grade I listed buildings in Kent
- Grade II* listed buildings in Kent

== Sources ==
- Newman, John (2013) [1969], Kent: North-East and East, The Buildings of England, New Haven and London: Yale University Press, ISBN 978-0-300-18506-5
