= Listed buildings in Queenborough =

Historic structures in Kent, England

Queenborough is a village and civil parish in the Swale District of Kent, England. It contains 23 listed buildings that are recorded in the National Heritage List for England. Of these one is grade II* and 22 are grade II.

This list is based on the information retrieved online from Historic England.

== Key ==
Grade	Criteria
I	Buildings that are of exceptional interest
II*	Particularly important buildings of more than special interest
II	Buildings that are of special interest

== Listing ==
Name	Grade	Location	Type	Completed (Note: The date given is the date used by Historic England as significant for the initial building or that of an important part in the structure's description.)	Date designated	Grid ref. (Note: The grid reference is based on the British national grid reference system, sometimes known as OSGB36, used by the Ordnance Survey.) Geo-coordinates	Notes	Entry number (Note: The "List Entry Number" is a unique number assigned to each listed building and scheduled monument by Historic England.)	Image	Wikidata
3, High Street	II	3, High Street			30 June 1978	TQ9068272210; 51°25′01″N 0°44′27″E		1258380	Upload Photo	Q26549620
5, High Street	II	5, High Street			30 June 1978	TQ9068872212; 51°25′01″N 0°44′27″E		1258333	Upload Photo	Q26549580
The Castle Inn	II	7, High Street			30 June 1978	TQ9069572213; 51°25′01″N 0°44′28″E		1258384	Upload Photo	Q26549623
9, High Street	II	9, High Street			30 June 1978	TQ9070272215; 51°25′01″N 0°44′28″E		1258388	Upload Photo	Q26549627
20, High Street	II	20, High Street			19 October 1951	TQ9072872244; 51°25′02″N 0°44′30″E		1258416	Upload Photo	Q26549651
22, High Street	II	22, High Street			19 October 1951	TQ9073772246; 51°25′02″N 0°44′30″E		1258418	Upload Photo	Q26549653
Evans Row	II	51-65, High Street			30 June 1978	TQ9082372243; 51°25′01″N 0°44′34″E		1273461	Upload Photo	Q26563206
72 and 74, High Street	II	72 and 74, High Street			30 June 1978	TQ9087572280; 51°25′03″N 0°44′37″E		1366013	Upload Photo	Q26647648
Church House	II	76, High Street			19 October 1951	TQ9089072282; 51°25′03″N 0°44′38″E		1258420	Upload Photo	Q26549655
77, High Street	II	77, High Street			19 October 1951	TQ9088772257; 51°25′02″N 0°44′38″E		1258335	Upload Photo	Q26549582
79 and 81, High Street	II	79 and 81, High Street			19 October 1951	TQ9089272260; 51°25′02″N 0°44′38″E		1258410	Upload Photo	Q26549645
83-91, High Street	II	83-91, High Street			19 October 1951	TQ9090772261; 51°25′02″N 0°44′39″E		1366012	Upload Photo	Q26647647
Fig Tree House	II	108, High Street			30 June 1978	TQ9096572275; 51°25′02″N 0°44′42″E		1258502	Upload Photo	Q26549729
121, High Street	II	121, High Street			30 June 1978	TQ9100872232; 51°25′01″N 0°44′44″E		1258412	Upload Photo	Q26549647
149 and 151, High Street	II	149 and 151, High Street			19 October 1951	TQ9107872217; 51°25′00″N 0°44′48″E		1258414	Upload Photo	Q26549649
161 and 163, High Street	II	161 and 163, High Street			22 August 1986	TQ9110872202; 51°25′00″N 0°44′49″E		1243182	Upload Photo	Q26535872
167, High Street	II	167, High Street			30 June 1978	TQ9112472192; 51°24′59″N 0°44′50″E		1258415	Upload Photo	Q26549650
Mill House	II	High Street			30 June 1978	TQ9100672256; 51°25′02″N 0°44′44″E		1258504	Upload Photo	Q26549731
Monument to Greet Family in Churchyard of Holy Trinity Parish Church	II	High Street	monument		30 June 1978	TQ9093172288; 51°25′03″N 0°44′40″E		1258501	Monument to Greet Family in Churchyard of Holy Trinity Parish Church More images	Q26549728
Parish Church of the Holy Trinity	II*	High Street	church building		19 October 1951	TQ9091772306; 51°25′03″N 0°44′39″E		1258500	Parish Church of the Holy Trinity More images	Q17546407
The Vicarage	II	High Street			30 June 1978	TQ9099672258; 51°25′02″N 0°44′43″E		1258503	Upload Photo	Q26549730
Town Hall	II	High Street	city hall		19 October 1951	TQ9079472263; 51°25′02″N 0°44′33″E		1258419	Town Hall More images	Q26549654
Swale House	II	West Street			30 June 1978	TQ9067972148; 51°24′59″N 0°44′27″E		1243155	Upload Photo	Q26535854

== See also ==
- Grade I listed buildings in Kent
- Grade II* listed buildings in Kent

== Sources ==
- Newman, John (2013) [1969], Kent: North-East and East, The Buildings of England, New Haven and London: Yale University Press, ISBN 978-0-300-18506-5
