= Queenborough Guildhall =

Municipal building in Queenborough, Kent, England

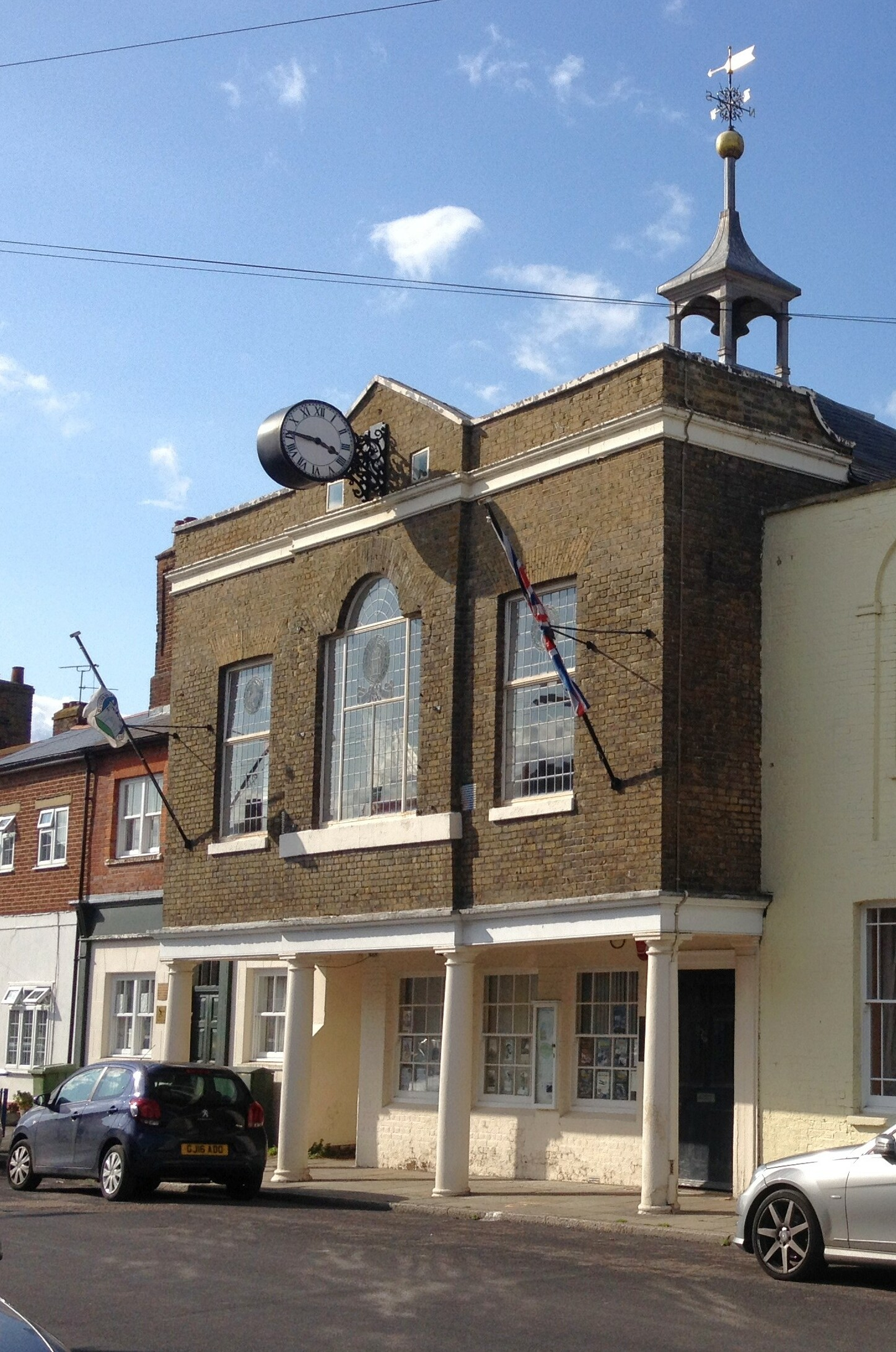
- Queenborough Guildhall

- Shown in Kent
- 51.4172°N 0.7425°E
- Location: High Street, Queenborough

History
- Built: 1793

Site notes
- Architectural style: Neoclassical style

Listed Building – Grade II
- Official name: Town Hall
- Designated: 19 October 1951
- Reference no.: 1258419

Queenborough Guildhall is a former municipal building in the High Street in Queenborough, Kent, England. The structure, which is currently used as a museum, is a Grade II listed building.

== History ==
The first municipal building in Queenborough was a medieval market house: it was open on the ground floor, so that markets could be held, with an assembly room for civic meetings and court hearings on the first floor. The market house was surrendered when the town was briefly captured by Dutch forces during the raid on the Medway in June 1667. There was no mention of Queenborough in the Treaty of Breda and a tradition was subsequently established that the market house had never formally been handed back to the town.

The market house was demolished and replaced by a new guildhall in 1728: this building was deemed by civic officials to project out too far into the High Street and they decided to demolish it in the late 18th century. The current building was designed in the neoclassical style, built in yellow brick and was completed in 1793. The design involved a symmetrical main frontage with three bays facing onto the High Street; the ground floor was arcaded with four Tuscan order columns supporting the floor above. The central bay, which slightly projected forward, contained a Venetian window on the first floor and a parapet and a small pediment above. The outer bays were fenestrated with casement windows on the first floor. There was a projecting clock on the front of the building and, at roof level, there was a cupola with a weather vane. Internally, the principal rooms were the courtroom on the first floor and the dungeon, which contained two cells, each of about 12 square feet (1.1 m^{2}), in the basement.

Queenborough had a very small electorate and a dominant patron (the Duke of Wellington), which meant it was recognised by the UK Parliament as a rotten borough: the right of the borough to elect members of parliament was removed by the Reform Act 1832. The borough council, which continued to meet in the guildhall, was reformed under the Municipal Corporations Act 1883.

A public inquiry into proposals from Colonel H. F. Stephens for a light railway from Queenborough to Leysdown-on-Sea was held in the guildhall in April 1898. As part of celebrations associated with the initiation of the Queenborough and Brielle twinning project, a ceremony was held at the guildhall at which Dutch officials formally handed back the building, after 300 years of apparent Dutch occupation of the site, in June 1967. The building continued to serve as the meeting place of the borough council for much of the 20th century, but ceased to be the local seat of government when Swale Borough Council was formed in Sittingbourne in 1974. It was subsequently converted into a local history museum: the collection included a variety of exhibits associated with the minesweeper squadron which had been based at the town during the Second World War.

Works of art in the guildhall include portraits of former mayors, including Thomas Young Greet, who was mayor of the town in the early 19th century.
