= Sheppey FM 92.2 =

English community radio station

Coordinates: 51.44155059477989°N 0.7638930004047555°E

- Sheerness, Kent; England
- Broadcast area: Isle of Sheppey, United Kingdom; Online via Radioplayer
- Frequency: 92.2 MHz

Programming
- Language: English
- Format: Community radio

Ownership
- Owner: Sheppey Matters

History
- First air date: 2012 (online); April 2017 (FM)

Links
- Website: sheppeyfm.org.uk

Sheppey FM 92.2 is an English community radio station and training centre on the Isle of Sheppey in Kent.

== History ==
The station began as an internet station in 2012, and was awarded an FM licence by Ofcom in 2016. It began broadcasting on FM in April 2017.

== Accolades ==
Volunteers at the station have been honoured by the crown. The station has been recognised at the Community Radio Awards, named Bronze "Station of the Year". Prince Charles and the Duchess of Cornwall visited the station, based in Sheerness' Heritage Pavilion's "Sheppey Community Media Centre" in February 2022.

== See also ==
- BRFM 95.6 FM
