= Minster-on-Sea =

Civil parish in Swale, Kent, England

Coordinates: 51.41°N 0.8°E

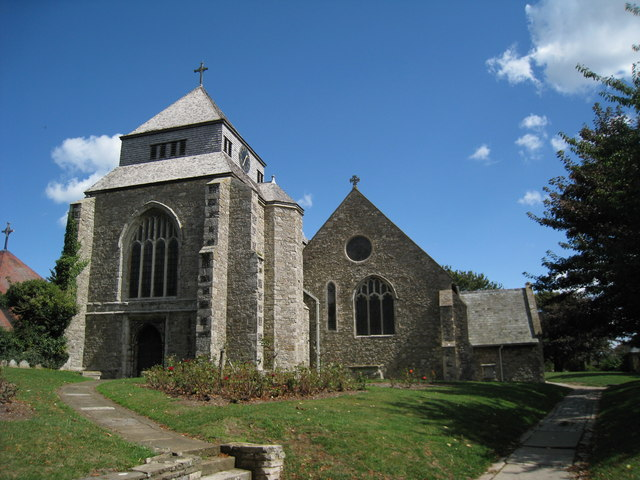
- Minster Abbey, Minster-on-Sea

- Location within Kent
- Interactive map of Minster-on-Sea
- Area: 30.31 km^{2} (11.70 sq mi)
- Population: 17,392 (2021 census)
  - Density: 574/km^{2} (1,490/sq mi)
- Civil parish: Minster-on-Sea
- District: Swale
- Shire county: Kent
- Region: South East
- Country: England
- Sovereign state: United Kingdom

Minster-on-Sea is a civil parish in the English county of Kent. It is on the Isle of Sheppey and thus forms part of the borough of Swale. It was created on 1 April 2003. In 2021 it had a population of 17,392.

The main populated area is the seaside town of Minster on the north coast. The southern part is primarily marshland and includes the entirely deserted village of Elmley.

Despite being 60km from Central London, it is possible to see The Shard from certain areas in the parish.

== See also ==
- Listed buildings in Minster-on-Sea, Kent
