= Oasis Academy Isle of Sheppey =

Location
- Minster Road; Minster-on-Sea, Kent, ME12 3JQ; England; 51.4205°N 0.7853°E

Information
- Type: Academy
- Established: 1 September 2009
- Closed: 31 August 2024
- Trust: OCL- Oasis Multi-academy Trust
- Department for Education URN: 135721 Tables
- Ofsted: Reports
- Principal: John Cavadino
- Gender: Coeducational
- Age: 11 to 18
- Enrolment: 1337as of February 2021
- Capacity: 2450
- Website: www.oasisacademyisleofsheppey.org

Oasis Academy Isle of Sheppey was a coeducational secondary school and sixth form with academy status, located over two sites in Minster-on-Sea on the Isle of Sheppey in the English county of Kent. It is currently managed by the Oasis Community Learning Multi-academy Trust.

== History ==
The Isle of Sheppey Academy, was formed from the merger of Cheyne Middle School and Minster College on 1 September 2009, and is still located at both of the former school sites, although the buildings were redeveloped in 2013. The school was previously sponsored by Dulwich College, the Diocese of Canterbury and Kent County Council, however the school joined the Oasis Trust group of academies in January 2014, and was renamed Oasis Academy Isle of Sheppey.

== Description ==
Oasis Academy Isle of Sheppey was larger than the average-sized secondary school. The majority of pupils are of White British background. The proportion of pupils who are disadvantaged (economically disadvantaged) is above the national average for secondary schools. The proportion of pupils with SEND is well above the national average for secondary schools.

Oasis Academy Sheppey was part of the Oasis Community Learning group, and evangelical Christian charity. The trust have guided forty schools out of special measures. 19 per cent of the 52 Oasis academies classified as failing. The trust's founder Reverend Steve Chalke says "Turning round a school is sometimes a quick fix, it really, truly is. And sometimes it's a really long, hard, hard job".

When the schools merged September 2009 the lead sponsor was Dulwich College. There were 2136 students. The first attempt was to divide the estate down into 5 mini-school- this did not work as it couldn't support 5 separate sixth-forms and in 2011, it remained an academy that 'Required Improvement'. In December 2011 there was a full inspection, and the school was placed under special measures. There had been a slight improvement however Pupils' attainment, the quality of pupils' learning and their progress, the quality of learning for pupils with special educational needs and/or disabilities and their progress were all judged as inadequate, and management hadn't the capacity to turn this round.

In February 2013, the academy took possession of new building on the east and west site, it was taken out of special measure by Ofsted that judged that they 'Required Improvement' in every category. Dulwich explained that their teachers did not have the skills needed to affect change in the public sector. Subsequently, it was decided to change sponsor to the controversial but effective evangelical Christian multi-academy trust Oasis Community Learning, the head and staff would move over to the new sponsors, and Ofsted did two more Section 8 Inspections to oversee the change.

Ofsted was very supportive of the restructuring and changes. However, over the next seven years, the attendance, behavior and performance did not change. There were three separate ofsted- each rating the school as 'Requires Improvement' In 2017, a principal called John Cavadino tried the draconian zero-tolerance approach- the behaviour passport. That just achieved negative publicity.

== Strategy ==
Oasis has a long-term strategy for enhancing the performance of its schools. It has devised a standard curriculum, that each school can safely adopt knowing it will deliver the National Curriculum. It has invests in staff training so they are focused on improving the outcomes for the students, and through its Horizons scheme it is providing each member of staff and student with a tablet. On the Isle of Sheppey this means 1950 iPads have been purchased at the cost of 600,000 pounds. Swale has 2334 single parent families living in absolute poverty.

== Academics ==
=== Secondary curriculum ===
Virtually all maintained schools and academies follow the National Curriculum, and there success is judged on how well they succeed in delivering a 'broad and balanced curriculum'. Schools endeavour to get all students to achieve the English Baccalaureate(qualification- this must include core subjects a modern or ancient foreign language, and either History or Geography.

The academy operates a three-year, Key Stage 3 where all the core National Curriculum subjects are taught. This is a transition period from primary to secondary education, that builds on the skills, knowledge and understanding gained at primary school, and introduces youngsters who are starting from a lower than average base to wider, robust and challenging programmes of study needed to gain qualifications at Key Stage 4.

At Key Stage 4 the focus is on the English Baccalaureate, and there are daily maths, English and science lessons, plus some options. Spanish is the taught modern language.

Lessons all follow the same structure. A immediate activity, to get the students focused and allow the teacher 'set up time'. The body of the lesson uses the tag: I do, we do, you do.

I do
is the teacher exposition, where the students are expected to 'SLANT'.
We do
is where the teacher teaches by question and answer with the student.
You do
is where the students work through examples on their own.

The lesson is concluded with a plenary, where students are reminded of what they have learnt and to celebrate their achievements. SLANT is sit up, lean forward, ask and answer questions, nod your head and track the speaker. It offers GCSEs and BTECs as programmes of study for pupils, while students in the sixth form have the option to study from a range of A Levels and further BTECs. The school also has a specialism in Business and Enterprise.

== Governance ==
OCL- Oasis Community Learning is a multi-academy sponsor that is legally responsible for 48 Oasis Academies. The national trust discharges its duties through regional directors. Local governance is delivered through an Academy Council.

== Campuses (sites) ==
There was a Minster Campus and a Sheerness Campus.The project costed 54 million pounds was part of the Kent Building Schools for the Future programme, as the academy was specialised in business, enterprise and sport the facilities will also include a media suite and dance studios.The contractor was Kier. It is built to renewable energy standards aimed at reducing emissions by 60% compared with 2002 building regulations.

== Former schools ==
From 1970 Sheppey and the Hoo Peninsula operated a three tier system, with first schools, middle schools and a non-selective 14 to 19 upper school. When this was abolished the island was left with a legacy of unsuitable (and un-economic ) buildings.

=== Cheyne Middle School ===
The Cheyne Middle school was a large middle school deemed secondary. In 2009, it was claimed to be the largest middle school in the country.

== Events ==
In 2011, a large children's Adventure Play Area was opened in Barton's Point Coastal Park. It was designed by children from the school and built with funding (£87,000) from the Big Lottery.

== Closure ==
Following a decade of "Inadequate" and "Requires Improvement" Ofsted ratings, Oasis Academy Isle of Sheppey was officially closed on 31 August 2024. The Department for Education implemented a "two-school solution" to address systemic issues with attendance and student safety. The academy's two campuses were re-established as independent institutions: the Minster site became Leigh Academy Minster, managed by the Leigh Academies Trust with an academic focus, while the Sheerness site became EKC Sheppey Secondary, managed by the EKC Schools Trust with a focus on technical and vocational pathways. This transition marked the first time the Oasis Community Learning trust has fully exited a school due to a mutual agreement with the government.
