= Rushenden =

Village in Kent, England

Coordinates: 51.41°N 0.74°E

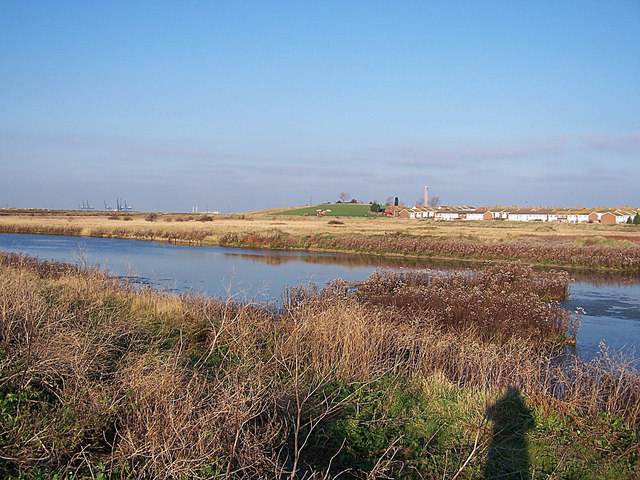
- Rushenden Marsh, looking back towards Rushenden Hill and Rushenden Village

- Location within Kent
- District: Swale
- Shire county: Kent
- Region: South East
- Country: England
- Sovereign state: United Kingdom
- Post town: Queenborough
- Postcode district: ME11
- Dialling code: 01795
- Police: Kent
- Fire: Kent
- Ambulance: South East Coast
- UK Parliament: Sittingbourne and Sheppey

Rushenden is a village on the Isle of Sheppey in the Borough of Swale in Kent, England, of approximately 500 dwellings. It lies to the south of Queenborough (where, at the 2011 Census, the population was included). A railway spur line formerly passed through the village to a former wharf on the Swale, although this has now been removed to make way for part of the regeneration scheme.

== Regeneration ==
The masterplan for Queenborough and Rushenden (created in 2003) represents an “exemplar for other masterplanning projects in the Thames Gateway” (South East Regional Design Panel May 2006).

The plan includes a Green Charter and Arts strategy which aims to ensure that the development addresses sustainability as well as using art to act as the “glue” that binds the community together with its surrounding landscape.

The masterplan (by Homes and Communities Agency with Swale Council) sets out a comprehensive approach to regenerating Queenborough and Rushenden. It involves harnessing its setting, history and people, and combining with them proposals for housing, employment, community facilities and recreation.

The vision for the masterplan creates a mixed-use development with the potential to support:

- 1,800 new homes, split 50/50 between family housing and apartments, rated as Code Level 4 increasing to zero carbon
- Up to 180,000 square metres of new employment space with the ability to support over 1,000 new jobs
- Up to 20 hectares of brownfield land remediated
- 180 berth marina and community water space facility
- Improved public realm
- Provision of new community/educational Facilities
- 1.5 km of new strategic infrastructure
- Development of a combined heat and power plant (CHP).

The regeneration plan will cost up to £400 million.
