= BRFM 95.6 FM =

Coordinates: 51.42350°N 0.8307°E

95.6 BRFM
- England
- Broadcast area: Isle of Sheppey
- Frequency: 95.6 MHz

Ownership
- Owner: Bridge Radio Limited

History
- First air date: 30 October 2006

Links
- Website: brfm.net

95.6 BRFM is a community radio station serving the Isle of Sheppey in Kent which launched on 30 October 2006.

The station broadcasts 24 hours a day on 95.6 FM.

== History ==
BRFM began broadcasting in 2004 as an online station serving Sheppey. After many restricted service licences and trials, the station was granted a community licence by OFCOM in 2006, and began broadcasting later that year.

The licence was extended in 2011 by another five years.

== Location ==
95.6 BRFM broadcasts from studios in Minster called "Windy Ridge" which is located on a cliff top in Oak Lane. The transmitter is also located on the site.
