= Swale railway station =

Railway station in north Kent, England

Coordinates: 51°23′21″N 0°44′50″E

Swale
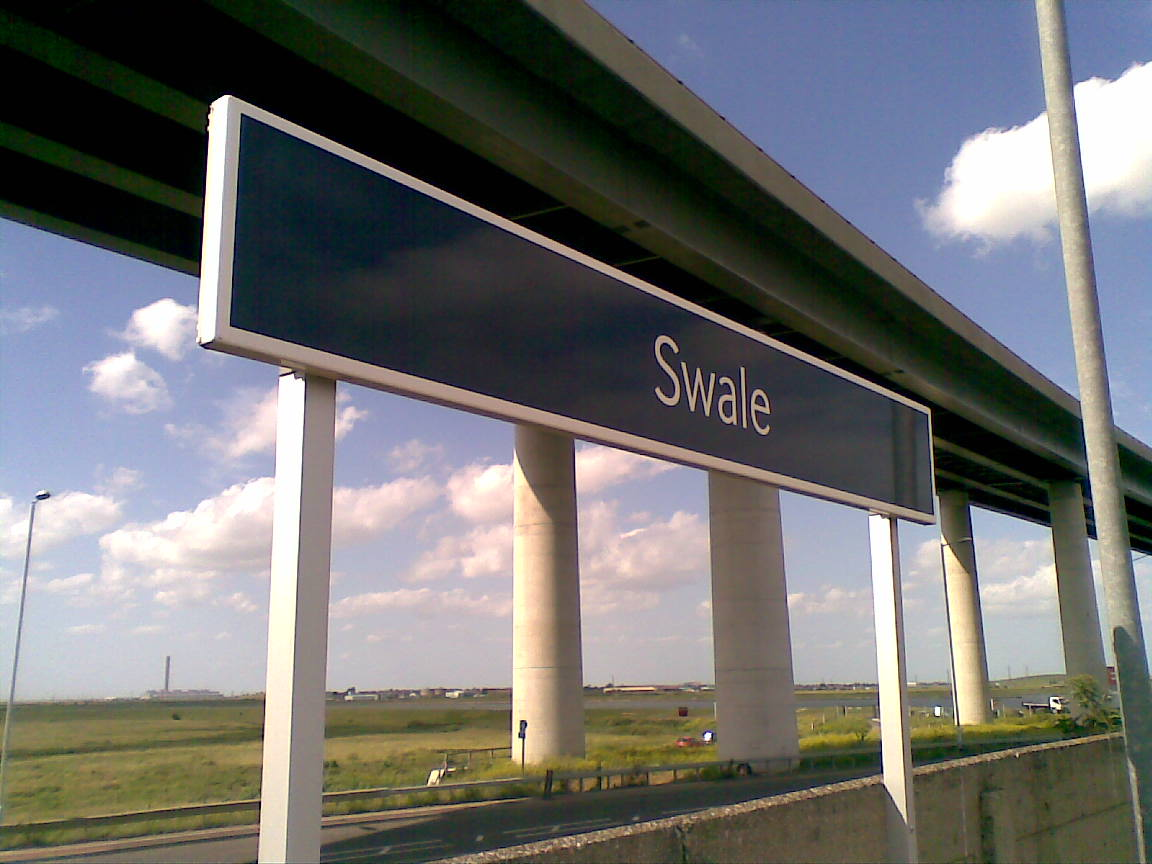
- Swale Station with the Sheppey Crossing in the background

General information
- Location: Kingsferry Bridge, Iwade, Swale; England
- Grid reference: TQ912691
- Manager: Southeastern
- Platforms: 1

Other information
- Station code: SWL
- Classification: DfT category F2

Key dates
- 25 November 1913: Staff halt opened as Kings Ferry Bridge Halt
- December 1922: Opened to passengers as Kings Ferry Bridge South Halt
- 1 November 1923: Renamed Kings Ferry Bridge Halt
- 1929: Renamed Swale Halt
- 20 April 1960: New station opened on different site

Passengers
- 2021/22: ▲10,154
- 2022/23: ▲11,280
- 2023/24: ▼8,014
- 2024/25: ▼7,300
- 2025/26: ▲9,772
Location
Notes
- Passenger statistics from the Office of Rail and Road

Swale railway station is in north Kent, England, on the Sheerness Line 47 miles 15 chains (75.9 km) from London Victoria, at the southern end of the Kingsferry Bridge which, along with the more modern Sheppey Crossing, connects the Isle of Sheppey to mainland Kent. The nearest settlement is Iwade. Train services are provided by Southeastern.

== Facilities ==
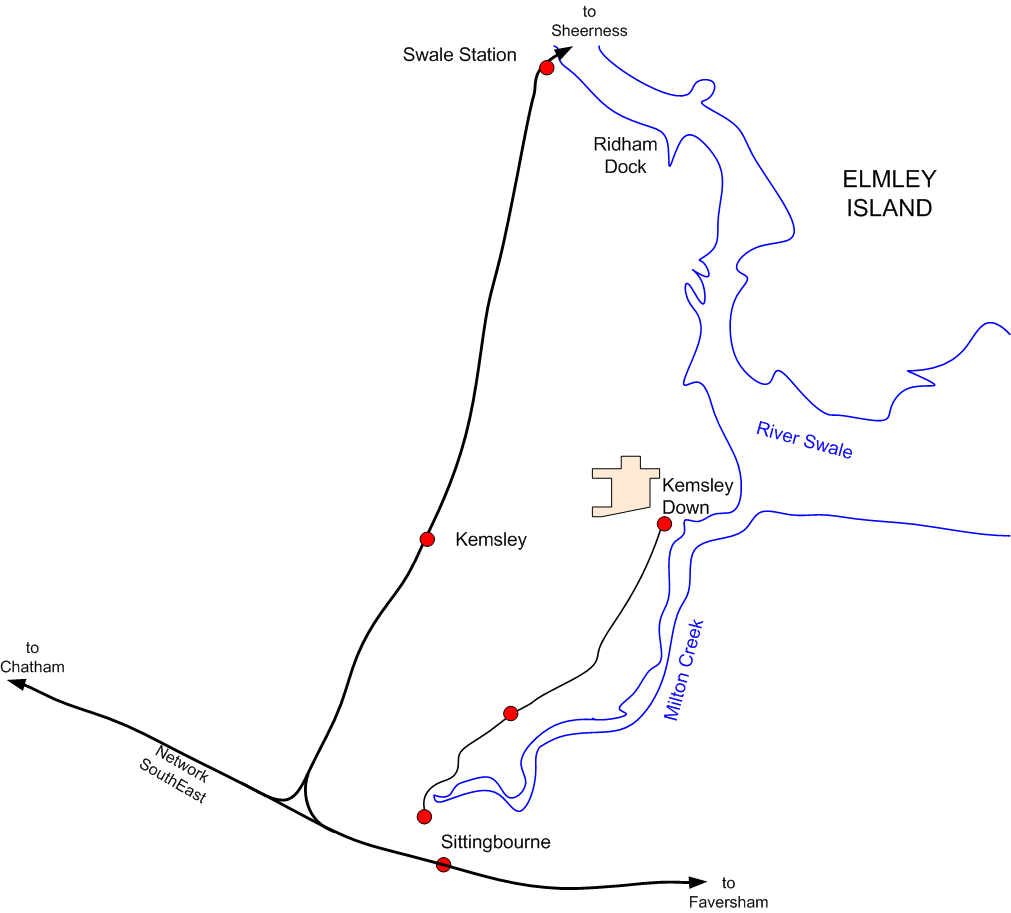
Map of the Swale Railway Station in relation to other local stations and the Sittingbourne & Kemsley Light Railway. The Chatham Main Line runs along the bottom, east to west, while the Sheerness Line branches off northwards, west of Sittingbourne.

Swale is a single platform station with one curving platform. It is immediately adjacent to the A249 road which is on a flyover above the station before it crosses The Swale on the Sheppey Crossing. The station is named after The Swale, the channel which separates the Isle of Sheppey from the mainland and connects with the River Medway to the west and Thames Estuary to the west. North of the station, the railway line crosses the channel on the Kingsferry Bridge. Ridham Dock lies 1 mile (1.6 km) south-east of the station.

Swale Station was, for many years, the least-used station in Kent, until, in the 2021/22 statistics, it was overtaken by Kemsing. However, in the 2023/24 statistics, it once again became the least used station.

== History ==
The station was opened in 1913 as a staff halt, called Kings Ferry Bridge Halt. On 17 December 1922, the Norwegian cargo ship Gyp collided with the Kingsferry Bridge, rendering it unfit for rail traffic, and the station was renamed Kings Ferry Bridge South Halt, and opened to the public, who were able to walk across the bridge to a temporary station at Kings Ferry Bridge North Halt to continue their journeys.

This arrangement continued until 1 November 1923, when the bridge reopened to traffic and the North halt closed. The station was renamed Kings Ferry Bridge Halt on this date. The name was changed to Swale Halt in 1929. With the building of the new Kingsferry Bridge in 1960, a new station was constructed by British Railways on a different alignment, opening on 20 April 1960.

In 2005 the idea of closing Swale station, or at least replacing its train service with a token service (e.g. one train a week in either direction), was proposed by the Strategic Rail Authority (SRA) but rejected.

== Services ==
All services at Swale are operated by Southeastern using Class 375 EMUs.

The typical off-peak service is one train per hour in each direction between Sheerness-on-Sea and Sittingbourne, from where connections are available to London Victoria, London St Pancras International, Dover Priory and Ramsgate.

Preceding station	National Rail	Following station
Kemsley	Southeastern Sheerness Line	Queenborough
