= Kings Ferry Bridge North Halt railway station =

Former railway station in England

Coordinates: 51°23′28″N 0°45′18″E

Kings Ferry Bridge North Halt

General information
- Location: Kingsferry Bridge, Swale; England
- Platforms: 1

Other information
- Status: Disused

History
- Pre-grouping: South Eastern & Chatham Railway

Key dates
- December 1922: Opened
- 1 November 1923: Closed
Location

Kings Ferry Bridge North Halt on the Isle of Sheppey in the English county of Kent, was a temporary railway station opened in December 1922 and closed on 1 November 1923.

== History ==
On 17 December 1922, the Norwegian cargo ship Gyp collided with the Kingsferry Bridge, rendering it unfit to carry rail traffic. This disrupted journeys between the Isle of Sheppey and the mainland.

On the mainland Kings Ferry Bridge staff halt was renamed Swale Halt and opened to the public. A temporary halt was built north of the bridge, named Kings Ferry Bridge North Halt. Passengers had to walk over the bridge in order to continue their journeys. The bridge was eventually repaired, and through rail services were restored on 1 November 1923, and this station closed on this date.

Preceding station	Disused railways	Following station
Swale Halt	SECR; Sheerness Line	Queenborough
Swale Halt	Southern Railway; Sheerness Line	Queenborough
