= Iwade, Kent =

Village in Kent, England

Coordinates: 51.376°N 0.728°E

Iwade
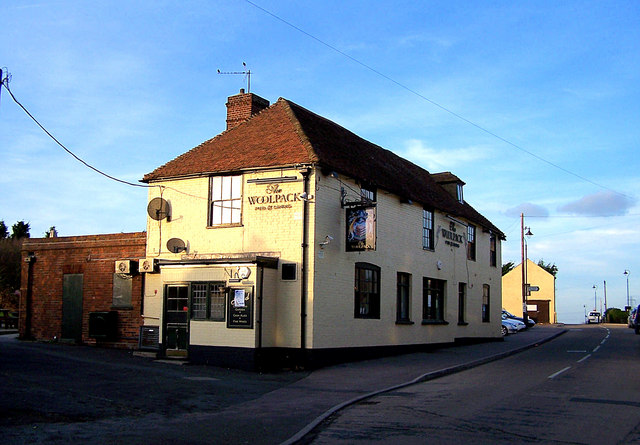
- The Woolpack Inn, Iwade

- Location within Kent
- Population: 3,087 (2011 Census)
- Civil parish: Iwade
- District: Swale
- Shire county: Kent
- Region: South East
- Country: England
- Sovereign state: United Kingdom
- Post town: SITTINGBOURNE
- Postcode district: ME9
- Dialling code: 01795
- UK Parliament: Sittingbourne and Sheppey

Iwade /ˈaɪˌweɪd/ is a village and civil parish 2 miles (3.2 km) north of the town of Sittingbourne, in the Swale district, in the English county of Kent. In 2011 the parish had a population of 3087.

== History ==
Iwade was established in the late Medieval period, when it was a settlement linking Watling Street to the coast via Key Street (a street towards a Quay). A moated dwelling is believed to have existed here during the 13th to 15th centuries. According to Edward Hasted, in 1798 the manor of Warde (Iwade) was within the hundred of Teynham. It had sixteen houses, and about 60 or 70 inhabitants.

The village lies on the former route of the A249 road, a major road from Maidstone to the Isle of Sheppey. A bypass was constructed in 1992, and improved again in 2006 during construction of the Sheppey Crossing. Iwade is the nearest settlement to Swale railway station.

In 2014, a prehistoric henge was discovered during the development of new homes. It is believed to date from around 6000BC and is 30 metres (98 ft) in diameter.

== Facilities ==
Iwade has a village hall and a public house (The Woolpack). The village church is dedicated to All Saints and was established around the 13th century. It was restored in 1874, with a south porch being added in 1893. The church has been a Grade I listed building since 1967. It is within the diocese of Canterbury, and deanery of Sittingbourne.

The Sittingbourne Speedway track is close to Iwade. It offers speedway training facilities for riders, and has been the base of the speedway team Sittingbourne Crusaders who raced in the Conference League. To the north of the village is a Grade II listed Heavy Anti-aircraft gunsite used in World War II. It is one of only nine such sites in the country still existing in its original state, and one of two in Kent.

== See also ==
- Listed buildings in Iwade
