= SWL =

SWL or swl may refer to:

- IATA code for San Vicente Airport in Palawan, Philippines
- Safe working load, of lifting equipment
- Shortwave listening, to radio
- Sound power level
- Socialist Workers League (Australia), former name of the Socialist Workers Party in Australia
- Stillwater - Westport Line, New Zealand railway
- Swale railway station, in Kent, England
- SWL, former name of the Tasmanian Football League
