= Blue Town =

Coordinates: 51°26.5′N 0°45′E

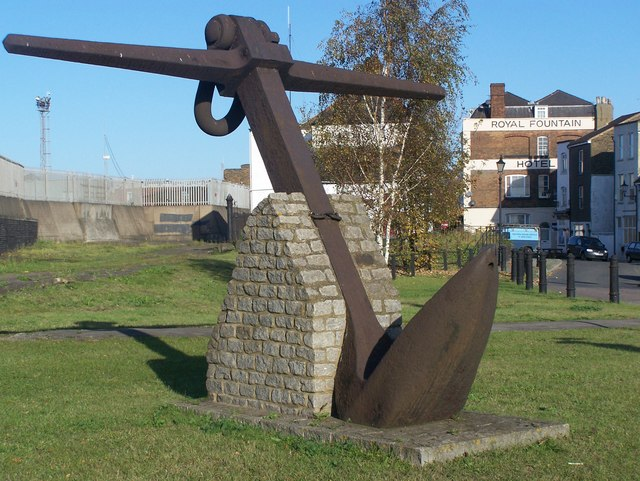
The Blue Town Anchor

Blue Town is a suburb of the town of Sheerness on the Isle of Sheppey in Kent. It sits on the A249 Brielle Way which runs from Queenborough to Sheerness. It sits just outside the dockyard wall which marks the boundary of Sheerness proper and today is largely industrial in nature.

== History ==
Blue Town grew up alongside the Naval Dock Yard during the Napoleonic Wars and gained its distinctive name from the practice of the earliest inhabitants to preserve their wooden houses using blue paint “liberated” from their employers in the dock yard. It began as a small self-contained community built on a very damp and wet place reclaimed out of the marshes. It was a very confined area, a dense triangle of houses and alleyways compressed between the dockyard wall and Well Marsh, and was prone to both flood and fire. At one point separated from Sheerness fort by a moat and drawbridge, the area was enclosed by an earthwork bastioned trace at the end of the 18th century amid growing fears of a French invasion.

A Jewish community lived in Sheerness, primarily in Blue Town, for about a century. It is thought they moved from nearby Chatham, in about 1790 and many worked as Navy Agents. The community shrank after the Napoleonic Wars ended and the synagogue was dismantled in 1887.
