= John Howard (civil engineer) =

British civil engineer (1901–1986)

- Born: John Alfred Golding Howard; 17 November 1901; Sydney, Australia
- Died: 2 January 1986 (aged 84); Kempston, Bedfordshire
- Occupation: Civil engineer

Sir John Alfred Golding Howard (17 November 1901 – 2 January 1986) was a British civil engineer, described by The Daily Telegraph as "one of the last great construction pioneers" who "will long be remembered in the industry as a visionary for whom no engineering challenge was too much".

== Biography ==
Born in Sydney, Australia, on 17 November 1901, John Howard was educated at Bedford School. In 1927 he founded John Howard and Co. Ltd., Civil Engineering Contractors. He remained chairman and managing director of the company until 1982, when he became president. His company was responsible for construction of the Severn Bridge, the Humber Bridge, the Forth Road Bridge, Kingsferry Bridge and the Channel Tunnel, and Howard was a great advocate for a third London airport to be constructed in the Thames Estuary.

Howard became active in Conservative Party politics and was appointed Chairman of the National Union of Conservative and Unionist Associations in 1962, presiding over the Conservative Party Conference at Llandudno in that year. In October 1984, he attended the Conservative Party Conference at Brighton, and was only two rooms away from Norman Tebbit when the Brighton hotel bombing occurred, emerging unscathed.

Sir John Howard was knighted in 1954, Chairman of the Harpur Trust between 1966 and 1978, and became Deputy Lieutenant of Bedfordshire in 1978. He died in Kempston, Bedfordshire, on 2 January 1986, at the age of 84.
