= The Swale =

Channel of the Thames Estuary in Kent, UK

Coordinates: 51.362°N 0.873°E

- Site of Special Scientific Interest
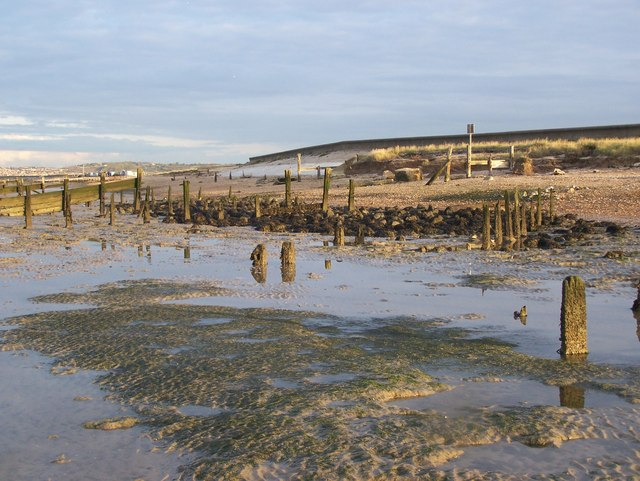
- Location of The Swale.
- Area of search: Kent
- Grid reference: TR 001 665
- Interest: Biological
- Area: 6,509.4 hectares (16,085 acres)
- Notification date: 1990
- Location map: Magic Map

Designations

Ramsar Wetland
- Official name: The Swale
- Designated: 17 July 1985
- Reference no.: 299

The Swale is a tidal channel of the Thames estuary that separates the Isle of Sheppey from the rest of Kent. On its banks is a 6,509.4-hectare (16,085-acre) biological Site of Special Scientific Interest which stretches from Sittingbourne to Whitstable in Kent. It is also a Ramsar internationally important wetland site and a Special Protection Area under the European Union Directive on the Conservation of Wild Birds. Parts of it are a Nature Conservation Review site, Grade I, National Nature Reserves, a Kent Wildlife Trust nature reserve and a Local Nature Reserve.

== History ==
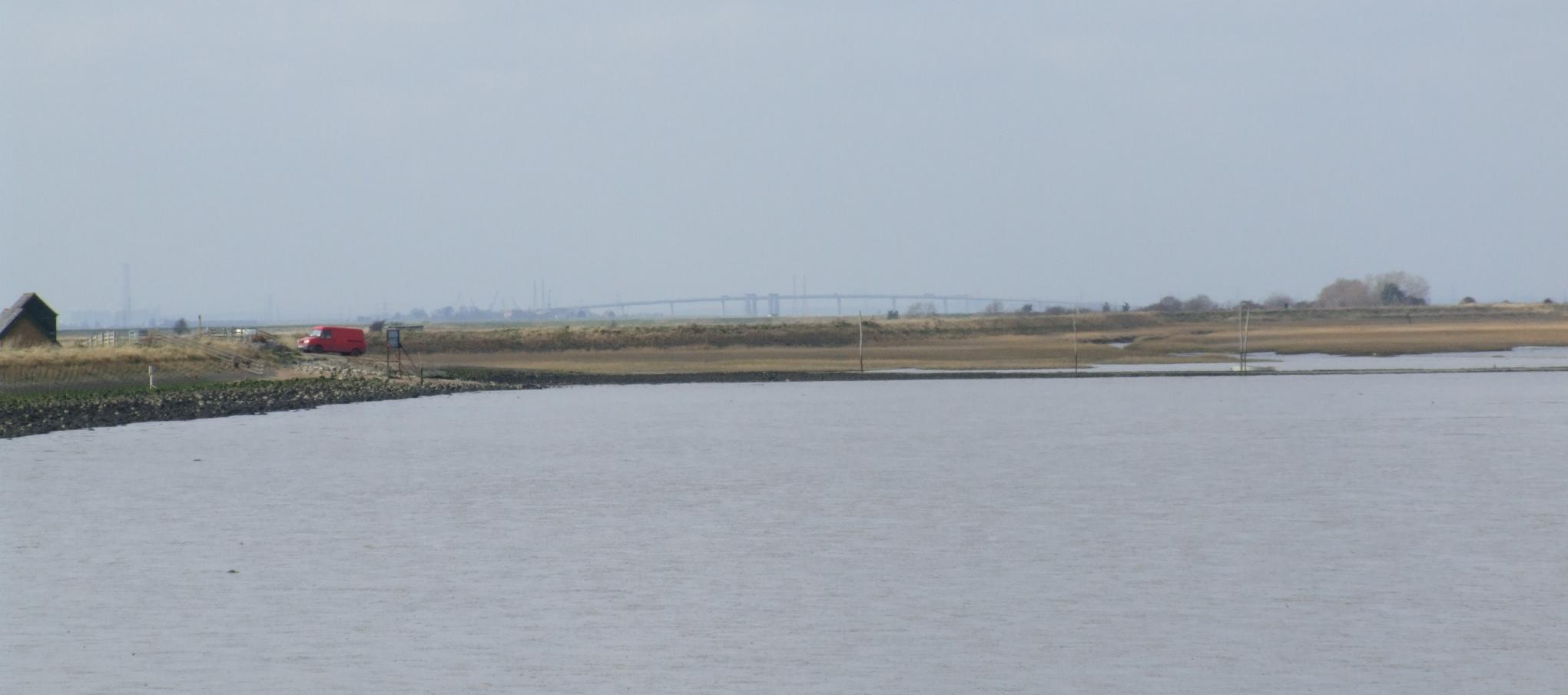
A distance shot of the two Swale crossings.

The name "Swale" is Old English in origin, and is believed to mean "swirling, rushing river", or "rushing water".

=== Peri-glacial period ===
At these times the Swale was a gully from what had been a sea channel in very warm periods. Namely before the Strait of Dover had swept away so much swampy land, accentuated by sea levels being lower, even to beyond the end of the ice age, i.e. in the mid seventh millennium BC, the coasts of Essex and Kent stretched much further into the North Sea. Sheppey formed part of mainland Britain. The Swale was a valley opening eastwards. As sea-levels rose again, water occupied its whole length. It and the very mouth of the Medway divide the Isle of Sheppey from the mainland.

=== Roman Warm Period ===
When the Romans arrived in Britain, the Swale was much wider, with one part of the Isle of Sheppey — now called the Isle of Harty or Harty — a separate island.

=== Former ferries ===
Two c. 1600 to 1900 public ferries crossed the Swale. One operated between Oare and Harty, and the other between Murston (near Sittingbourne) and Elmley (another former hamlet and essentially attached islet). Harty is no longer separate but the marshlands gradually encroaching delineate it.

== Dredging and channel traffic ==
The channel needs constant dredging for busy recreational and light vessel use.

== Bridges ==
The Swale is crossed at its western end by two bridges: the Kingsferry Bridge and the later Sheppey Crossing.

== Nature ==
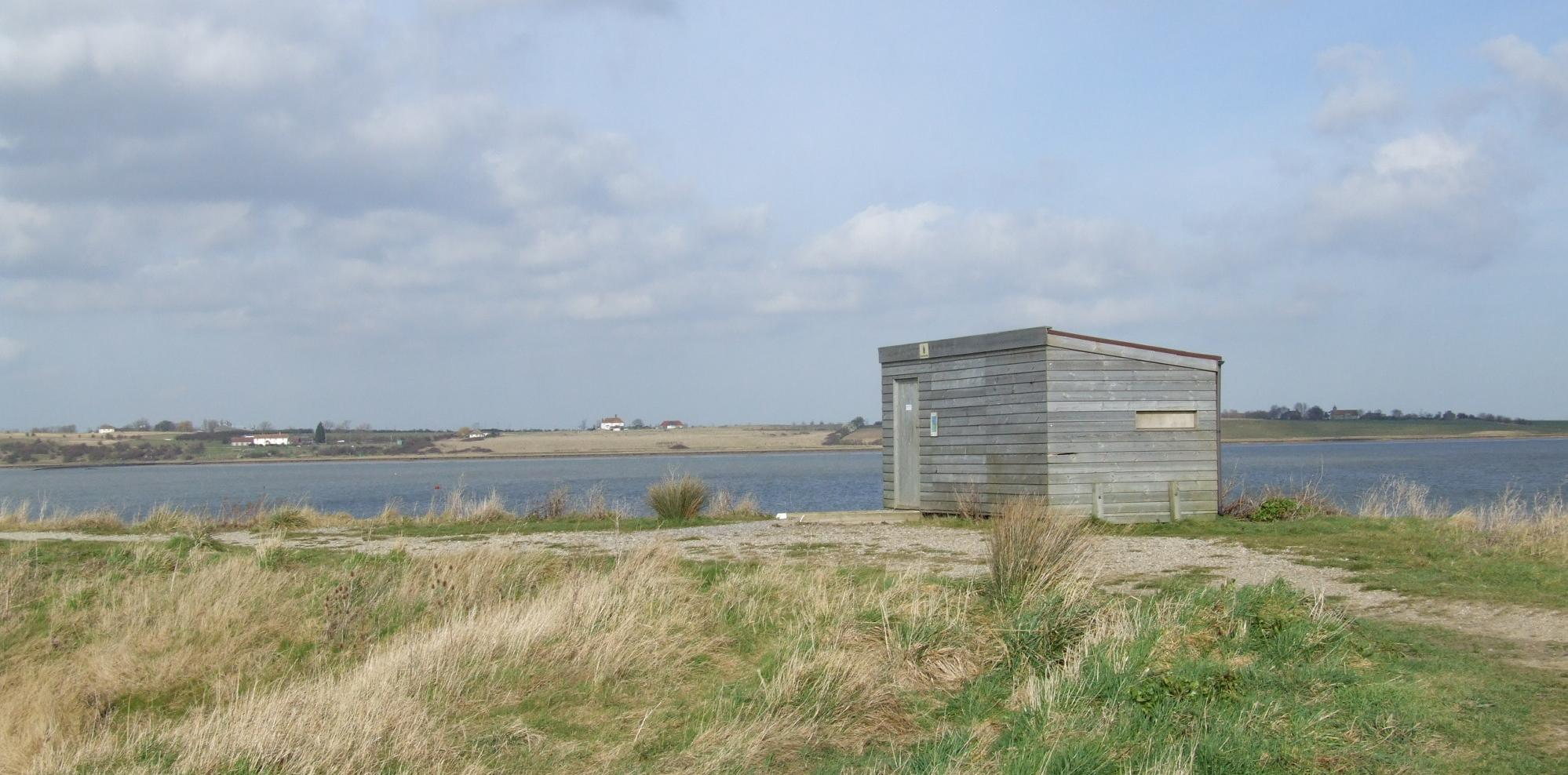
Birdwatching hide on the Kent Wildlife Trust reserve at Oare Marshes

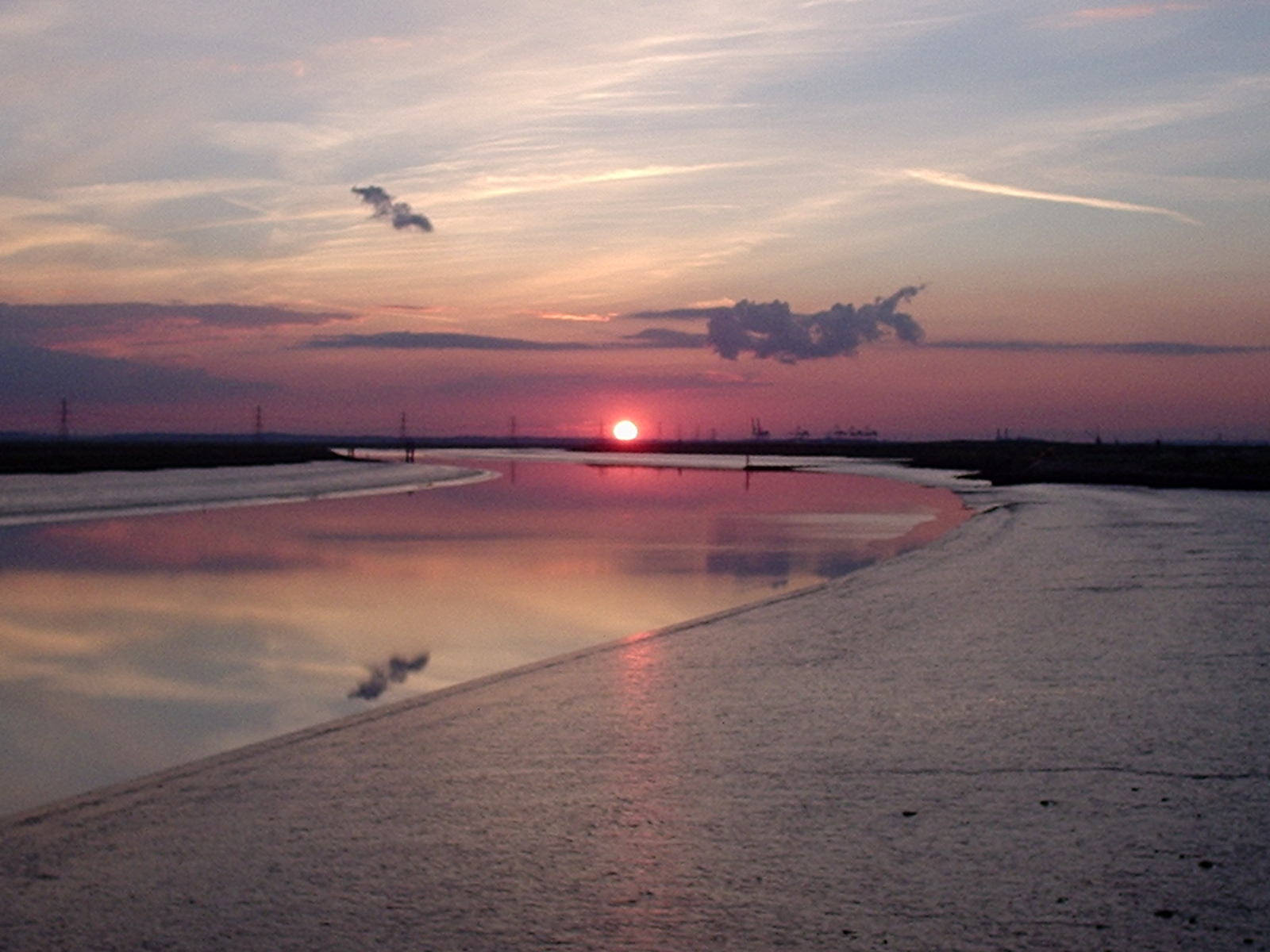
The northernmost position of a sunset over the Swale (approximately north-west as on the longest day of the year)

The Swale forms both a National Nature Reserve and a Special Protection Area: the eel grass, Ray's knotgrass, white seakale, glassworts and golden samphire support rare and uncommon migrant butterflies and moths, including the Essex emerald, the ground lackey, the clouded yellow butterfly and rare hawk-moths. Since 1968, it has also been a Site of Special Scientific Interest.

=== Birds ===
The Swale provides habitats for the following birds:

- Pied avocet at least 17 percent of Great Britain's breeding population
- Marsh harrier at least 15 percent of Great Britain's breeding population
- Mediterranean gull
- Bar-tailed godwit
- Eurasian golden plover
- Hen harrier
- Ringed plover
- Black-tailed godwit
- Grey plover
- Knot
- Pintail
- Common redshank
- Northern shoveler

== See also ==
- Swale (local government district)
