= Sheerness line =

Railway line in Kent, England

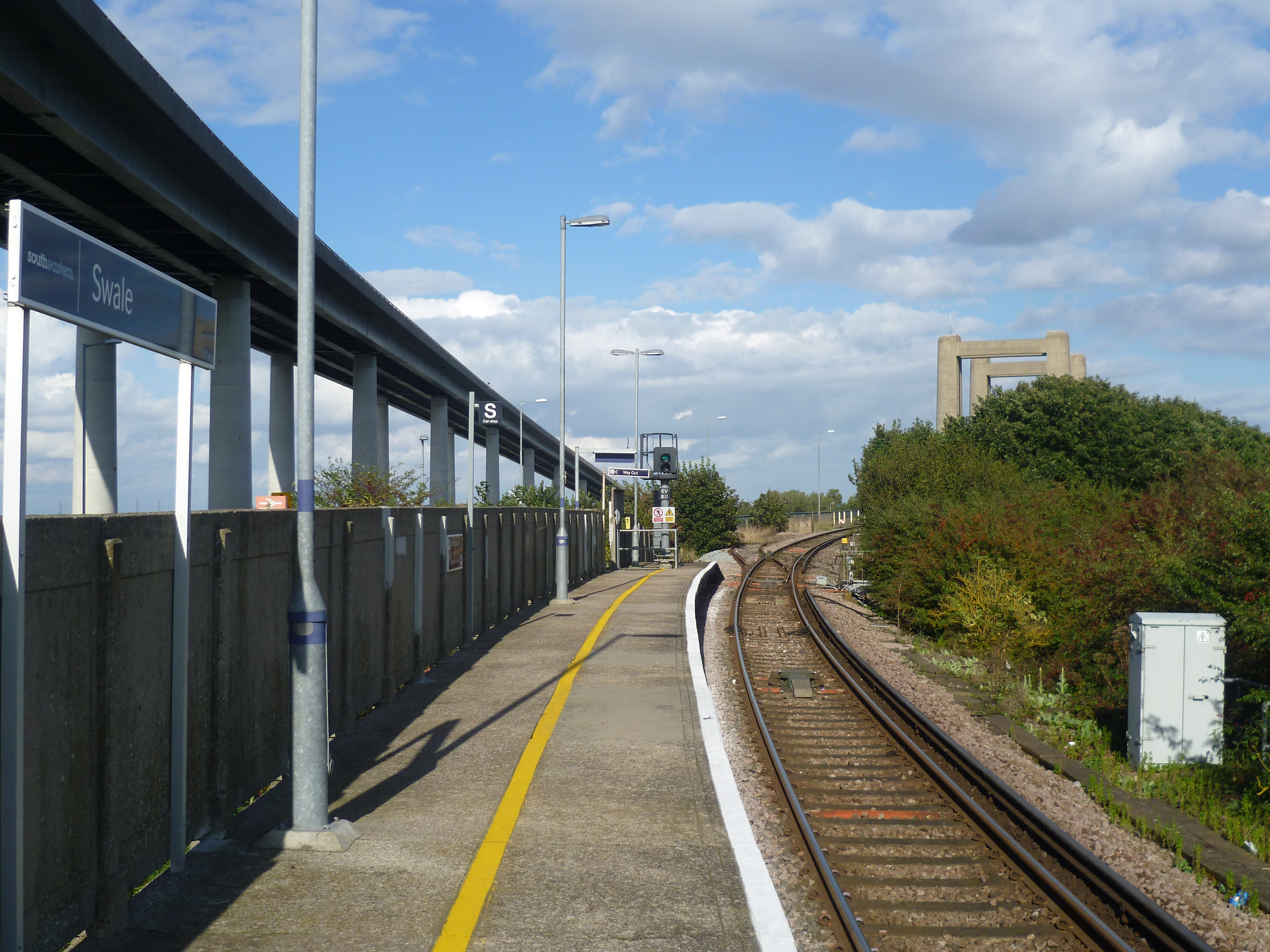
- Swale station, with the Sheppey Crossing (l) and Kingsferry Bridge (r)

Overview
- Status: Operational
- Owner: Network Rail
- Locale: Kent; South East England
- Termini: Sheerness-on-Sea; Sittingbourne

Service
- Type: Suburban rail, Heavy rail
- System: National Rail
- Operator: Southeastern
- Rolling stock: Class 375

Technical
- Line length: 7 mi 52 ch (12.3 km)
- Track gauge: 1,435 mm (4 ft 8 1/2 in) standard gauge
- Operating speed: 75 mph (121 km/h)
Route map
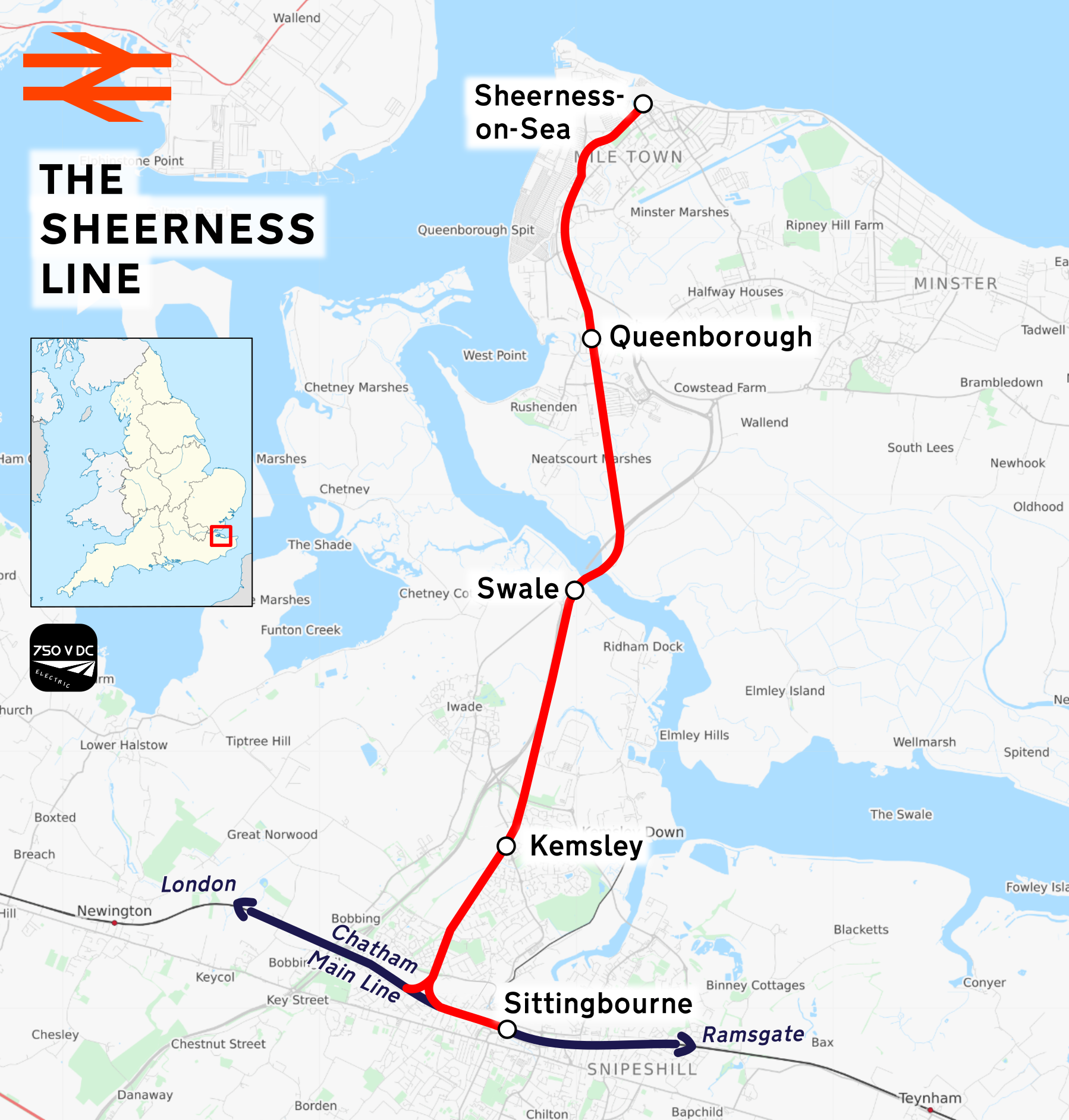
(Click to expand)

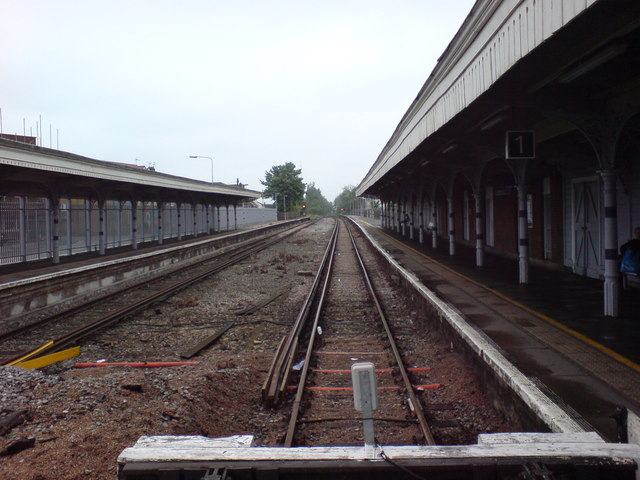
Sheerness-on-Sea railway station

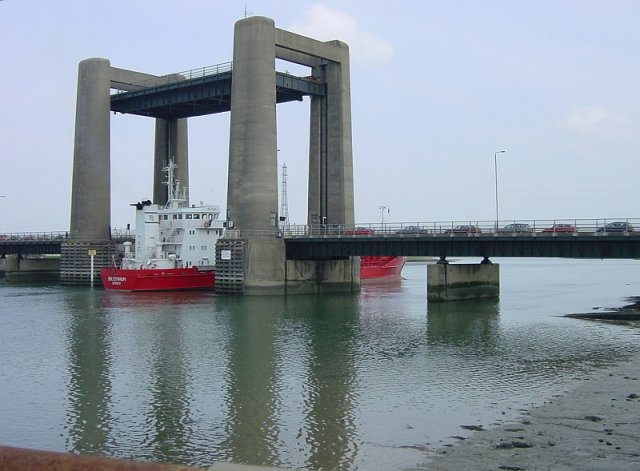
The Kingsferry Bridge

The Sheerness line is located in Kent, England, and connects Sheerness-on-Sea on the Isle of Sheppey with Sittingbourne on the mainland, and with the Chatham Main Line for trains towards London, Ramsgate or Dover Priory. It opened on 19 July 1860.

== History ==
Sittingbourne and Sheerness Railway Act 1856
- Act of Parliament
- Parliament of the United Kingdom
- Long title: An Act for making a Railway from Sittingbourne to Sheerness, all in the County of Kent; and for other Purposes.
- Citation: 19 & 20 Vict. c. lxxv

Dates
- Royal assent: 7 July 1856

Text of statute as originally enacted

The Sittingbourne and Sheerness Railway was authorised by the Sittingbourne and Sheerness Railway Act 1856 (19 & 20 Vict. c. lxxv) Sheerness branch line opened on 19 July 1860, from Sittingbourne to, at first, a station in the Blue Town area of Sheerness, close to the southern edge of the Royal Navy dockyard. In 1883 a further station was added at Sheerness-on-Sea, accessed by a reversing curve from the original station, which was renamed Sheerness Dockyard. At this time, all trains had to run first to the Dockyard station, then reverse (after the engine had changed ends) to Sheerness-on-Sea, and vice versa for the return journey. The original line was built by the independent Sittingbourne and Sheerness Railway Company, and taken over by the London, Chatham and Dover Railway (LC&DR) under the London, Chatham and Dover Railway (Various Powers) Act 1866 (29 & 30 Vict. c. cclxxxiii). After 1899, it was run by the South Eastern and Chatham Railway, formed by the working union of the LC&DR with the South Eastern Railway.

In 1902 the so-called Navy Tram Road was constructed from the Dockyard station into HM Dockyard for the transfer of good wagons. In 1922 a direct line to Sheerness-on-Sea station was built, bypassing the older station, from which date all passenger trains ran to the newer station, and the Dockyard station was used only by goods trains.

Sheerness-on-Sea station remains open, but the Dockyard station was closed to all traffic in about 1968. Its site is now occupied by sidings serving Sheerness Steel, but the former Navy Tram Road still exists. The Royal Navy dockyard closed in 1961, but the rail link was kept in the belief it would continue to serve the new commercial docks on the former Navy site.

The line was electrified by British Railways on 15 June 1959 as part of the "Kent Coast electrification" in the 1955 Modernisation Plan.

== Accidents and incidents ==
- On 29 June 1892 a train from Sheerness-on-Sea collided with the buffer stops at Sheerness Dockyard station, injuring nine passengers and the driver. The Westinghouse brake connection between the engine (no. 81, an 0-4-2WT of the LCDR Scotchmen class) and train was closed off due to the negligence of the driver and fireman, and was not checked by the guard. All three men were penalised.
- On 17 December 1922, the Norwegian cargo ship Gyp collided with the Kingsferry Bridge, rendering it unfit to carry rail traffic. The bridge was eventually repaired, and through rail services were restored on 1 November 1923.
- On 26 February 1971, a train formed of five 2HAP electric multiple units overran the buffers and demolished the station building at Sheerness-on-Sea. One person was killed and ten were injured.

== Train services ==
Train services on the line are operated by Southeastern. Since December 2019, three-car Class 375/3 Electrostars have operated on the line, replacing two-car Class 466 units.

== Sheppey Light Railway ==
The Sheppey Light Railway was a branch line from Queenborough to Leysdown, opened in 1901 and closed 1950.
