= Jade's Crossing =

Footbridge in Kent, England

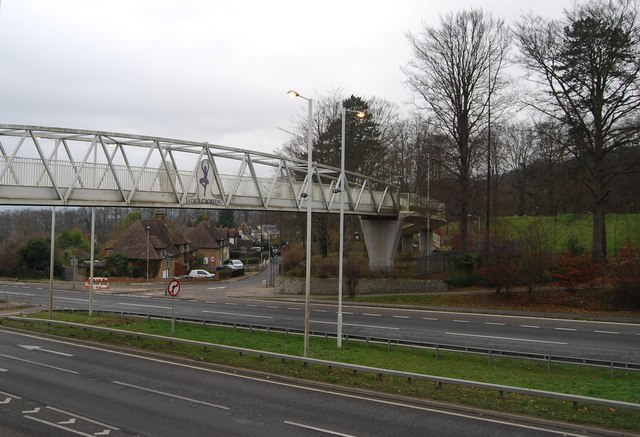
- Looking towards the crossing, the A249 and the Pilgrim's Way
- Coordinates: 51.297328°N 0.573305°E
- Carries: Pedestrians
- Crosses: A249
- Owner: Kent County Council

History
- Successful competition design: Pride of Britain Award Winners 2003
- Construction start: March 2001
- Opened: August 2002

Location
- Interactive map of Jade's Crossing

Jade's Crossing is a footbridge in Detling, Kent, England. The footbridge crosses the A249, a major road which runs between Maidstone and Sheerness. The crossing is named after Jade Hobbs, who was killed attempting to cross the road in December 2000 aged eight. Her mother, Caroline, subsequently campaigned for the crossing to be built, and won a Special Award at the 2003 Pride of Britain Awards for her efforts.

== Background ==
The A249 is a major dual carriageway, connecting the M20 and M2 motorways in Kent. It was improved in the 1960s to be an important link between these two roads, with the expectation that traffic would increase greatly along it.

The location of the crossing lies on the Pilgrim's Way, a historic track from Winchester to Canterbury, to the west of Detling village itself. The road junction was built in 1961 as part of the Detling Bypass, which took the A249 away from the village centre. It opened to traffic in the summer of 1962. By 2000, an estimated 30,000 vehicles were using the road daily.

== Jade Hobbs ==
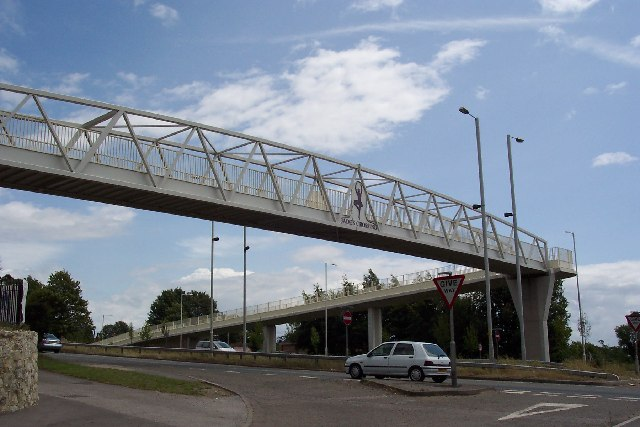
View of the crossing from one side of the footbridge

In 2000, Jade Hobbs was eight years old, and lived with her parents Paul and Caroline and four siblings. They had been complaining about the traffic for some time, and had led a campaign to persuade Kent County Council to install a footbridge.

On 16 December, Jade was walking with her grandmother, Margaret Kuwertz, to do some Christmas shopping. Kuwertz had looked across the road, and decided it was safe, but just before they managed to cross the other side, she was hit by an oncoming vehicle. Jade attempted to pull her grandmother to safety, but was also killed by the impact. Caroline Hobbs later recalled "Mum must've thought they could get across, and hadn't seen the other car. And they were actually nearly across when the car hit them."

== Crossing ==
The crossing includes the silhouette of a ballerina.

After the accident, Caroline Hobbs insisted that not only did the crossing impact safety, it also affected quality of life as it prevented children from being able to walk to the local school or village hall unaccompanied. Kent County Council installed two speed cameras at the junction in 2001 but refused to build a footbridge on cost grounds.

The Hobbs family set up a charity for donations, raising £75,000 towards constructing the footbridge. In March 2001, the council announced that the crossing would be built. It was officially opened by Caroline and Paul Hobbs in August 2002. The crossing includes a ballerina silhouette, based on one of Jade's favourite hobbies. A plaque near the crossing commemorates Jade and other fatal casualties at accidents on the A249. The Hobbs' campaigning towards building the crossing resulted in Caroline winning the Special Award at the 2003 Pride of Britain Awards.

Caroline Hobbs continued to run the Jade Charity. In 2007, it donated road safety play equipment to local schools. The charity relies on the goodwill of visitors, principally walkers travelling along the Pilgrim's Way, to leave a donation to help fund the upkeep of the crossing. In 2010 the Hobbs family left the area and moved abroad.

In February 2011, the crossing was defaced with anti-Muslim graffiti.
