= Listed buildings in Iwade, Kent =

Historic structures in Kent, England

Iwade is a village and civil parish in the Swale District of Kent, England. It contains five listed buildings that are recorded in the National Heritage List for England. Of these one is grade I and four are grade II.

This list is based on the information retrieved online from Historic England.

== Key ==
Grade	Criteria
I	Buildings that are of exceptional interest
II*	Particularly important buildings of more than special interest
II	Buildings that are of special interest

== Listing ==
Name	Grade	Location	Type	Completed (Note: The date given is the date used by Historic England as significant for the initial building or that of an important part in the structure's description.)	Date designated	Grid ref. (Note: The grid reference is based on the British national grid reference system, sometimes known as OSGB36, used by the Ordnance Survey.) Geo-coordinates	Notes	Entry number (Note: The "List Entry Number" is a unique number assigned to each listed building and scheduled monument by Historic England.)	Image	Wikidata
Coleshall Farmhouse	II	Ferry Road			13 February 1974	TQ8972967148; 51°22′18″N 0°43′28″E		1116241	Upload Photo	Q26409881
Culnells	II	School Lane			24 January 1967	TQ8897666923; 51°22′12″N 0°42′49″E		1069379	Upload Photo	Q26322333
Church of All Saints	I	The Street	church building		24 January 1967	TQ9013267949; 51°22′43″N 0°43′50″E		1069380	Church of All Saints More images	Q17530061
Ivy Cottage	II	2, The Street			24 January 1967	TQ9009867907; 51°22′42″N 0°43′49″E		1116219	Upload Photo	Q26409860
Traditional Agricultural Barn	II	The Street			26 September 2003	TQ9010567989; 51°22′45″N 0°43′49″E		1390604	Upload Photo	Q26669992

== See also ==
- Grade I listed buildings in Kent
- Grade II* listed buildings in Kent

== Sources ==
- Newman, John (2013) [1969], Kent: North-East and East, The Buildings of England, New Haven and London: Yale University Press, ISBN 978-0-300-18506-5
