= Elmley =

Coordinates: 51.3909°N 0.7756°E

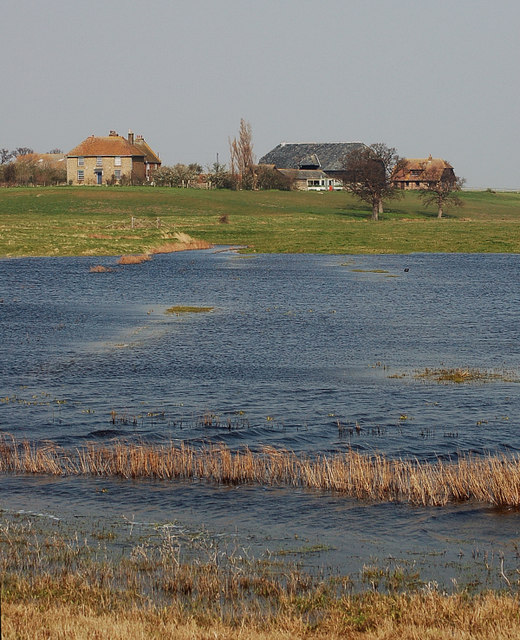
- Kings Hill Farm buildings and the Elmley Marshes

- Location within Kent
- Civil parish: Minster-on-Sea
- District: Swale
- Shire county: Kent
- Region: South East
- Country: England
- Sovereign state: United Kingdom
- Police: Kent
- Fire: Kent
- Ambulance: South East Coast
- UK Parliament: Sittingbourne and Sheppey

Elmley is the local name for the Isle of Elmley, in the civil parish of Minster-on-Sea, part of the Isle of Sheppey in the Swale district, in the county of Kent, England. It was also the name of a very late 19th century industrial village on the isle. Edward Hasted describes, in 1798, the isle as two-eighths of the Isle of Sheppey (in turn) estimated as 11 miles by 8 miles. Its present national nature reserve covers more than the easily traceable area of the former isle by extending to the east, over Windmill Creek, one of two Sheppey inlets, former internal tidal channels.

== History ==
The village was a settlement and area that fluctuated between 1640 and up to 2341 acres by definition. The former civil parish at its height as recorded by decennial censuses had 219 residents at the 1891 census, falling to 50 in twenty years and to 8 in 1961. On 1 April 1968 the parish was abolished to form Queenborough in Sheppey. It consisted of the Turkey Cement Works, which was the major employer for the area, as well as a school, a church, a public house and 30 dwellings. The ailing cement works closed in 1902 and then the population dwindled. Elmley School closed in the 1920s and the church was demolished in the 1960s leaving memorials of graves.

There was also once a ferry service crossing the Swale to Murston (near Sittingbourne).

The last surviving buildings of the village are the Grade II listed 'Kingshill Farmhouse' and 'Kingshill Farmhouse Barn'

== Elmley today ==
In the 1970s a bird reserve was established on the marshes, the centrepiece of the Elmley National Nature Reserve, owned and managed by Elmley Conservation Trust. It covers 3,250 acres (13.2 km^{2}), more than the easily traceable area of the former isle and is one of the largest bird reserves in England.
