= Sheppey Crossing =

Bridge in Kent, England

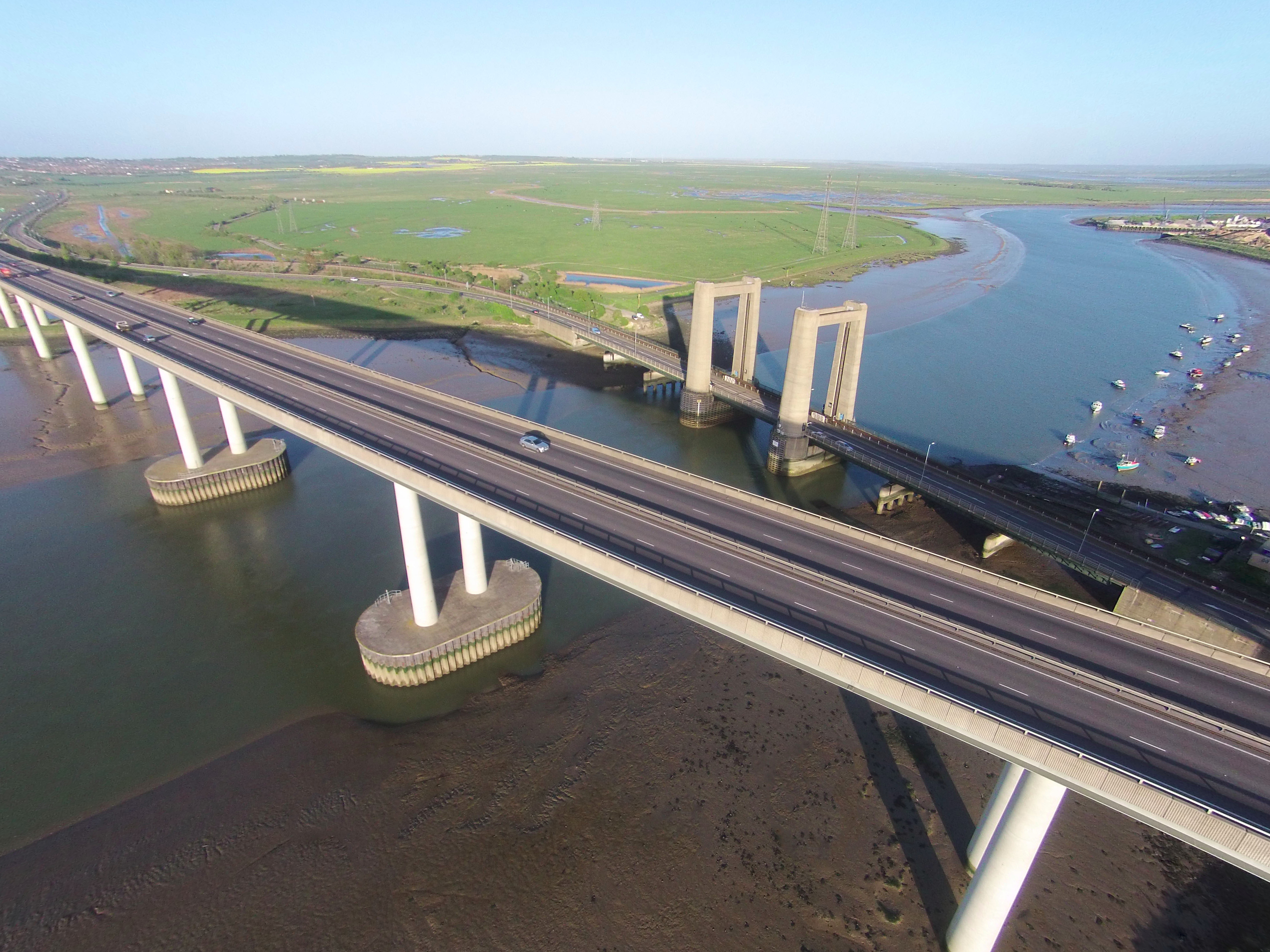
- Aerial view of the Sheppey Crossing, with the older Kingsferry Bridge behind
- Coordinates: 51°23′26.20″N 00°44′49.76″E
- Carries: Four lane dual carriageway highway
- Crosses: The Swale (a strait in the North Sea)
- Locale: Isle of Sheppey, Kent, England

Characteristics
- Design: beam bridge
- Total length: 1.3km
- Width: 21 metres (70 feet)
- Longest span: 92.5m
- Clearance above: 35 metres (115 feet)

History
- Construction cost: £30 million
- Opened: 3 July 2006; 19 years ago

Location
- Interactive map of Sheppey Crossing

The Sheppey Crossing is a bridge which carries the A249 road across the Swale (a tidal strait of the Thames Estuary), linking the Isle of Sheppey with the mainland of Kent. The four-lane crossing measures 21.5 m (71 feet) in width, at a height of 35 m (115 feet) over the water. The A249 links the M20 and M2 motorways to Sheppey. The bridge opened in 2006, and it provides an alternative highway to the neighbouring Kingsferry Bridge that was completed in 1959.

The Sheppey Crossing is not open to pedestrians, bicycles, or horses, and these continue to use the older bridge, as does the railway line to Sheerness. Both bridges are monitored by an automatic number plate recognition (ANPR) system to detect lawbreaking vehicles.

== Construction ==
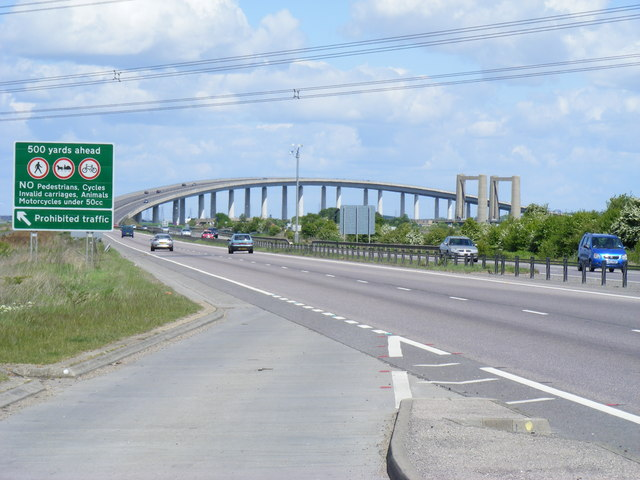
The A249 approaching the Sheppey Crossing from the south

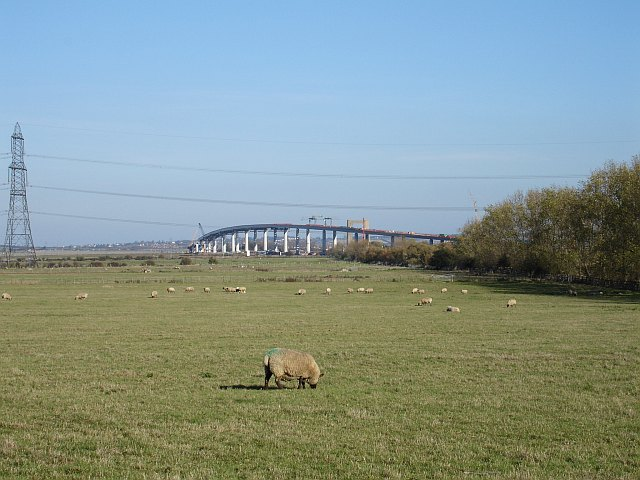
Distant view of the Sheppey Crossing

The bridge was constructed as part of a £100 million plan to improve the A249 between the M2 and the port of Sheerness. The Kingsferry Bridge, which previously carried the A249, suffers from two major drawbacks:

- It has only one lane in each direction, and as traffic to and from the island increased over time it became a bottleneck.
- It is a vertical-lift bridge. It often needs to be raised to allow marine traffic to pass under it, leading to lengthy traffic delays.

Before its opening, it was estimated that 26,000 vehicles a day would use the new crossing.

A tunnel, as an alternative crossing, was advocated by the Council for the Protection of Rural England and others, on landscape and safety grounds. This was rejected primarily on environmental grounds, the site being within and near Special Protection Areas.

The bridge was designed by Cass Hayward and Capita Symonds, and won the 2007 IStructE Award for Transportation Structures. Around 10,000 tonnes of steel was used in construction, which was carried out by Carillion under a private finance initiative contract. Construction was difficult because many of the bridge's piers had to be built on marshland. A jacking mechanism was employed to move the sections of roadway into position from each end of the bridge, with the final two sections of deck lifted into place during November 2005.

The bridge was opened on 3 July 2006, by the Minister of Transport, Stephen Ladyman. A competition held to name the new bridge was won by lifelong Sheppey resident Reginald Grimwade, who was then invited to attend the opening ceremony and presented with an award by Ladyman.

== Incidents ==
On the morning of 5 September 2013, more than 130 vehicles were involved in a series of shunt crashes on the southbound carriageway of the crossing, which at the time was covered in heavy fog. Emergency services were called to the crossing at around 07:15 BST according to Kent Police, and the bridge was subsequently closed for nine hours. Inappropriate driving in conditions of very poor visibility was suggested as the cause. There were eight serious injuries and 60 minor injuries, but no life-threatening injuries or deaths.

Following the incident, questions were raised over the safety of the unlit bridge, with calls for speed restrictions and overhead lights. The AA suggested matrix warning signs "as a minimum".

The crossing was closed both ways on 1 July 2014 following the first fatal accident. A mother and her 8-year-old son died. Her 7-year-old son survived, but was airlifted to King's College Hospital, London.

The crossing was closed on 9 February 2020 over safety concerns during Storm Ciara.
