= Kingsferry Bridge =

Road-rail bridge in Kent, England

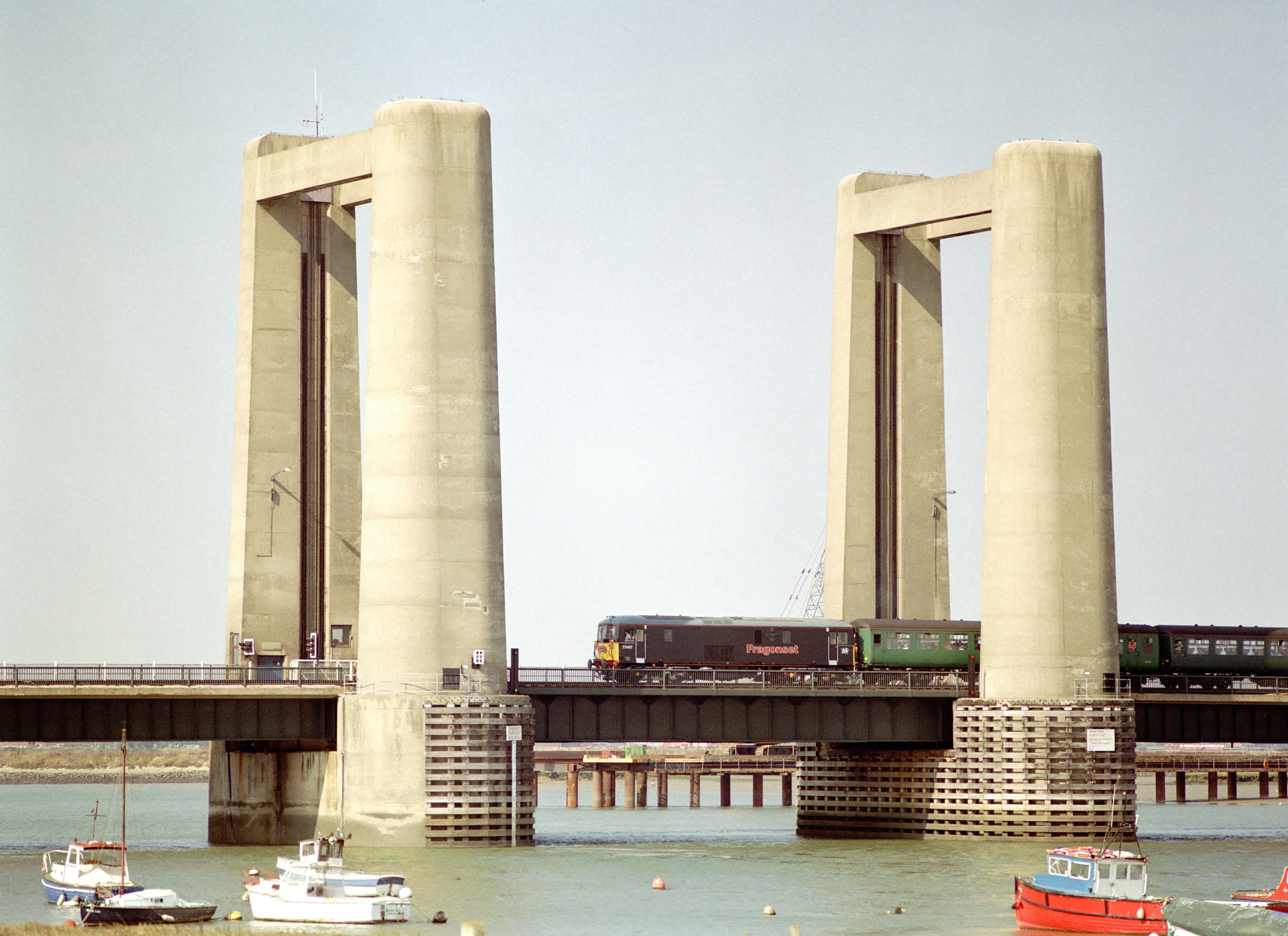
- Charter train on Kingsferry Bridge
- Coordinates: 51°23′27″N 0°45′01″E
- Carries: 2 lane road single track railway pedestrians
- Crosses: The Swale
- Locale: Isle of Sheppey, Kent, England

Characteristics
- Design: Vertical lift bridge
- Width: 50 feet (15 m)
- Longest span: 123 feet (37 m)
- Clearance above: 120 feet (37 m)

History
- Opened: 20 April 1960

Location
- Interactive map of Kingsferry Bridge

The Kingsferry Bridge is a combined road and railway vertical-lift bridge which connects the Isle of Sheppey to mainland Kent in South East England. The seven-span bridge has a central lifting span which allows ships to pass.

Opened in 1860, the first bridge on this site was constructed for the London, Chatham & Dover Railway Company on their line between Kent and the port of Sheerness. Originally a bascule bridge, it opened to allow large vessels to navigate past and not obstruct maritime traffic on the Swale. On 17 December 1922, the Norwegian cargo ship Gyp collided with the bridge; it was repaired and returned to service after 10 months. The bascule bridge was closed in the 1950s and was replaced by the present Kingsferry Bridge. The new bridge was designed by Mott, Hay and Anderson, and constructed by John Howard, in conjunction with Dorman Long and Sir William Arrol & Co.

Swale railway station is at the southern end of the bridge. When opened, the structure carried the A249; up to 30,000 vehicles per day used the bridge. Most vehicular traffic has been diverted onto the Sheppey Crossing, which opened in 2006. The number of road vehicles crossing Kingsferry Bridge has dropped but it is still maintained as a key roadway between the island and the mainland, particularly for non-vehicular traffic and pedestrians.

== History ==
=== Background ===
In 1860, the first bridge on the site was completed. It was a bascule bridge, built to carry railway traffic across The Swale between the Isle of Sheppey and mainland Kent for the London, Chatham and Dover Railway to the port of Sheerness. There was also provision for road traffic over a single lane, controlled by traffic lights. The LCDR and the South Eastern Railway (SER) amalgamated to form the South Eastern and Chatham Railway which replaced major elements of the bridge and during 1904, a replacement Scherzer-type moving section was installed.

On 17 December 1922, the Norwegian cargo ship Gyp collided with the bridge causing extensive damage and a lengthy closure. Repairs took ten months before it was re-opened to traffic. It remained in use until 1960 when it was replaced by the present bridge and demolished.

=== Current bridge ===
During the late 1940s, it was recognised that a new bridge was required, because the existing bridge did not meet the increasing traffic demands of people wanting to use road vehicles. The design for the replacement bridge incorporated a two-lane roadway and a pedestrian footpath alongside the railway track. The new bridge's elevation was dictated by the low-lying river banks and the railway limited its maximum possible gradient.

In December 1957, construction commenced. The resident engineer was R. Hodges and the civil engineering company John Howard & Co was appointed the principal contractor; the steelwork was sourced from Dorman Long and the machinery was provided Sir William Arrol & Co. On 20 April 1960, it was officially opened by the Duchess of Kent.

For many decades, Kingsferry Bridge was the only crossing to Sheppey. Before the opening of the Sheppey Crossing in 2006, up to 30,000 vehicles per day crossed the bridge. Road traffic was inconvenienced when the bridge was opened to enable the boats to pass, usually at high tide. Each closure lasts for 15 to 20 minutes.

Kingsferry Bridge has been raised over 100,000 times during its lifetime; each lift has to be recorded. During January 2015, a bid by Iwade Parish Council to have the bridge recognised as a listed structure was turned down by English Heritage as it did not fall into the categories used to determine those sites that are most in need of protection.

During 2010, the Kent Police borrowed £73,000 from Swale Borough Council for an automatic number plate recognition system (ANPR). The system was installed on the Sheppey Crossing and Kingsferry Bridge that year in a bid to track criminals' movements.

== Mechanics and structure ==
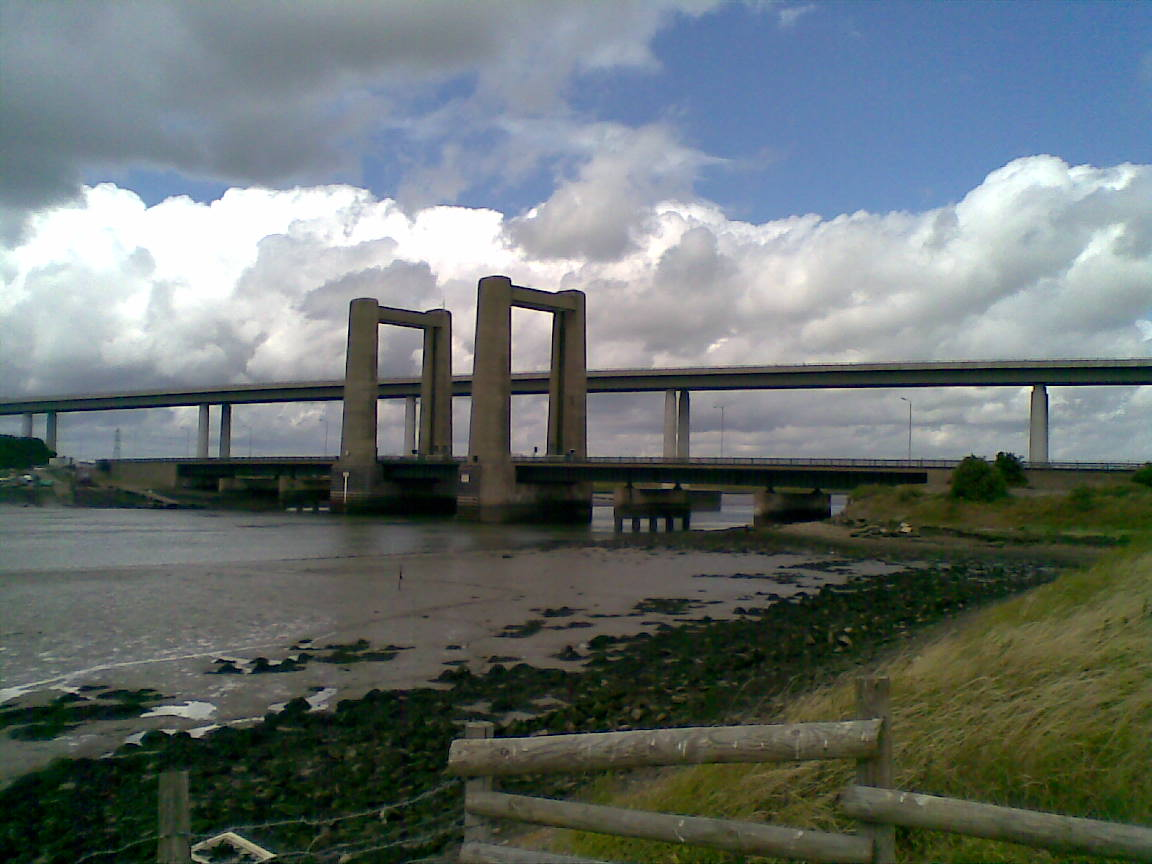
Kingsferry Bridge, with the Sheppey Crossing behind

The bridge is a combined road and railway vertical-lift bridge. It carries a 24-foot (7.3m) wide two-lane road, a 6-foot (1.8m) wide footpath and a single-track electrified railway line. Although the railway operates by electrified third rail, there is no electrification over the moving section of the bridge. To cross the bridge, electric trains coast across the gap in the electrification.

Structurally, the bridge comprises two sets of approach spans, each of which has three spans, either side of the central main lifting span. Each span comprises two riveted longitudinal steel deck girders, supporting riveted cross girders, which in turn support a reinforced concrete slab deck. Each set of three spans consists of two simply supported end spans which continue as cantilevers approximately 1/5 span into the middle span. The central 3/5 span sections are simply supported drop in spans supported by halving joints. The main span is a structurally independent lifting span. The bearings are inset from the end lifting beams. Spans 1, 3, 5 and 7 are 82 feet (25 m) c/c of bearings. Spans 2 and 6 are 86 feet (26 m), with halving joints 17.5 feet (5.3 m) from both end and a suspended span of 51 feet (16 m). The central lifting span, Span 4, is 102.5 feet (31.2 m) c/c of bearings, with cantilevers of 10.25 feet (3.12 m) either end to the lifting cross girders. The approach spans have cross girders, spaced 8 feet (2.4 m) apart, while the lifting girder features cross girders spaced at intervals of 20.5 feet (6.2 m).

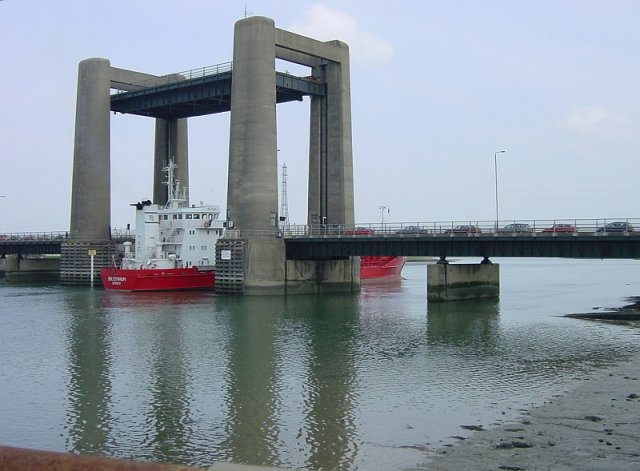
The bridge is raised up to 20 times per day to allow ships to pass underneath

The bridge abutments are of cellular concrete construction. Pier 1, 2, 5 and 6 comprise five reinforced concrete circular caisson piles, formed as piers. They have a diameter of 4.5 feet (1.4 m) and are spaced at intervals of 18 feet (5.5 m) between centres. A reinforced concrete cap, which has a height of 15 feet (4.6 m) and a depth of 6 feet, sits above the piers. Below the level of river bed is a cast iron subway, which links piers 3 and 4 of the bridge’s lifting span.

Piers 3 and 4 support the lifting span in addition to the approach spans. They are constructed of a pair of circular reinforced concrete caissons founded in the river bed. The caissons are linked by a concrete structure, positioned at approximately low tide level, which accommodates the machinery room and bearings for the lifting span. Two concrete towers extend above road level; both the towers and their piers are hollow as to allow them to support the lifting cables and counterweights. The towers are braced near the top by two concrete beams.

The moving section of the bridge is actuated via a pair of large electric motors located beneath the deck of the roadway. At either side are engine rooms containing equipment for operating the wire ropes and counterweights that lift and lower the bridge. Three storage areas and the bridge control room are located in the bases of the towers. The bridge can only be lifted when the Sittingbourne railway signalman has given authorisation to proceed when a train has passed out of the relevant track section. The maximum bridge lifting height is 84 feet; on attaining its full lift height, a klaxon is sounded to give auditory confirmation. To ensure that the lifting span has been correctly set back into place, it is equipped with locating devices to precisely align the tracks. To prevent operations being disrupted by a supply-related power failure, a standby diesel generator, capable of generating up to 40 kW, is located on site.

== In popular culture ==
The bridge and locations nearby were used in the BBC TV series ‘Silent Witness’, season 26, episodes 7 & 8 ‘Southbay pt1 & pt2’, although the episodes were set on the fictional island of Southbay on the Essex coast.

The bridge was used as a key location for the 2021 miniseries Too Close.

The bridge is referenced in the book, “The Bone Clocks: A Novel”, by David Mitchell

The bridge was used as a key location in Jason Statham’s ‘The Beekeeper’ (2024).

== See also ==
- List of road-rail bridges
