= Isle of Sheppey =

Island off the coast of Kent, England

Coordinates: 51.391°N 0.831°E

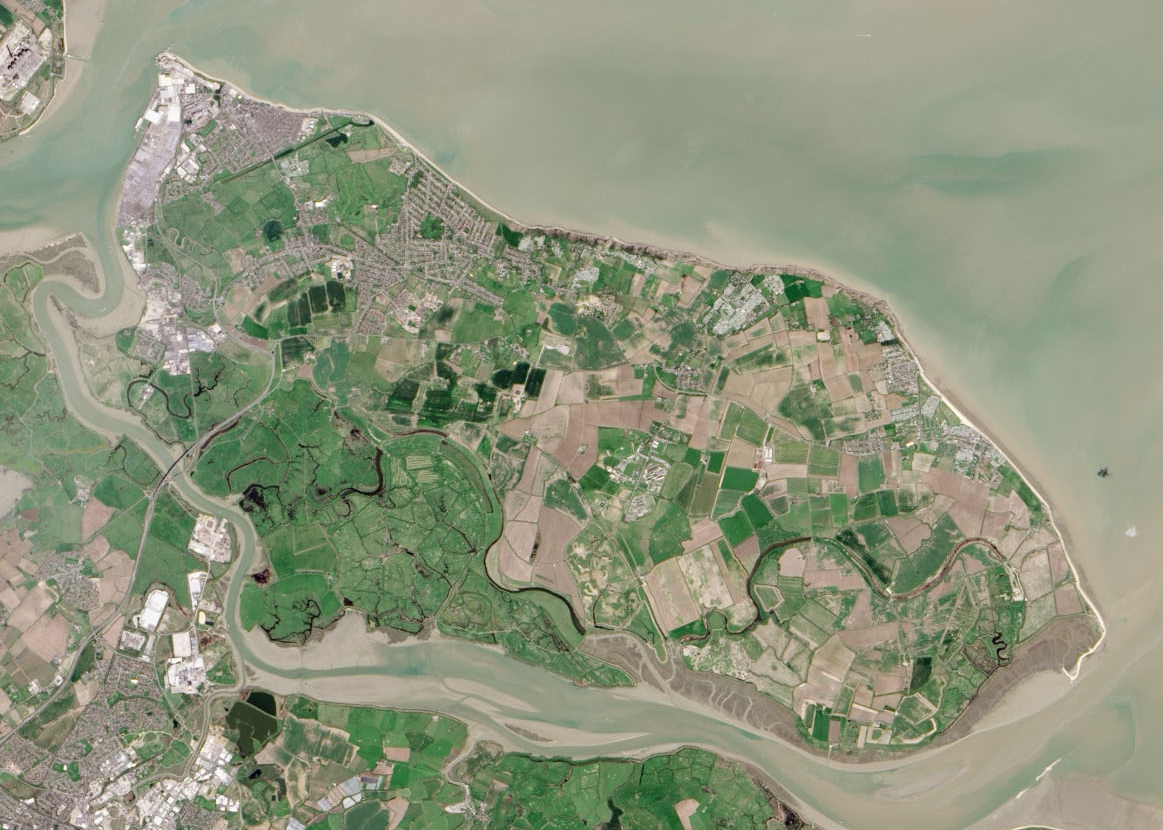
- Sheppey as seen by the Operational Land Imager on the satellite Landsat 8

- Location within Kent
- Interactive map of Isle of Sheppey
- Area: 93 km^{2} (36 sq mi)
- Population: 40,300 (2011 Census)
  - Density: 433/km^{2} (1,120/sq mi)
- OS grid reference: TQ970695
- District: Swale
- Shire county: Kent
- Region: South East
- Country: England
- Sovereign state: United Kingdom
- Post town: Queenborough
- Postcode district: ME11
- Post town: Sheerness
- Postcode district: ME12
- Dialling code: 01795
- Police: Kent
- Fire: Kent
- Ambulance: South East Coast
- UK Parliament: Sittingbourne and Sheppey

The Isle of Sheppey is an island off the northern coast of Kent, England, neighbouring the Thames Estuary, centred 42 miles (68 km) from central London. It has an area of 36 square miles (93 km^{2}). The island forms part of the local government district of Swale. Sheppey is derived from Old English Sceapig, meaning "Sheep Island".

Today's island was historically known as the "Isles of Sheppey" which were Sheppey itself, the Isle of Harty to the south east and the Isle of Elmley to the south west. Over time the channels between the islands have silted up to make one contiguous island, which is now linked by two bridges to the Kentish mainland. Sheppey, like much of north Kent, is largely formed from London Clay and is a plentiful source of fossils. The Mount near Minster rises to 250 feet (76 metres) above sea level and is the highest point on the island. The rest of Sheppey is low-lying and the southern part of the island is marshy land criss-crossed by inlets and drains, largely used for grazing. The economy is driven by a dockyard and port, the presence of three prisons, and various caravan sites.

== The Swale ==
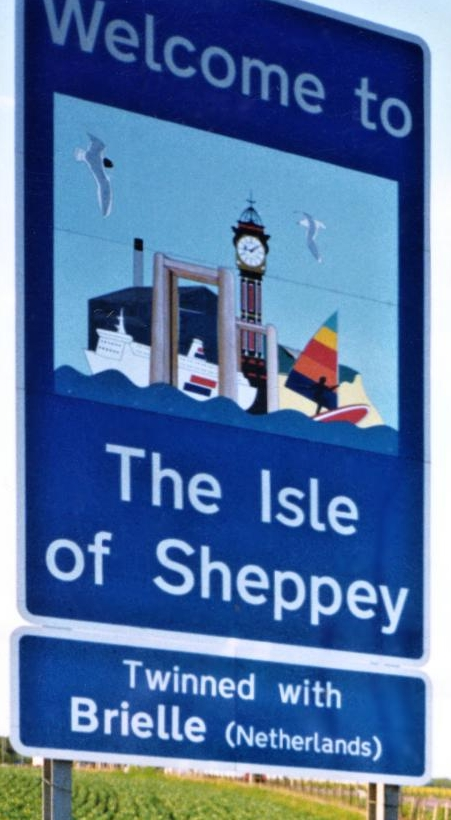
Welcome sign

Sheppey is separated from the mainland by a channel called the Swale. In concert with the Wantsum Channel that once separated the Isle of Thanet from mainland Britain to the east (before it silted over in the late Middle Ages), and Yantlet Creek at the Isle of Grain to the west, it was occasionally used in ancient times by ships navigating to and from ports such as Chatham and London to reduce exposure to bad weather in the Thames Estuary or North Sea.

=== Bridges ===
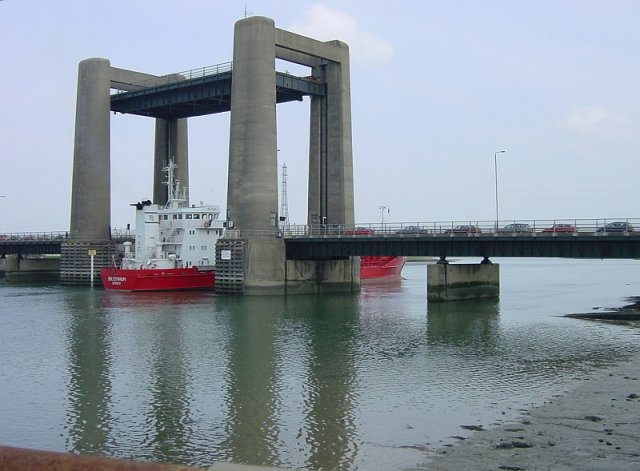
The Kingsferry Bridge, which lifts both road and rail, here letting a ship go through

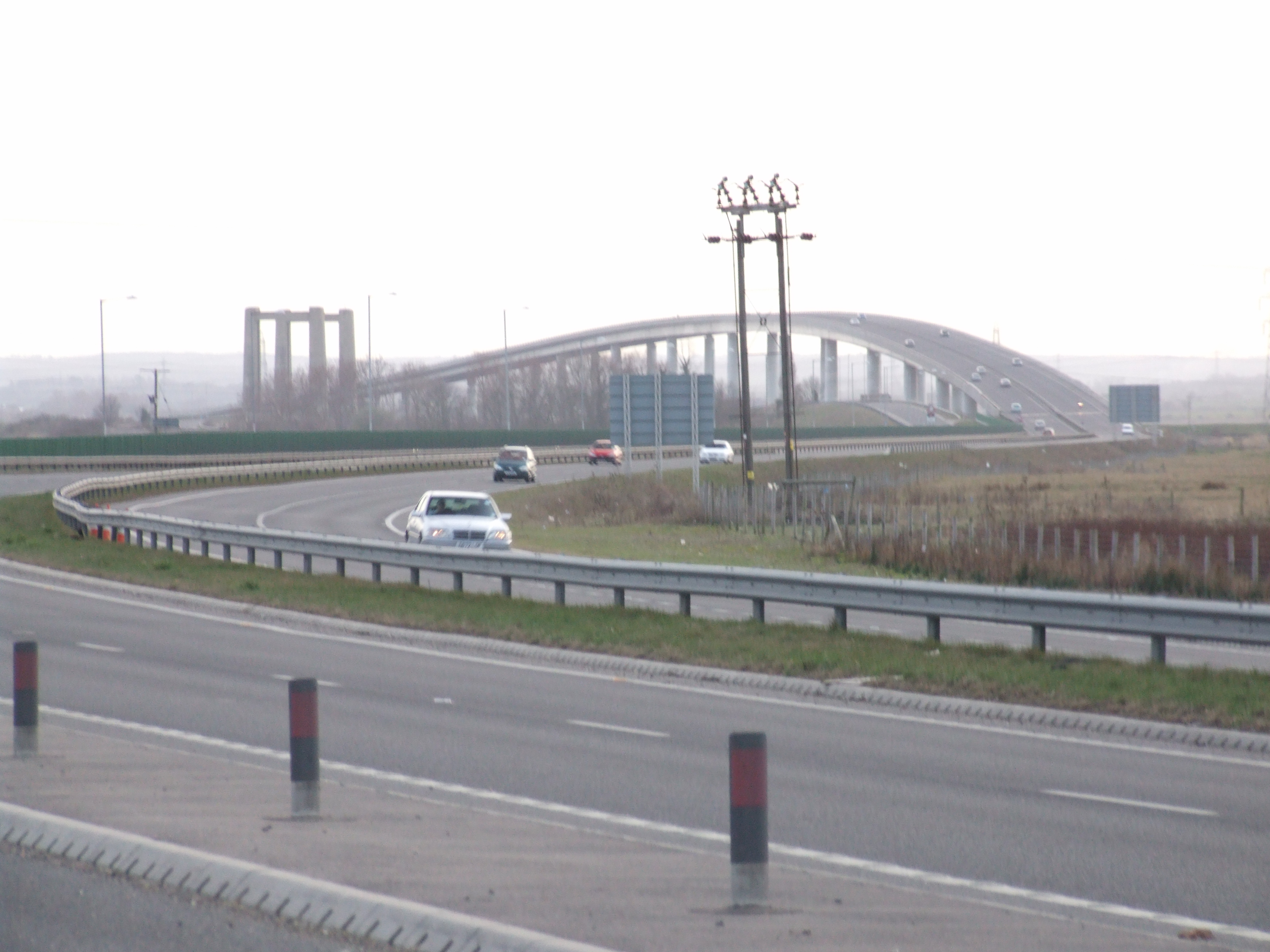
The Sheppey Crossing with the towers of the Kingsferry Bridge at left, seen from the island

The Kingsferry Bridge was first built in 1860, thus eliminating the need for ferries. Over time, there have been four bridges built over the Swale at this point. All bridges had to allow sufficient clearance for shipping heading to the commercial docks at Ridham.

On 19 July 1860 the first bridge came into use. It was built for the London, Chatham and Dover Railway, to an Admiralty design. It had a central span raised between two towers. Trains and road traffic were able to use it, as with the next two bridges.

On 6 November 1906 the second bridge, built for the South Eastern and Chatham Railway, replaced the first. It had a "rolling lift" design that was originally worked by hand, but later by electricity.

In October 1959 Kingsferry Bridge, a lifting bridge, was completed, able to lift both the road and the railway line to allow ships to pass beneath.

In May 2006 the Sheppey Crossing was completed and opened on 3 July. This four-lane road bridge rises to a height of 95 feet (29m) at mean high water springs above the Swale, and carries the A249 trunk road. Pedestrian, animal and bicycle traffic, as well as the railway, are still obliged to use the lifting bridge, which still provides the most direct link between the island and the Iwade/Lower Halstow area.

On 5 September 2013, fog caused a 130 vehicle pile-up on the Sheppey Crossing bridge and its northern approach in which eight people were seriously hurt and another 30 hospitalised.

=== Ferries ===
Four ferries previously connected the island to mainland Kent: the King's Ferry to Iwade, the Harty Ferry to Faversham, one from Elmley, and a passenger ferry connecting to the Port Victoria railway terminus on the Grain Peninsula. The most recently active of these, the Harty Ferry, ceased operation at the start of the First World War, although there was a short lived attempt to start a small hovercraft service between the Harty Ferry Inn and Oare Creek near Faversham in 1970.

== Sheppey history ==
The complex of causewayed enclosures at Kingsborough Manor attests to the importance of the island's high ground during the Neolithic and Bronze Ages. Later prehistoric, Roman and medieval occupation has been found by archaeologists in advance of development at Neat's Court and St Clements CofE Primary School in Leysdown.

=== Vikings ===
In the year 835, Viking invaders attacked Sheppey. It is the first known account of a major Viking raid in Southern England. Sheppey would go on to suffer from subsequent raids, its vulnerable coastal monasteries providing a convenient target for the Danes.

In 855, Sheppey as part of the kingdom of Wessex, became the winter camp of an occupying Viking force, presumably the raiders from prior attacks. Raiding continued in the springtime, with Sheppey's minsters being used by the invaders as feasting halls or general headquarters.

In 1016, Cnut the Great of Denmark and his forces are reported to have retreated to the Island of Sheppey rather than face King Edmund Ironside in battle during the winter. King Edmund gathered his forces during Lent and mounted an attack on Cnut shortly after Easter.

=== Shurland Hall ===
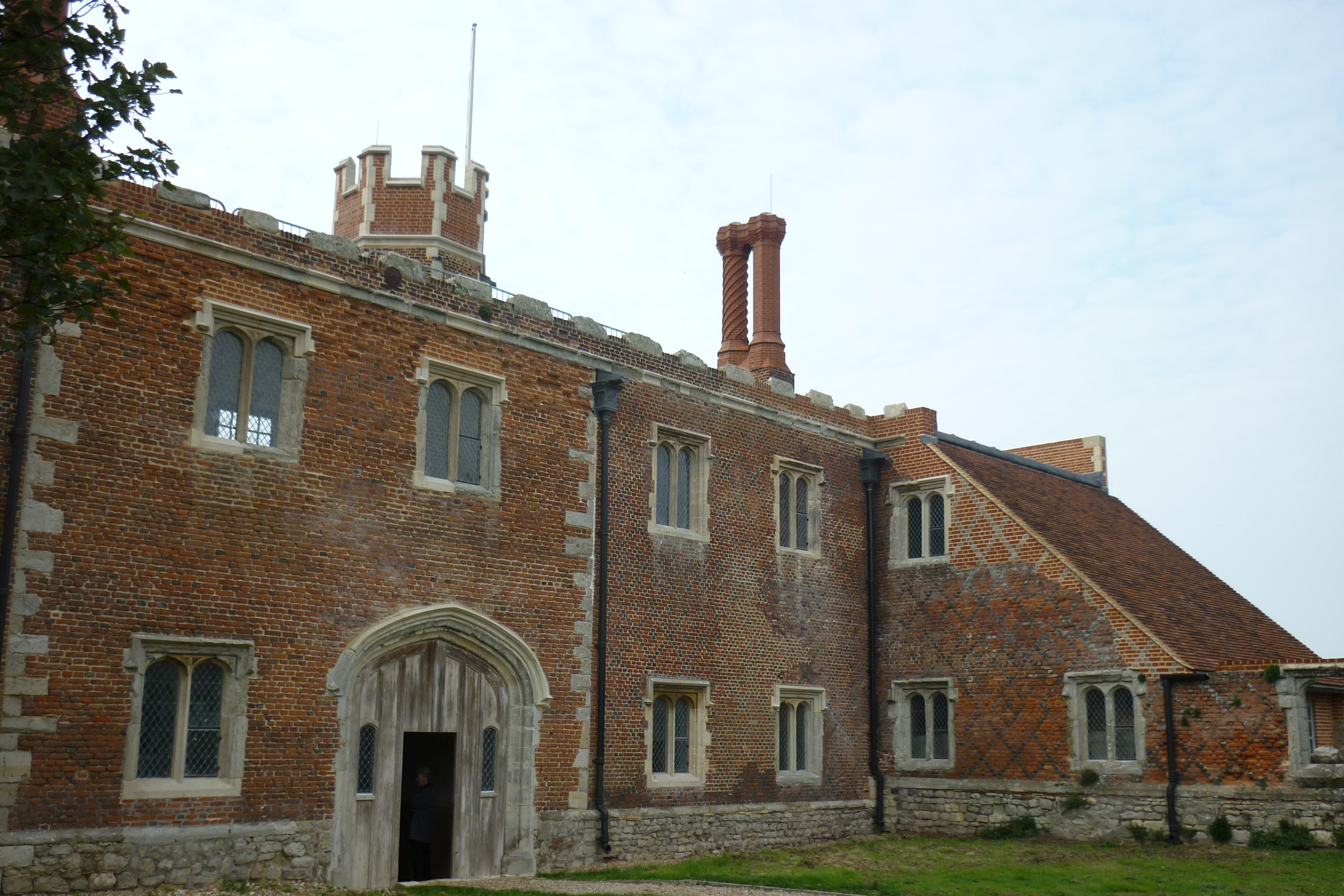
Shurland Hall in 2011

Shurland Hall, near Eastchurch, is named after its first owners, the De Shurland family. In 1188 Adam de Shurland possessed a mill with more than 1,000 acres (405 ha) of mixed land, mostly marsh with a small meadow: he also let a number of cottages thereabouts.

Sir Robert de Shurland (d. 1324), a member of the family, served in the Anglo-Scottish wars, including the siege of Caerlaverock (1300), where he was knighted; and shortly afterwards obtained a charter of free warren for his manor of Ufton, in the parish of Tunstall. He fought on the rebel baronial side at the Battle of Boroughbridge (1322), was captured, and was held for over a year in the Tower of London. On his release, he was appointed mayor of Bordeaux (1323–1324).

A curious legend (first recorded in the 17th century) surrounds Sir Robert. It is said that he killed a priest, and resolved to ask the king for a pardon. Mounted on horseback, he swam out to the Nore (north of Sheppey), where the king's ship was anchored, and gained forgiveness. On his return, he met an old woman who predicted that the horse that had helped save his life would be the cause of his death. To defy the prophecy, Sir Robert killed his horse; but later encountering its bones, he kicked them in scorn, only for a shard to pierce his foot, causing an infection from which he died. The tale takes elements from Italian, Slavic and Icelandic folklore (including the story of Oleg the Wise, and that of Örvar-Oddr). It was greatly popularised in a version published in 1837 by Richard Barham ("Thomas Ingoldsby"), as one of his Ingoldsby Legends.

Sir Robert died in 1324 leaving as his heir a daughter Margaret, who married William, son of Alexander Cheyne of Patrixbourne. To William passed the manor of Shurland. It remained in possession of the Cheyne family until the sixteenth century when it was sold by Sir Henry Cheyne. During the First World War troops were billeted at the Great Hall, and it suffered considerable damage as a result.

Shurland Hall is a Grade II listed building. In 2006 a grant of £300,000 was made by English Heritage to restore the hall's façade. The Spitalfields Historic Buildings Trust carried out the restoration work which was completed in 2011. The house was put on the open market for £1.5 million, and was sold.

=== Dutch occupation of 1667 ===
Sheppey is one of few parts of what is now the United Kingdom to have been (temporarily) lost to a foreign power since William the Conqueror's invasion in 1066. This was in June 1667, when a Dutch fleet sailing up the Thames Estuary for the Medway captured the fort at Sheerness. The fort at the time was incomplete and the garrison underfed and unpaid, so resistance to the heavily armed Dutch Navy (which, according to Samuel Pepys's diary, was also to a large extent composed of deserters from the English Royal Navy) was hardly enthusiastic. Pepys, then secretary of the Navy Board, described Sheerness as lost "after two or three hours' dispute". The Dutch quickly overran and occupied the whole island for several days before withdrawing. Prior to leaving, the Dutch took supplies, ammunition and guns, then burned everything that was combustible.

=== Capture of James II & VII ===
Three miles (5 km) across the Swale lies Whitstable. The Swale channel was the point of departure selected by James II, when departing in some haste "from the Protestant deliverance of the nation" by William of Orange in December 1688.

A hoy having been chartered, the fugitive king landed at Elmley, only to be mobbed by local fishermen. They thought such a noble on such a humble vessel was the locally hated Jesuit Edward Petre and so took his money, watch and coronation ring. At length he was recognised by one of the assailants and the group took him in custody to Faversham, where he was detained.

=== Bluetown Heritage Centre ===
Bluetown hosts the history and Heritage Centre for the Isle of Sheppey. The Heritage Centre contains memorabilia and artefacts pertinent to the Sheppey's history, including displays on aviation, maritime, wartime activities, and island history and offers guided walks of Sheppey Isle and Bluetown.

The present Heritage Centre is on the site of two earlier establishments. Originally called the "New Inn", in 1868 the site became "The Royal Oxford Music Hall". The following year the building, which is situated a few doors down from the Bluetown court house, became the Criterion Public House, with a music hall called the "palace of varieties" situated immediately to its rear. In 1879 the building was replaced with a brick structure.

On 5 June 1917 the Criterion was badly damaged by a German air raid. Shrapnel marks from the attack can still be seen in the dockyard wall opposite the building. After the air raid, the building was re-built in its present form retaining some of its original features. After a variety of other uses, the site became the Heritage Centre in January 2009. A special exhibition in 2014 commemorated the centenary of the First World War.

== Maritime history ==
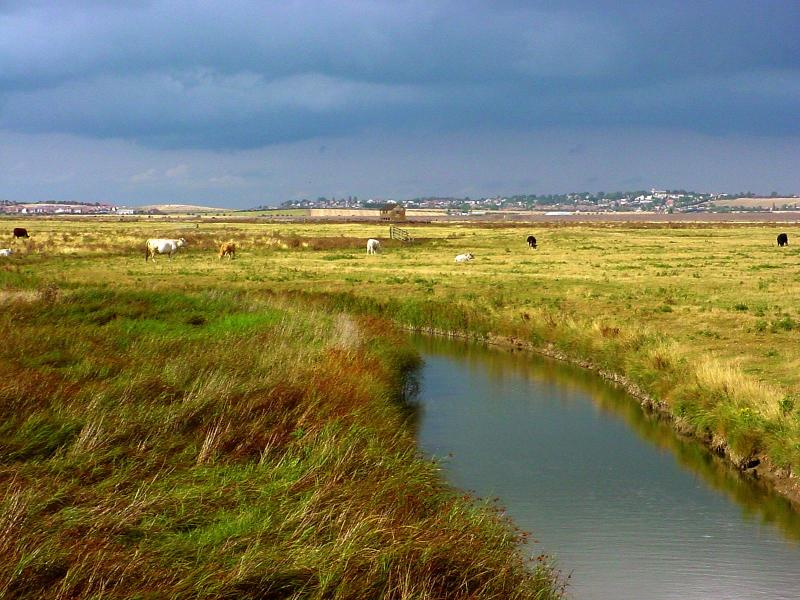
View towards Minster from Elmley Marshes

Henry VIII, requiring the River Medway as an anchorage for his navy, ordered that the mouth of the river should be protected by a small fort. Garrison Fort was built in 1545.

Sheerness is a commercial port and main town of the Isle of Sheppey and owes much to its origins, as a Royal Naval dockyard town. Samuel Pepys established the Royal Navy Dockyard in the 17th century. Sheerness was the focus of an attack by the Dutch Navy in June 1667, when 72 hostile ships compelled the little "sandspit fort" there to surrender and landed a force which for a short while occupied the town. Samuel Pepys at Gravesend remarked in his diary "we do plainly at this time hear the guns play" and in fear departed to Brampton in Huntingdonshire.

The dockyard served the Royal Navy until 1960 and has since developed into one of the largest and fastest expanding ports in the UK. The Port of Sheerness contains at least one Grade II listed building, the Old Boat House. Built in 1866, it is the first multi-storey iron framed industrial building recorded in the UK. Decorated with ornate ironwork, it features operating rails extending the length of the building, for the movement of stores, much like a modern crane.

A large ferry terminal was built by the London, Chatham and Dover Railway at Queenborough Pier in 1876 and operated a nightly service to Flushing (Vlissingen) in the Netherlands, as well as a German mail service. These services ceased during the First World War; the terminal was used for military traffic. The small port was closed and dismantled in the 1930s. A passenger, car and lorry service was operated by Olau Line from 1974 to 1994.

The dockyard and port at Sheerness today are a significant feature of the Isle of Sheppey's economy, which includes the extensive export/import of motor vehicles, and a large steel works, with extensive railway fixtures. The island is, however, suffering from an economic recession and these industries are not as extensive as they once were.

The area immediately outside the dockyard was occupied by dockyard workers, who built wooden houses and decorated them with Admiralty blue paint illegally acquired from the dockyard. This area was, and still is, known as Blue Town, though it is now mostly occupied by the Sheerness Steel complex.

Beyond Blue Town, an outlying residential area overlooking the sea was chiefly designed for various government officials. This area became known as Mile Town because it is one mile (1.6 km) from Sheerness.

About 200 shipwrecks are recorded around the coast of Sheppey, the most famous being the SS Richard Montgomery, a liberty ship loaded with bombs and explosives that grounded on sandbanks during the Second World War. As of 2004 plans were discussed with a view to removing the threat from the Montgomery. These include encasing the ship in concrete or removing the bombs; no firm decision has been made. New research commissioned by the Government in 2005–06 suggested that the threat has passed and that constant surveillance should ensure the safety of the immediate community.

== Natural history ==
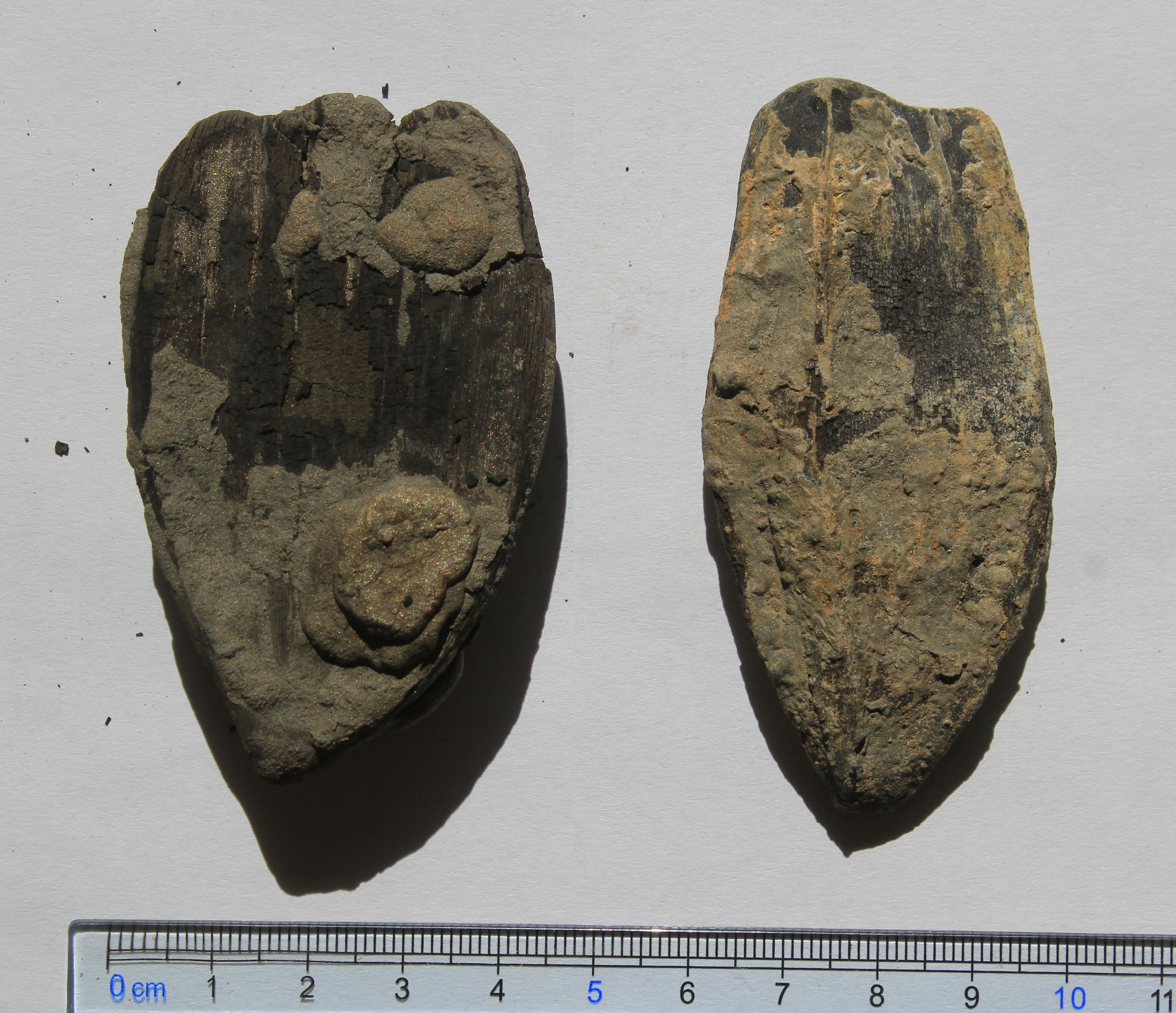
These palm tree fruit fossils of a Nypa species have been found in the Warden Point area of the Isle of Sheppey in Kent, dating from the early Eocene epoch 51–52 million years ago.

In 1629 the first recorded botanical visit was paid to the island by the apothecary Thomas Johnson and colleagues. They were thought to be foreigners so were arrested and imprisoned in Queenborough Castle before being released by the Mayor.

Edward Jacob (1710–1788) purchased the little Manor of Nutts, Isle of Sheppey, in 1752. There, he pursued his hobby as a naturalist. He discovered much of interest to the antiquarian, naturalist, geologist and zoologist, although there was little prior knowledge. In 1777, Jacob published a book about his various fossil finds, including what he called "the remains of an elephant".

The island has an established scorpion population. Euscorpius flavicaudis has been resident since the 1860s, believed to have been imported on a ship. They have been found to be highly adaptable and hence have survived the relative cold by conserving energy and only acting for nutrition and reproduction.

The last known colony in England of the British endemic subspecies of the Essex Emerald moth, at Windmill creek, died out as late as 1991.

In 2008 palaeontologists published details of the fossil skull, found on the island, of a large flying bird from the Eocene epoch called Dasornis in the deposits of the London Clay.

== Local government ==
From 1894 to 1968, Sheppey comprised the Municipal Borough of Queenborough, Sheerness Urban District and Sheppey Rural District (consisting of the civil parishes of Eastchurch, Elmley, Harty, Leysdown-on-Sea, Minster in Sheppey and Warden). In 1968, all these units were abolished and simultaneously a new single Municipal Borough of Queenborough-in-Sheppey was created, covering the entire island. In 1974, this local government unit was abolished and Sheppey then came within the newly created Swale district.

In parliamentary terms, Sheppey has been in the constituency of Sittingbourne and Sheppey since 1997, a Conservative-Labour marginal seat; prior to this it was in the Faversham constituency, also a marginal but held by the Conservatives for the last 27 years of its existence.

== Early aviation ==
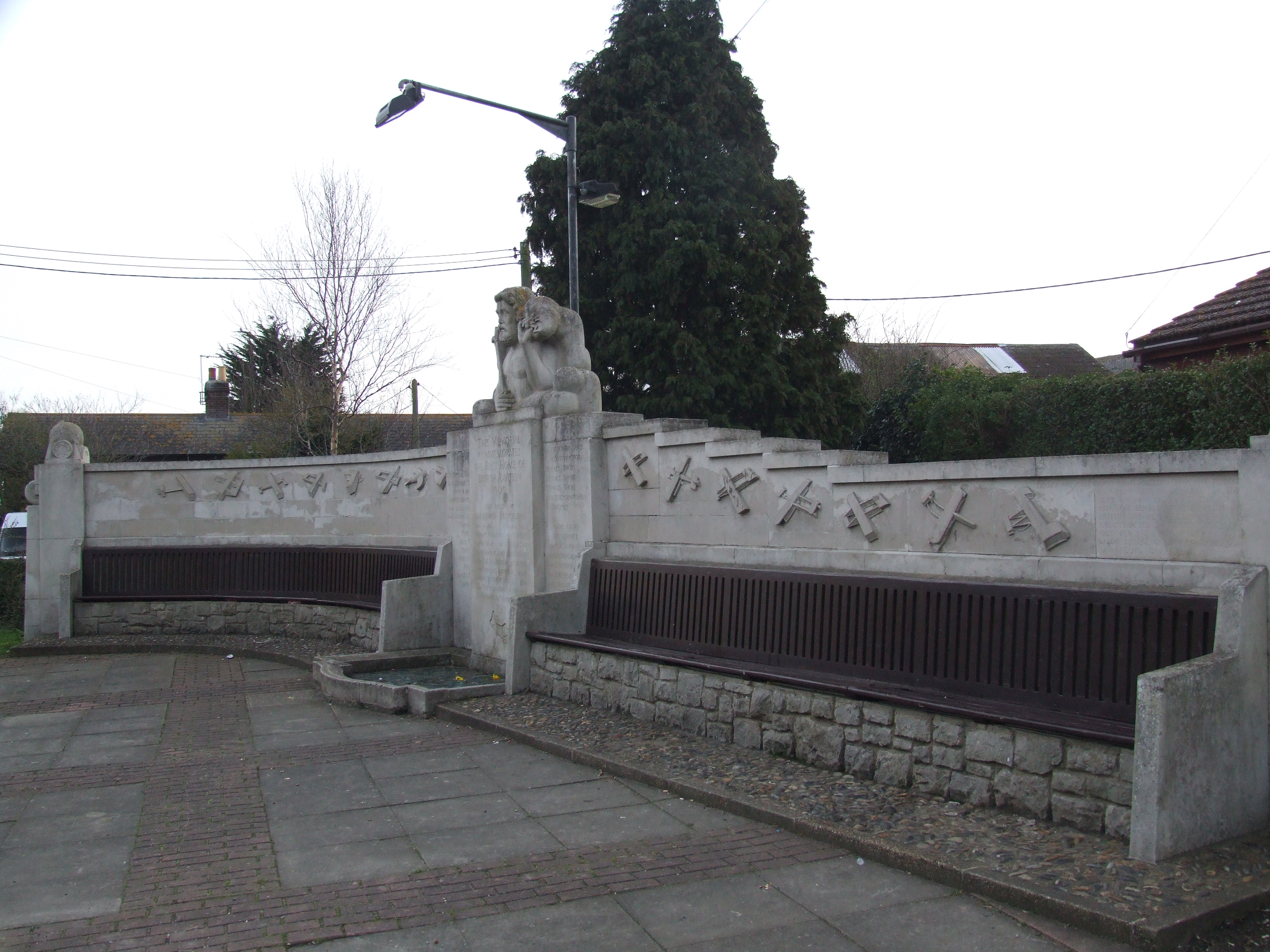
The Memorial to the Home of Aviation in Eastchurch

The island has a long history of aviation development in England. It was home to Lord Brabazon's Royal Aero Club which formed in Leysdown in the early 1900s to popularise ballooning. The club took to the aeroplane with relish, and in July 1909 the Short Brothers established Shellbeach Aerodrome on nearby marshland to accommodate six Wright Flyers, moving a few kilometres the next year to Eastchurch where a new more appropriate aerodrome had been built for the club.

The Eastchurch airfield played a significant role in the history of British aviation from 1909 when Frank McClean acquired Stonepits Farm, on the marshes across from Leysdown, converting the land into an airfield for members of the Aero Club of Great Britain.

The Short brothers, Horace, Eustace and Oswald, built aircraft at Battersea to be tested at the site; later Moore-Brabazon, Professor Huntington, Charles S. Rolls and Cecil Grace all visited and used the flying club's services. Wilbur Wright and his brother Orville came to the Isle of Sheppey to visit the new flying grounds of the Aero Club. In 1909, Moore-Brabazon made the first live cargo flight by fixed-wing aircraft, by tying a waste-paper basket to a wing strut of his Shorts-built Wright aircraft. Then, using it as a "cargo hold", he airlifted one small pig.

The Eastchurch airfield was also the site, in July 1911, of the competition for the Gordon Bennett Cup for powered air racing, attended by flyers from all over the world, and won that year by the American pilot C. T. Weymann.

A stained glass window in the south side of All Saints' Church, Eastchurch (built in 1432), was dedicated to Rolls and Grace, who were killed in July and December 1910 respectively.

In July 2009, Eastchurch celebrated 100 years of aviation history associated with the island. SkySheppey brought together a number of associations and joined with many visitors to recognise the importance of British aviation history that started at Eastchurch.

From March 2015 a new museum, The Aviation Museum Eastchurch, was set up at The Old Mill Green off Brabazon Way, HMP Standford Hill, to commemorate the pioneer aviators and the site as a long established RAF Station serving from WW1 through to the end of WW2.

== Sheppey today ==
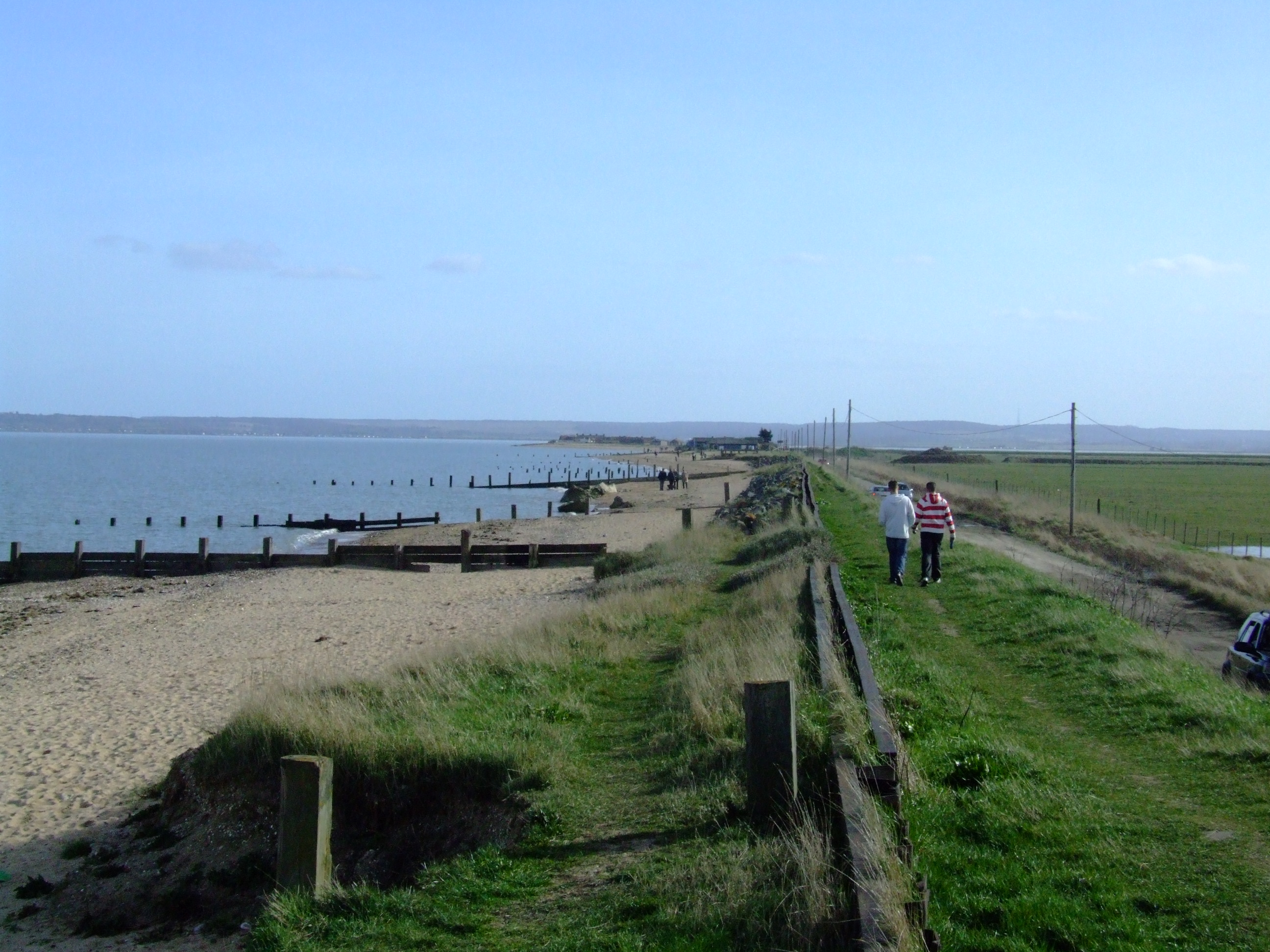
The beach between Leysdown and Shell Ness.

The largest town on the island is Minster with a population of 21,319. Other towns include Sheerness and Leysdown-on-Sea. The whole north coast is dotted with caravan parks and holiday homes; there is also a naturist beach beyond Leysdown, towards Shellness. The Royal Society for the Protection of Birds managed a portion of Elmley National Nature Reserve known as Elmley Marshes up until 2013, at which point it reverted to management by Elmley Conservation Trust, owners of the site.

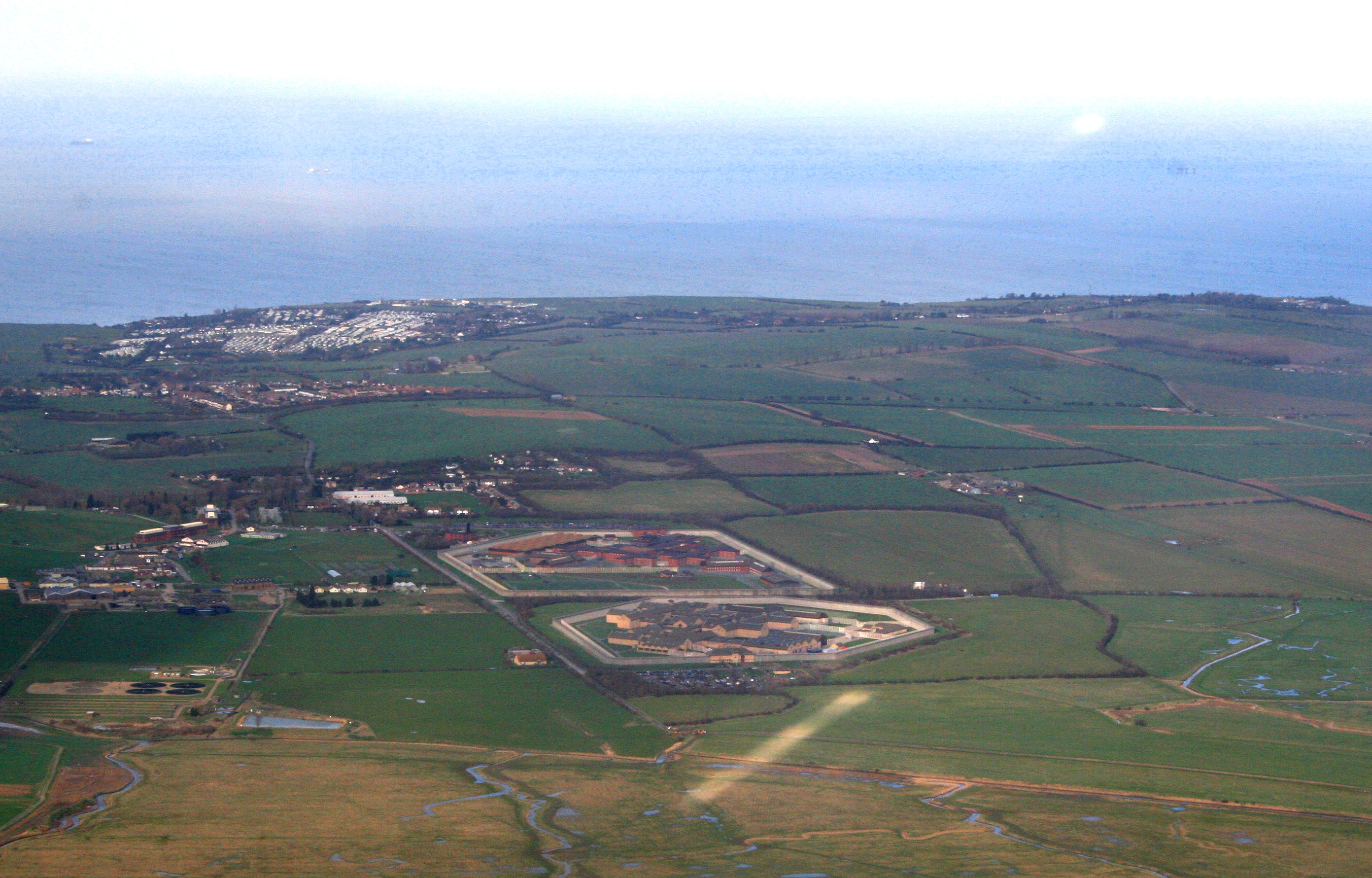
An aerial view of Eastchurch village, a caravan site, the three prisons and the North Sea

There are three prisons on the island, all located to the south of the village of Eastchurch: HMP Elmley, HMP Standford Hill and HMP Swaleside. The total inmate population is in the region of 2,800.

In the 2011 census, the island had a resident population of 40,300, many of whom commute to the mainland via the Sheerness-Sittingbourne rail link and the new Sheppey Crossing Bridge.

== Education ==
Secondary education on the island was provided by Oasis Academy Isle of Sheppey. In August 2024 the school closed and was split into two new secondary schools: Leigh Academy Minster and EKC Sheppey Secondary.

Further education is provided by EKC Sheppey College.

There are several primary schools on the island.

== Sport and leisure ==
The island has a non-league football club, Sheppey United F.C., based at Holm Park and who play in the Isthmian League South East Division. In 2024, K Sports F.C. rebranded to Sheppey Sports FC following a relocation from Aylesford to Holm Park.

The island's largest cricket club is Minster Cricket Club, who compete in the Kent Cricket League. Sheppey Cricket Club plays in the Kent Regional Cricket League.

The island also has a rugby union club, Sheppey RFC.

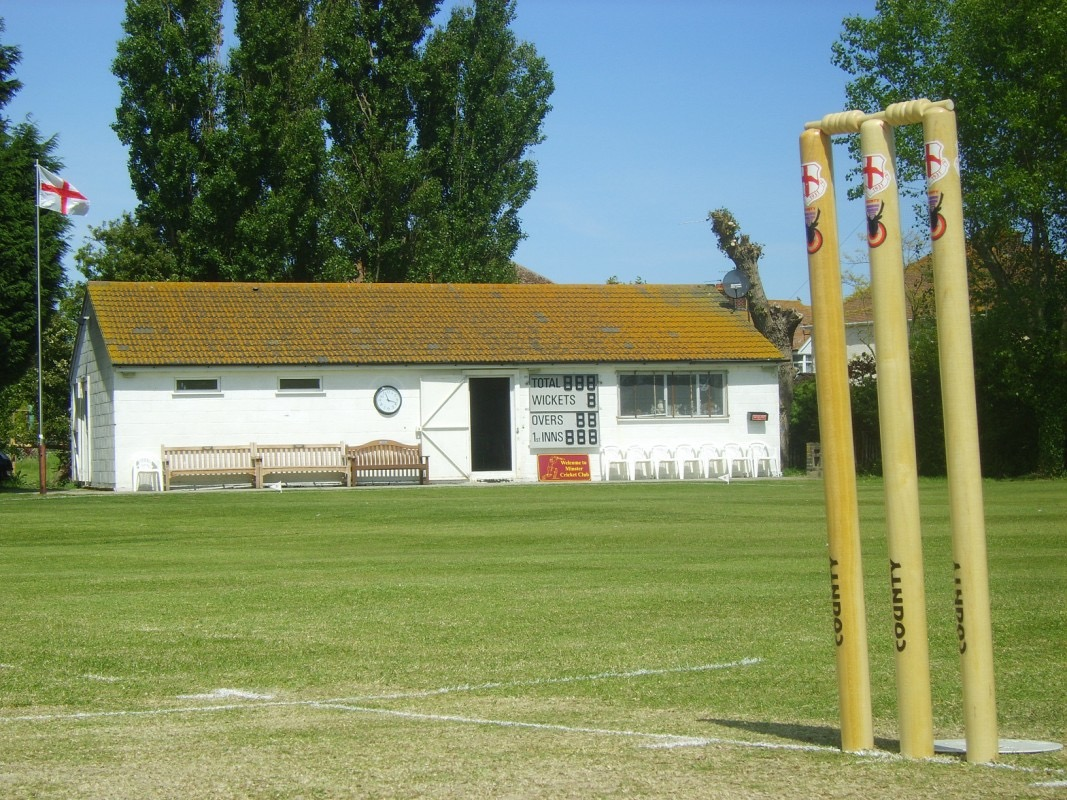
Minster Cricket Club Pavilion

The Isle of Sheppey Sailing Club (previously Sheppey Yacht Club) organises the Round the Isle of Sheppey Race, established in 1959, and other races for mono hulls and catamarans.

The Isle of Sheppey is home to The Sheppey Pirates, initially set up in 1997 to promote the island as a holiday venue with a 'World Walking the Plank Championships'. The group continues although the plank walking was stopped. The Sheppey Pirates developed into a reenactment group with live fire cannon and small arms. The group fundraise at some events for the RNLI.

== Local media ==
Local news and television programmes are provided by BBC South East and ITV Meridian. Television signals are received from the Bluebell Hill TV transmitter.

The island is served by county-wide radio stations: BBC Radio Kent on 96.7 FM, Heart South on 102.8 FM and Gold on 603 AM.

Three radio stations broadcast from Sheppey: BRFM 95.6 FM broadcasts 24 hours a day from studios on the Minster Cliffs; Sheppey FM 92.2 is a community radio station based in the Heritage Pavilion, Sheerness; and Hospital Radio Swale which broadcasts from the Sheppey Community Hospital in Minster.

The Sheerness Times Guardian is the island's local weekly newspaper.

== Airport ==
Various concepts for a Thames Estuary Airport have been proposed since the 1940s, with two such concepts were based on creating an offshore artificial island north east of the Isle of Sheppey. The most recent was a 2008 concept supported by the then Mayor of London, Boris Johnson, who felt that the artificial island off Sheppey would be a viable alternative to creating a new third runway at Heathrow.

== Film and show appearances ==
Films
Title	Year of Release	Appearance Details
The Hide	2008	Filmed entirely on the Isle of Sheppey, this movie follows an obsessive-compulsive bird watcher who assists a fugitive from a storm. The two men soon find themselves facing the news of a police manhunt in the area.
The Sweeney	2012	A dramatic high-speed car chase took part in Queenborough, before heading into the Caravan Park near the Minster Cilffs.
Ginger and Rosa	2012	Multiple boating scenes including a floating jetty were filmed on and around the Isle of Sheppey.
Strawberry Fields	2012	Shots focusing on the countryside included the Isle of Sheppey.
The Beekeeper	2024	Jason Statham filmed a stunt scene on the Kingsferry Bridge, the bridge connecting the Isle of Sheppey to the main land. Statham uses a ratchet strap to tie a man to a vehicle before it drives off the bridge.

Shows
Title	Year of Appearance	Episode	Appearance Details
Some Mothers Do 'Ave 'Em	1975	S2, E8	Frank Spencer takes a driving test throughout the Isle of Sheppey and adjoining area. Taking a break on the Kingsferry Bridge, the episode ends with a test ending dive into the sea.
Great Expectations	1989		The young Orphan Phillip Pirrup meets the sinister escaped convict, Abel Magwitch, at the St Thomas the Apostle Church in Harty, Leysdown.
Dr Who	2011	S6, E5	Isle of Sheppey is referenced by the Doctor as an acid mining Island. An electrical Surge resulted in a Ganger being able to act on its own accord.
Top Gear	2012	S18, E3	Jeremy Clarkson & Richard Hammond attempt to film a car chase for the upcoming film The Sweeney.
Hunted	2016	S2, E6	The final episode concludes with the fugitives needing to race to a finish line which is a boat moored on the Isle of Sheppey.
The End of the F***ing World	2017	All Episodes	Filmed in and around Leysdown, the Isle of Sheppey lays host to this whole series.
Too Close	2021		Production visited the Kingsferry Bridge to film a stunt sequence. The Kingsferry Bridge connects the Isle of Sheppey to the main land.

== See also ==
- Sheppey Light Railway
- Islands in the River Thames

Next island upstream	River Thames	Next island downstream
Two Tree Island	Isle of Sheppey	Nore (Sandbank)
