= A249 road =

Road in Kent, England

A249

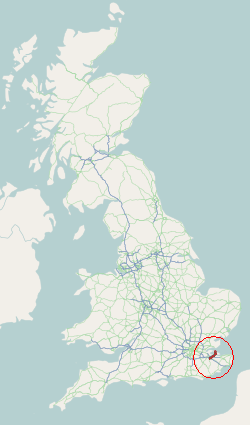

Route information
- Length: 18.6 mi (29.9 km)

Major junctions
- South end: Maidstone; 51.2704°N 0.5255°E
- M2 M20 A2; A20 A229 A250
- North end: Sheerness; 51.4422°N 0.7572°E

Location
- Country: United Kingdom

Road network
- Roads in the United Kingdom; Motorways; A and B road zones

The A249 is a major road in Kent, England, running from Maidstone to Sheerness. It also connects the M2 and M20 motorways and links Dover and London to the Isle of Sheppey.

== History ==
=== Traffic congestion and improvements ===
In the 1960s, the A249 was improved to a dual carriageway between Maidstone and junction 5 of the M2 near Sittingbourne in anticipation of increased traffic levels caused by the opening of the M2 and M20 motorways. In the 1990s, the dual carriageway was extended northwards from the M2 to Kingsferry Bridge, which included a bypass of Iwade. Traffic congestion on Kingsferry Bridge led to the Sheppey Crossing being constructed from 2004 to 2006, extending the dual carriageway to Queenborough.

From June 2021 to February 2025, National Highways remodelled junction 5 of the M2 at a cost of £100 million to provide a flyover for A249 through traffic and improved connections between the M2 and A249. The main aims of the scheme were to improve capacity, connectivity, and safety. Graham Construction was contracted to rebuild the junction.

=== Incidents and safety issues ===
In 2000, Margaret Kuwertz and her granddaughter, Jade Hobbs, were killed in a traffic collision at a pedestrian crossing near Detling. In 2005, Jade's Crossing, a footbridge named after Hobbs, was opened to replace the at-grade crossing and to improve safety. The Jade Appeal, which was created to campaign for road safety improvements, raised £35,000 in the aftermath of the collision. The funds went towards educating schoolchildren about road safety.

On 5 September 2013, a pile-up involving 130 vehicles took place on the Sheppey Crossing, causing 60 injuries and the closure of the crossing for nine hours. In 2014, a 50 mph speed limit was introduced on the crossing to improve safety. However, it was rescinded in 2016 due to a lack of compliance.

== Gallery ==
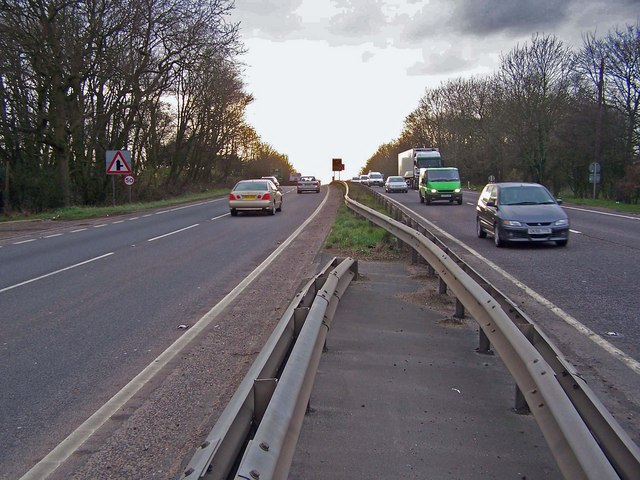
The A249 on Detling Hill, facing west towards Maidstone

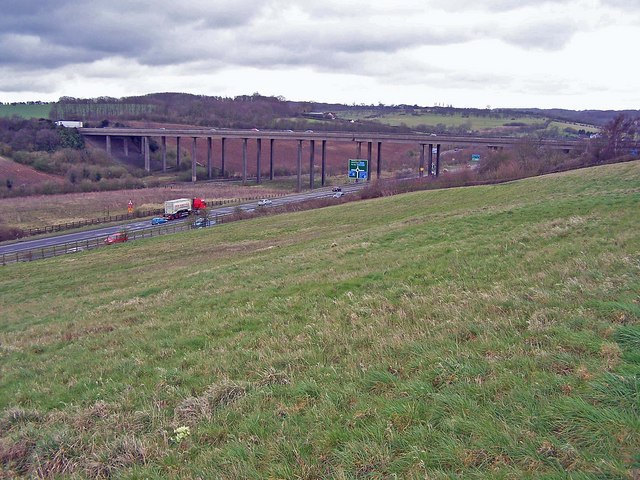
The A249 passing under the M2

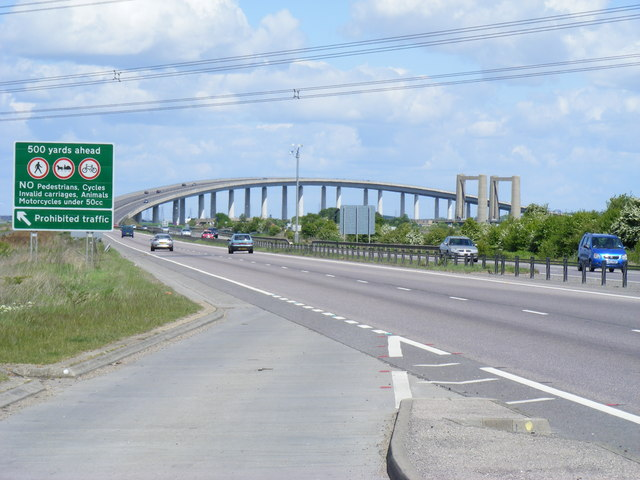
The A249 approaching the Sheppey Crossing from the south
