= 45th (Nottinghamshire) (Sherwood Foresters) Regiment of Foot =

- 1874–1881 regimental glengarry badge
- Active: 1741–1881
- Country: Great Britain; United Kingdom
- Branch: British Army
- Type: Infantry
- Role: Line infantry
- Size: One battalion (1741–1804, 1814–1881); Two battalions (1804–1814); 1804–1814)
- Garrison/HQ: Glen Parva Barracks, Leicestershire
- Nickname: "Old Stubborns"
- Engagements: War of the Austrian Succession; Father Le Loutre's War; French and Indian War; American War of Independence; French Revolutionary and Napoleonic Wars; First Anglo-Burmese War; Seventh Xhosa War; British expedition to Abyssinia

The 45th (Nottinghamshire) (Sherwood Foresters) Regiment of Foot was a line infantry regiment of the British Army. Raised in 1741 as Daniel Houghton's Regiment of Foot for service in the War of the Austrian Succession, the regiment was sent to Gibraltar in 1745, the same year it was renamed Hugh Warburton's Regiment of Foot after the new regimental colonel. The regiment was ranked as the 56th Regiment of Foot as sent as garrison troops to Nova Scotia in 1747, and was re-ranked as the 45th Regiment of Foot in the next year; in 1751 the regiment became officially known by its numeral designation. It proceeded to serve in Father Le Loutre's War and the French and Indian War.

The regiment served in the American War of Independence before returning to England in 1778. As the result of requests made by citizens of Nottinghamshire the regiment was renamed the 45th (1st Nottinghamshire) Regiment of Foot in 1779. The regiment was sent to the West Indies in 1786 on garrison duty and was stationed in Martinique, Dominica and the Îles des Saintes during the French Revolutionary Wars. In 1807 the regiment took part in the British invasions of the River Plate as part of the Napoleonic Wars. The regiment was sent to Portugal in 1808 to serve in the Peninsular War and served in the Iberian Peninsula until in 1814, when it returned to England.

In 1819 the regiment was sent to British Ceylon and in 1824 was redeployed to Burma to serve in the First Anglo-Burmese War. It returned to England in 1838 and took part in the Battle of Bossenden Wood. In 1839 the regiment participated in the Newport Rising's suppression before being sent to the Cape Colony in 1843 and serving in the Seventh Xhosa War in 1846. The regiment was renamed the "45th (Nottinghamshire) (Sherwood Foresters) Regiment of Foot" in 1866 and served in the British expedition to Abyssinia in 1867. Under the Childers Reforms the regiment was amalgamated with the 95th (Derbyshire) Regiment of Foot to form the Sherwood Foresters (Nottinghamshire and Derbyshire Regiment) in 1881.

== History ==
=== War of the Austrian Succession ===
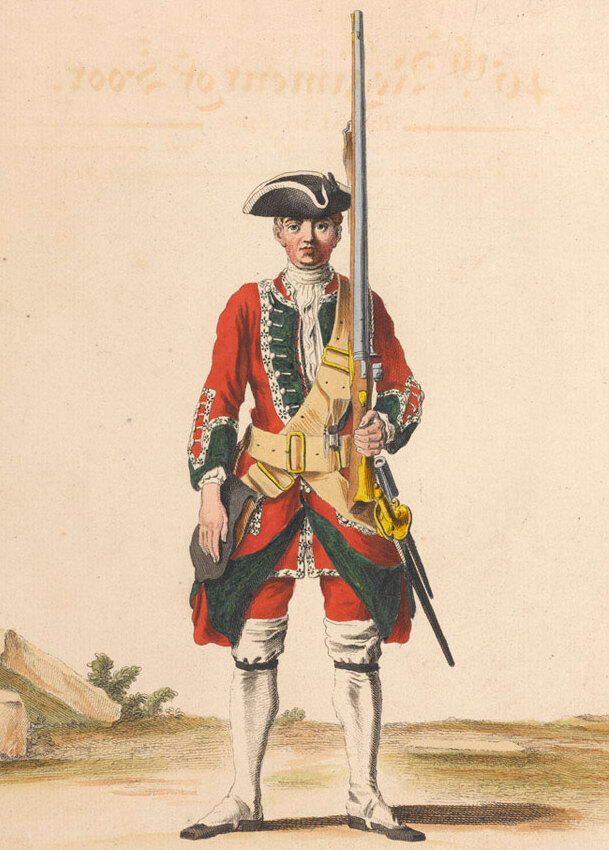
c. 1742 engraving of a regimental private

The regiment was originally raised by Colonel Daniel Houghton as Daniel Houghton's Regiment of Foot in 1741 for service in the War of the Austrian Succession. From 1745, the regiment was renamed Hugh Warburton's Regiment of Foot after its new colonel Hugh Warburton. It was first posted to Gibraltar in 1745, before moving to Nova Scotia in 1747 for garrison duty under Warburton.

=== French and Indian Wars ===
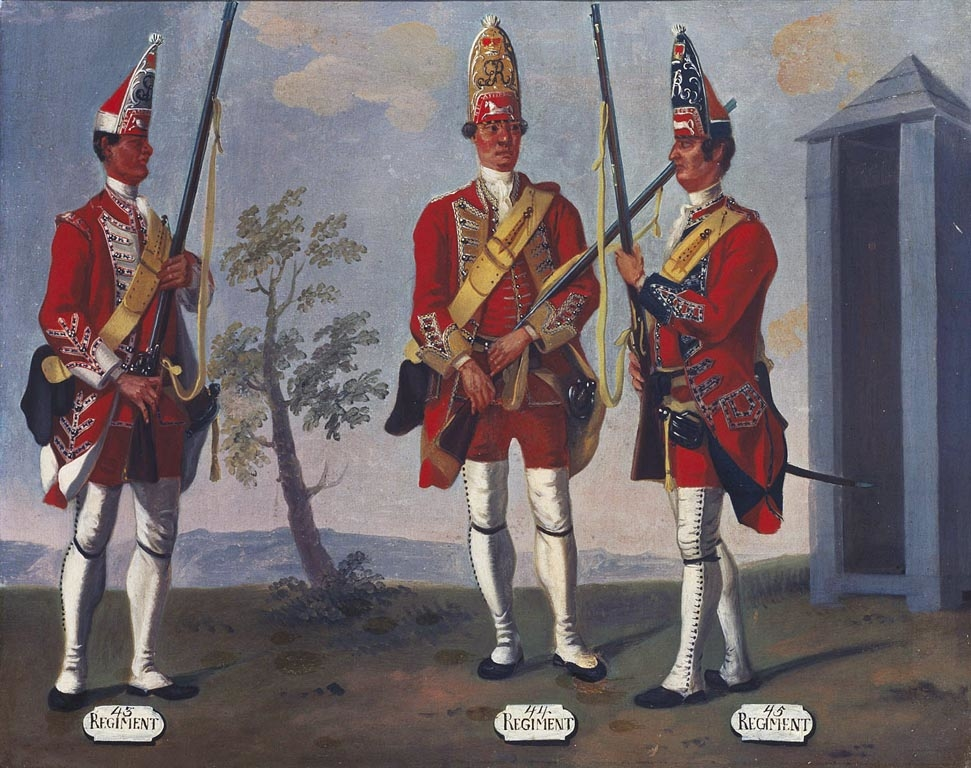
c. 1751 painting of a regimental grenadier (right)

The regiment was ranked as the 56th Regiment of Foot in 1747 but was re-ranked the following year as the 45th Regiment of Foot in 1748. On 1 July 1751 the regiment officially adopted the numerical system as its official name rather being named after the regimental colonel. The regiment was attacked during the raid on Dartmouth in May 1751 during Father Le Loutre's War when Acadians and French-allied Indians under Joseph Broussard raided Dartmouth, Nova Scotia, destroying the town, killing twenty colonists and torturing and mutilating a regimental sergeant. The regiment subsequently defeated a French and Indian force at the Battle of Fort Beauséjour in June 1755. It also took part in the siege of Louisbourg in July 1758 during the French and Indian War.

=== American War of Independence ===
The regiment also saw action in North America during the American War of Independence, fighting at the Battle of Long Island in August 1776 before returning to England in 1778. In 1779 the citizens of Nottinghamshire petitioned for the regiment to have the county name included in the regimental name: this was granted and the regiment became the 45th (1st Nottinghamshire) Regiment of Foot. In March 1786 the regiment embarked for the West Indies.

=== French Revolutionary and Napoleonic Wars ===
The regiment garrisoned Martinique, Dominica and the Îles des Saintes during the French Revolutionary Wars. In May 1801, on the home journey, some 150 French prisoners aboard the ship, the Windsor, overpowered the guard, locked the officers in their cabins and took possession of the ship. In spring 1807 the regiment embarked on the disastrous British invasion of the River Plate: it saw action at the Second Battle of Buenos Aires in July 1807 but, in the face of defeat, discipline collapsed and 11 regimental troops deserted. However another unit of the regiment successfully charged the Spanish colonial forces opposing them, captured two howitzers and several prisoners.

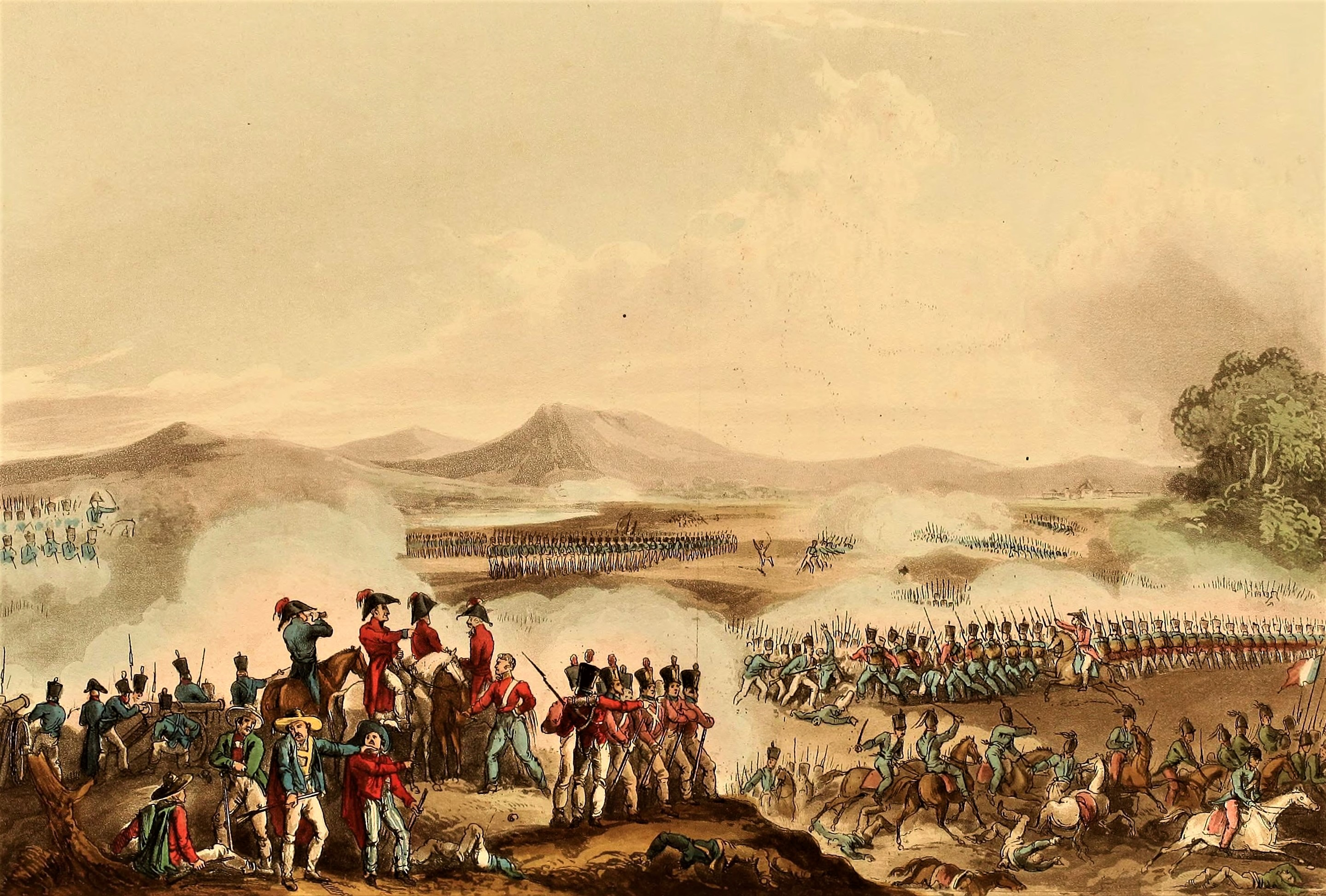
The Battle of Talavera, which the regiment fought in

The regiment embarked for Portugal in July 1808 to serve under General Sir Arthur Wellesley in the Peninsular War. The regiment fought at the Battle of Roliça in August 1808, the Battle of Vimeiro later that month and the Battle of Talavera, where it won the nickname "Old Stubborns", in July 1809. The regiment went on to fight at the Battle of Bussaco in September 1810 before falling back to the Lines of Torres Vedras. It saw action again at Battle of Fuentes de Oñoro in May 1811, the Siege of Ciudad Rodrigo in January 1812 and the Siege of Badajoz in March 1812 before fighting at the Battle of Salamanca in July 1812 and the Battle of Vitoria in June 1813. It then pursued the French Army into France and fought at the Battle of the Pyrenees in July 1813, the Battle of Nivelle in November 1813 and the Battle of Orthez in February 1814 as well as the Battle of Toulouse in April 1814. The regiment returned home in June 1814.

The regiment was sent to British Ceylon in January 1819 and to Burma in 1824 for service in the First Anglo-Burmese War. It formed part of an army which advanced up the River Irrawaddy to the Kingdom of Ava and then returned to England in March 1838.

=== Victorian era ===
Regimental soldiers (left) at the Battle of Bossenden Wood

1853 portrait of a regimental lieutenant

Regimental troops forming an infantry square, c. 1860

In May 1838 the regiment took part in the Battle of Bossenden Wood, a skirmish between a small group of labourers from the Hernhill, Dunkirk, and Boughton area and a detachment of soldiers of the 45th regiment sent from Canterbury to arrest the marchers' leader, the self-styled Sir William Courtenay, who was actually John Nichols Thom, a Truro maltster who had spent four years in Kent County Lunatic Asylum. In November 1839 the regiment was involved in suppressing the Newport Rising which had been organised by Chartist protestors.

The regiment was deployed to the Cape Colony in 1843 and saw action in the Seventh Xhosa War in 1846 and the Eighth Xhosa War in 1851 before returning home in 1859. In 1866, the regiment became the 45th (Nottinghamshire) (Sherwood Foresters) Regiment of Foot. It took part in the British expedition to Abyssinia in 1867. As part of the Cardwell Reforms of the 1870s, where single-battalion regiments were linked together to share a single depot and recruiting district in the United Kingdom, the 45th was linked with the 17th (Leicestershire) Regiment of Foot), and assigned to district no. 27 at Glen Parva Barracks in Leicestershire. On 1 July 1881 the Childers Reforms came into effect and the regiment amalgamated with the 95th (Derbyshire) Regiment to form the Sherwood Foresters.

== Battle honours ==
The regiment's battle honours were as follows:

- Louisburg,
- Rolica, Vimiero, Talavera, Busaco, Fuentes D'Onoro, Ciudad Rodrigo, Badajoz, Salamanca, Vittoria, Pyrenees, Nivelle, Orthes, Toulouse, Peninsula,
- Ava,
- South Africa 1846–47,

== Colonels of the Regiment ==
Colonels of the regiment were:

- 1741–1745: Brig-Gen. Daniel Houghton

=== 45th Regiment of Foot – (1751) ===
- 1745–1761: Gen. Hugh Warburton
- 1761: Maj-Gen. Andrew Robinson
- 1761–1767: Maj-Gen. Hon. John Boscawen
- 1767–1784: Gen. William Haviland

=== 45th (Nottinghamshire) Regiment of Foot ===
- 1784–1787: Maj-Gen. Sir John Wrottesley, 8th Baronet
- 1787–1788: Lt-Gen. James Cuninghame
- 1788–1802: Gen. James Whorwood Adeane
- 1802–1823: Gen. Frederick Cavendish Lister
- 1823–1837: Gen. Richard Lambart, 7th Earl of Cavan, KC
- 1837–1840: Lt-Gen. Sir William Henry Pringle, GCB
- 1840–1847: Gen. Sir Fitzroy Jeffries Grafton Maclean, Bt.
- 1847–1856: Gen. Sir Colin Halkett, GCB, GCH
- 1856–1858: Gen. Thomas Brabazon Aylmer
- 1858–1866: F.M. Sir Hugh Rose, 1st Baron Strathnairn, GCB, GCSI

=== 45th (Nottinghamshire) (Sherwood Foresters) Regiment of Foot ===
- 1866–1868: Gen. Thomas Armstrong Drought
- 1868–1876: Gen. Frederick Horn, GCB
- 1876–1878: Lt-Gen. Henry Cooper
- 1878–1881: Gen. Sir Daniel Lysons, GCB

== Sources ==
- Dalbiac, Philip Hugh (1902). History of the 45th: 1st Nottinghamshire Regiment (Sherwood Foresters). London: Swan Sonnenschein & Co. OCLC 1850546.
- Hughes, Ben (2013). The British Invasion of the River Plate 1806–1807: How the Redcoats were Humbled and a Nation was Born. Praetorian Press. ISBN 978-1781590669.
- Smith, Steve (2005). Wellington's Redjackets: The 45th (Nottinghamshire) Regiment on Campaign in South America and the Peninsula, 1805–14. Barnsley: Frontline Books. ISBN 978-1-47-385175-7.
- Wilson, John (1751). A genuine narrative of the transactions in Nova Scotia since the settlement June 1749 until 5 August 1751. A Henderson & others.
