= Henry Boswell Bennett =

British Army officer (1809–1838)

Lieutenant Henry Boswell Bennett (1809 - 31 May 1838) of the 45th Regiment of Foot (Sherwood Foresters) was the first officer to die in the service of Queen Victoria when he was shot by John Nichols Thom in Bossenden Wood in Kent.

Bennett was of Irish parentage, born in 1809, the son of Major William Bennett formerly of the 69th Regiment of Foot, and the grandson of Richard Bennett who was murdered during the Wexford Rebellion of 1798. An uncle, Richard Newton Bennett was chief justice of the Island of Tobago. Bennett joined his father's regiment, the 69th, as an ensign and then, in June 1827, exchanged into the 45th Foot. He spent the next ten years with the regiment in India, returning to Europe on leave in July 1837. The regiment returned from India the following March and Bennett rejoined them at Canterbury barracks.

Since January 1838 a man who went by the name of Sir William Courtenay, but was believed to be a Cornish maltster called John Nichols Thom (or Mad Tom), and who had been released from Barming Heath Asylum some months previously, had been riding through East Kent and gaining a following amongst the labourers, smallholders, artisans and tradespeople of the area between Canterbury and Faversham. Courtenay promised his followers a better future with greater equality and fairer distribution of wealth, addressing their concerns about low wages, lack of work, and the New Poor Law. Early on the morning of 31 May 1838, the constable of Boughton-under-Blean was sent to arrest Courtenay at Bossenden Farm. He had enlisted the help of his brother and, when they arrived at the farm, Courtenay shot and killed the constable's brother. On hearing the news of the murder, local magistrates called out the soldiers from Canterbury barracks.

A detachment of the 45th Infantry under Major Armstrong with three junior officers, including Bennett, arrived in a stage-coach and wagons and met up with the magistrates. Courtenay and his followers, who numbered between thirty and forty, were tracked down to Bossenden Wood. Except for Courtenay, who had a sword and pistols, and one of his followers who had a pistol, the band was armed only with sticks. The soldiers formed a pincer movement: Major Armstrong and Lieutenant Prendergast led the left wing, while Captain Reid and Bennett led the right. They marched down two parallel lanes leading from Watling Street to Bossenden Wood and then Bennett and 25 men split off to the north side of the wood. It was Bennett's group that was the first to encounter Courtenay and his followers in a clearing in the wood. Bennett immediately called on Courtenay to surrender; Courtenay shot him dead. Armstrong's and Bennett's men then opened fire and charged with bayonets. Within a few minutes Courtenay was dead. Eight of his followers were killed or mortally wounded, and a constable was caught in the soldiers' fire and killed.

Bennett was buried in Canterbury Cathedral precincts on Saturday 2 June with full military honours and in the presence of six thousand spectators. In view of the special circumstances the Cathedral Chapter waived the normal ban on the firing of guns in the precincts, and three volleys were fired over the grave at the end of the funeral service. Later a tablet which can still be seen was affixed to the north wall of the Cathedral nave in memory of Bennett. It bears the following inscription.

Within the cloisters of this Cathedral are desposited the remains of
HENRY BOSWELL BENNETT
(Lieutenant in the 45th Regiment)
who fell in the strict and manly discharge of his duties,
in Bossenden Wood, in the Ville of Dunkirk,
on 31 May 1838. Aged 29 years.

In August 1838 nine of Courtenay's followers pleaded guilty at Maidstone Assizes to the murder of Bennett. They were sentenced to death, but immediately reprieved and given sentences of transportation or one year's imprisonment. When sentencing the prisoners Judge Lord Denman said Bennett's relations and friends asked that their lives be spared.

== See also ==
- Battle of Bossenden Wood
