= John Nichols Thom =

Cornish wine-merchant and maltster

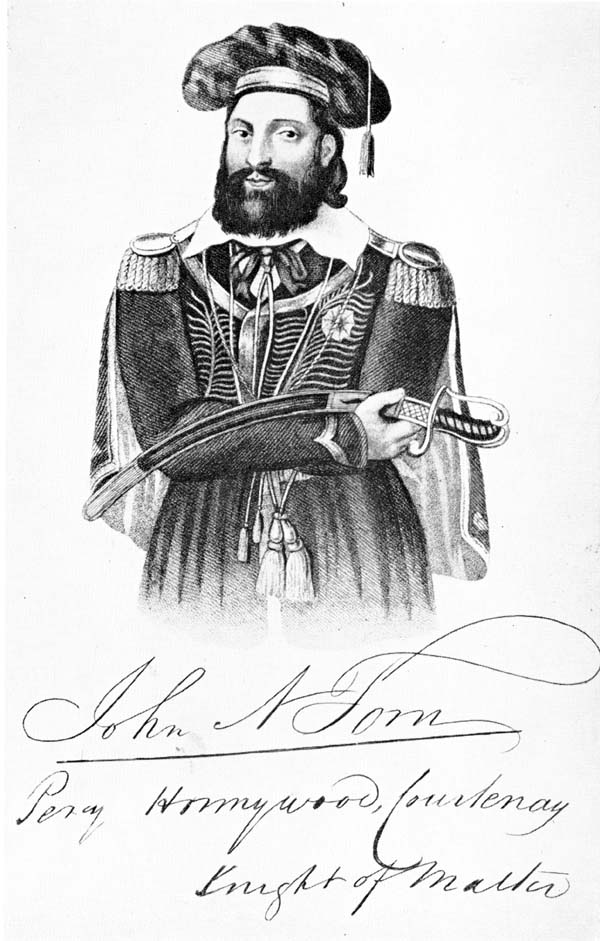
John Nichols Thom

John Nichols Tom (sometimes spelt Thom; 1799 – 31 May 1838) was a Cornish merchant and maltster who re-invented himself as Sir William Courtenay, stood for parliament in Canterbury, was convicted of perjury in a smuggling case, spent three years in the Kent County Lunatic Asylum, and, following his release, gathered a small band of followers and paraded in the Kent countryside. He, along with several of his followers, was killed in a confrontation with government soldiers in Bossenden Wood, in what has sometimes been called the last battle to be fought on English soil.

== Early life ==
John Nichols Tom (or Thom) was born the son of innkeepers in 1799 at St Columb Major, Cornwall. He was baptised in the parish church on 10 November 1799. His parents were William and Charity Tom who kept the Joiners' Arms. Tom went to school in Penryn, attending Bellevue Academy (a "Classical and Commercial Academy"). At the age of about fourteen he transferred to the private school in Launceston that was run by Reverend Richard Cope, pastor of the local Congregational Church.

Tom stayed at school until he was eighteen and was then articled to solicitor Mr Paynter of St Columb. He decided, however, against a career in the law and left after three years. After a short spell as an innkeeper in Wadebridge he settled down as a clerk in the firm of Lubbock and Co, wine merchants of Truro, and took over the business when the partners retired, extending it to include malting. In 1821 he married Catherine Fisher Fulpitt, the daughter of a market gardener in Truro. Tom was a tall, strongly built and handsome man, who became well known in Truro for his considerable sporting skill as a cricketer. During a visit to London he joined the Spencean Society.

When Tom was in his late twenties a series of personal disasters struck. His mother Charity was removed to Cornwall Lunatic Asylum in 1827, and she died there. Then, in 1828, his business premises in Pydar Street burnt down. Tom claimed the insurance and was able to rebuild the premises. At the Quarter Sessions held at Bodmin on 15 July 1828, Tom applied successfully for the return of £304 paid in excise duty on malt destroyed in the fire at his malthouse on 17 June 1828. In 1831 Tom received treatment from a surgeon for an "attack of insanity" but recovered sufficiently and the following spring sailed from Truro to Liverpool with a cargo of malt. He wrote to his wife from Liverpool to tell her he had sold the malt and wrote to her again from Birmingham to tell her he was going to France. Nothing more was heard from him until over a year later when his family heard that a man who fitted his description and went by the name of Sir William Courtenay was being held in Maidstone prison.

== Canterbury ==
In September 1832 Thom arrived in Canterbury, dressed in exotic costumes and wearing long hair and a beard. He put up at the Rose Inn at the junction of Rose Lane and the main street and went first by the name of Count Rothschild, and then by the name of Sir William Percy Honeywood Courtenay, Knight of Malta, heir to the Earl of Devon and the Kentish estates of Sir Edward Hales.

Although many people realized he was an imposter he nevertheless became a colourful and popular figure in the town, partly because he frequently made comical and insulting speeches directed at the unpopular mayor and magistrates of the city and the Archbishop of Canterbury. In the December 1832 general election Liberal support in the town was so overwhelmingly strong that the Conservatives decided against fielding any candidates. Stung by jeers about being afraid to stand, some local Conservatives asked Tom to stand as an independent candidate for Canterbury, hoping he would at least inconvenience the Liberals. He polled a creditable 375 votes (against 834 for Richard Watson and 802 for Viscount Fordwich, the Liberal candidates). He then decided to stand in the East Kent election but polled only a derisory three votes, including his own, and thereafter turned his attention to publishing a weekly paper, The Lion. Eight issues of the paper were produced. Full of biblical quotations, it argued for the rights of the poor, expressed loyalty to the Crown, and was critical of the clergy, aristocracy, town corporations and Parliament. Tom's biographer described the views expressed in The Lion as showing "amazing common sense... far in advance of those generally held in his time", for example, regarding rents, taxation, the Irish problem, and corporal punishment, although he concedes that these "occasional shafts of light" were surrounded by "turgid nonsense".

== Barming Heath ==
At the beginning of March 1833, Thom intervened in the case of some Faversham smugglers, acting as a witness for the defence. The smugglers were nevertheless convicted, and Tom himself was prosecuted for perjury. His trial took place on 25 July at the Kent Summer Assizes at Maidstone before Mr Justice Parke and a crowded court. Evidence was heard from the Vicar of Boughton-under-Blean that Tom had actually been at church at the time he claimed to have witnessed events off the Goodwin Sands. In spite of the testimony of a number of character witnesses, the jury returned a verdict of guilty and Tom was sentenced to three months imprisonment and seven years transportation to Australia.

Tom's family in Truro had heard about the trial and Catherine Tom arrived in Maidstone in August to see if Courtenay was indeed her missing husband. He was produced by the governor of Maidstone Gaol and she made a positive identification. Although Tom always denied any connection with the Truro family, Catherine Tom was believed. She told the authorities about her husband's previous attack of insanity; he was then examined by two surgeons who declared him of unsound mind. Tom was subsequently transferred to Barming Heath Asylum on 28 October 1833.

Tom was a model patient in the asylum, and in early 1837 the superintendent suggested to Catherine Tom that she should petition the Home Secretary for her husband's release. Tom's father in Truro brought his son's case to the attention of Sir Hussey Vivian, the Liberal candidate for East Cornwall in the August 1837 election. Vivian, after his election, took the matter up with the Home Secretary, Lord John Russell, and Tom was granted a free pardon by Queen Victoria, on the condition he was returned into the care of his family in Cornwall. Tom was still refusing to acknowledge any association to the Cornish family and, instead of returning to Cornwall, he went to live with a local farmer and supporter, Mr Francis of Fairbrook, Boughton-under-Blean, who had offered to be his guardian. This was permitted, due to some ambiguous wording on the pardon, and in October 1837, four years after his admission to the asylum, Tom was released.

== Battle and death ==
1840 engraving of the Battle of Bossenden Wood

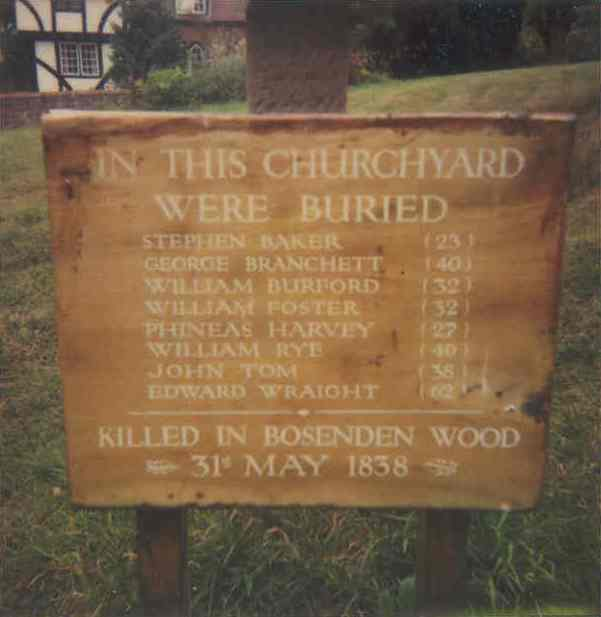
Plaque in Hernhill commermorating Thom and his followers who died at Bossenden Wood

By January 1838, Tom had fallen out with Mr Francis, and he spent the next few months riding through East Kent, relying on the hospitality of supporters. With promises of a better future, fairer distribution of wealth and greater equality, he attracted a following of agricultural labourers, artisans and small-holders. In particular, he addressed their concerns about low wages, lack of work, and the New Poor Law, which ordered all able-bodied men to workhouses if they could not find work. Until the end of May, the activities of Tom and his small band of followers were entirely peaceful as they marched around the local countryside trying to drum up support amongst the workers. Some wealthier landowners were however becoming alarmed and, on 31 May 1838, a local magistrate, Dr Poore, issued a warrant for Tom's arrest for inciting workmen to leave their work.

Early on the morning of 31 May, the parish constable of Boughton-under-Blean enlisted the help of his assistant and also of his brother, Nicholas Mears, and set off to find Tom. When they arrived at Bossenden Farm, where Tom and his followers were staying, Tom shot and killed Nicholas Mears. The constable and his assistant fled. News of the murder reached the magistrates and soldiers were called out from the barracks at Canterbury. A detachment of the 45th Infantry under Major Armstrong, with three junior officers and about one hundred men, met up with the magistrates and tracked Tom and his followers down to a clearing in Bossenden Wood. Tom's followers numbered between thirty and forty (a few had managed to escape after the killing of the constable), and, with the exception of Tom and one other who had pistols, were armed only with sticks. As the soldiers advanced, Lieutenant Bennet was shot dead by Tom. In the ensuing confrontation, which lasted only a few minutes, Tom and eight of his followers were killed or mortally wounded by the soldiers, and a young special constable who was helping the soldiers was caught in their fire and killed. One soldier was slightly injured by a stick.

== Aftermath and legacy ==
Tom's body, together with those of his followers who had been killed, was taken to the Red Lion Inn at Dunkirk. The inn was besieged by souvenir and relic hunters, and the simply curious. The landlord of Red Lion claimed 20,000 people had visited the neighbourhood over the next few days. Tom's biographer describes public feeling:

"This was an insignificant casualty list as battles go; but it was a terrible price to pay for the capture, dead, of one man. When the disastrous results of the affray became known, public opinion was deeply shocked at what seemed an unnecessary loss of life. The repercussions of the Battle of Bossenden wood were soon, in fact, to reach Westminster itself."

An inquest was held at the White Horse, Boughton, the Saturday after the battle, with the jury returning a verdict of "justifiable homicide" on the deaths of Tom and his followers. On the following Tuesday Tom was buried in Hernhill churchyard.

Few of Tom's followers had been arrested at the scene of the battle, but some were picked up over the next few days. Thirty men and two women were arrested, and of these ten were tried for murder — two for the murder of the constable's brother and nine for the murder of Bennett (with Thomas Mears being charged with both). Thomas Mears and William Price were convicted of the murder of the constable's brother, then the rest pleaded guilty. Thomas Mears and William Wills were transported for life, William Price for ten years, and the others received one year's imprisonment.

Local magistrates and politicians, especially Lord John Russell, were attacked for their role in the affair. There were accusations that Sir Hussey Vivian had requested Tom's release in return for his father's vote. A parliamentary select committee was appointed and sat for three days in June. Barrister Frederick Liardet was sent to survey the area for the Central Society of Education, and a school and a church were built in Dunkirk. Journalists talked of the ignorance and moral degradation of the area. Feargus O'Connor suggested a monument should be erected in memory of Courtenay's followers.

== See also ==
- List of people who have claimed to be Jesus

== Bibliography ==
- B Reay 1990 The last rising of the agricultural labourers: rural life and protest in nineteenth-century England. Oxford: Clarendon Press ISBN 0-19-820187-7 (1 October 1990), ISBN 978-0-9564827-2-3 (Breviary Stuff Publications, 31 July 2010).
- PG Rogers 1961 Battle in Bossenden Wood: the strange story of Sir William Courtenay. London: Oxford University Press
