= Battle of Bossenden Wood =

1838 labour riot in Kent, England

Coordinates: 51°18′0″N 0°59′25″E

1840 engraving of the battle

The Battle of Bossenden Wood took place on 31 May 1838 near Hernhill in Kent; it has been called the last battle on English soil. The battle was fought between a small group of labourers from the Hernhill, Dunkirk and Boughton area and a detachment of soldiers sent from Canterbury to arrest the marchers' leader, the self-styled Sir William Courtenay, who was actually John Nichols Tom, a Truro maltster who had spent four years in Kent County Lunatic Asylum. Eleven men died in the brief confrontation: Courtenay, eight of his followers and two of those sent to apprehend them. The background context of the battle was the impact of new Poor Law and it has been linked with the Swing riots.

== Background ==
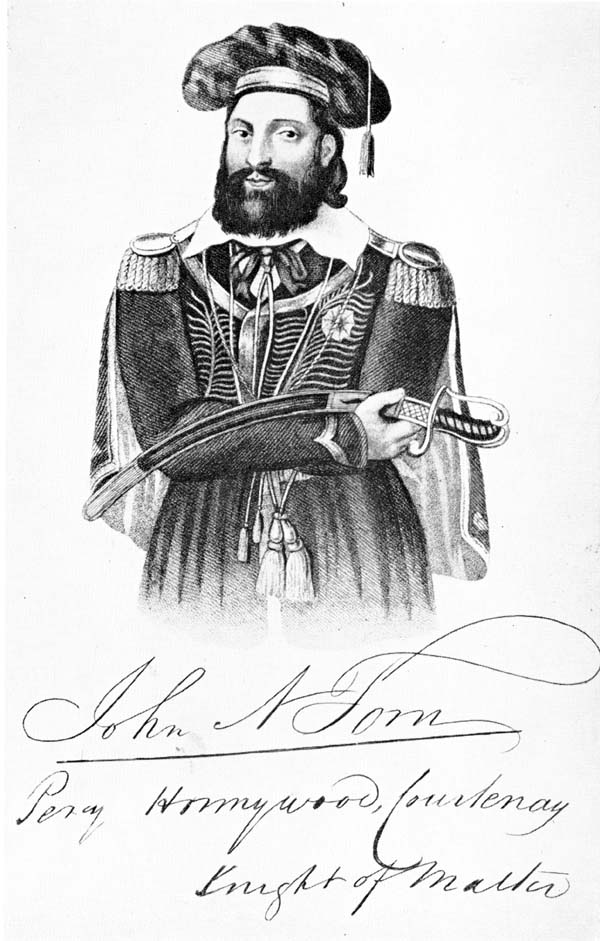
Courtenay

Courtenay had appeared in Canterbury in 1832, standing unsuccessfully in the December 1832 general election and, although suspected of being an imposter, becoming a popular local figure. He had been convicted of perjury in 1833 after giving evidence in defence of some smugglers. Originally sentenced to transportation, he had been transferred to Barming Heath Asylum after a woman from Cornwall, Catherine Tom, identified him as her missing husband and said he had previously been treated for insanity. On his release from the asylum in October 1837, instead of returning to his family in Cornwall, he stayed in Kent and built up a following in the area of Boughton under Blean, Hernhill and the Ville of Dunkirk. The area had already experienced agrarian discontent and protest against the New Poor Law of 1834 and the farm labourers, and a few of the smallholders and trades people, were receptive to Courtenay’s millenarian preaching and promises of a better life.

On 29 May, Oak Apple Day, Courtenay and a band of followers began to march around the nearby countryside with a flag and a loaf of bread on a pole (a traditional symbol of protest). Courtenay rode a grey horse; his followers were on foot. Although at this stage the protesters were acting peacefully, some wealthier landowners were becoming alarmed, and on 31 May 1838, a local magistrate, Dr Poore, issued a warrant for Tom's arrest. It is not clear exactly what the warrant was for – to arrest Courtenay or to arrest workers who were in breach of contract with their employers. A parish constable, John Mears, together with his brother, Nicholas Mears, and an assistant, Daniel Edwards, went to find Courtenay at Bossenden Farm, where he was staying with his followers. Courtenay shot and killed Nicholas Mears, the constable's brother.

== Battle ==
When news of the killing reached the magistrates, they sent to Canterbury for soldiers and a detachment of the 45th Foot was despatched from the barracks. It was led by Major Armstrong, with three junior officers and about a hundred soldiers. The regiment had recently returned from India, and the following year they would kill twenty Chartists at Newport in south Wales. While they were waiting for the soldiers, a group of armed gentry and farmers took shots at Courtenay and his band as they moved around the Hernhill area. By this time some of Courtenay's followers had escaped. There were about 35 or 40 left, armed only with sticks, except for Courtenay who had pistols and a sword, and one follower who had a pistol.

The soldiers split into two groups to execute a pincer movement. One of the groups, led by Captain Reid and magistrates Knatchbull and Baldock, divided again, with Lieutenant Henry Boswell Bennett at the head of one of the small groups. It was this group that approached Courtenay’s band in the clearing, while the other group, under Major Armstrong and magistrate Poore, circled round to the far side of the clearing. There was a brief fight, lasting only a few minutes. Courtenay shot Bennett dead and then was himself shot and killed as Armstrong’s men opened fire and charged with bayonets. Eight of Courtenay's followers were killed or mortally wounded. A young man from Faversham, George Catt, who had been helping the magistrates, was caught in the soldiers' fire and killed.

== Aftermath ==
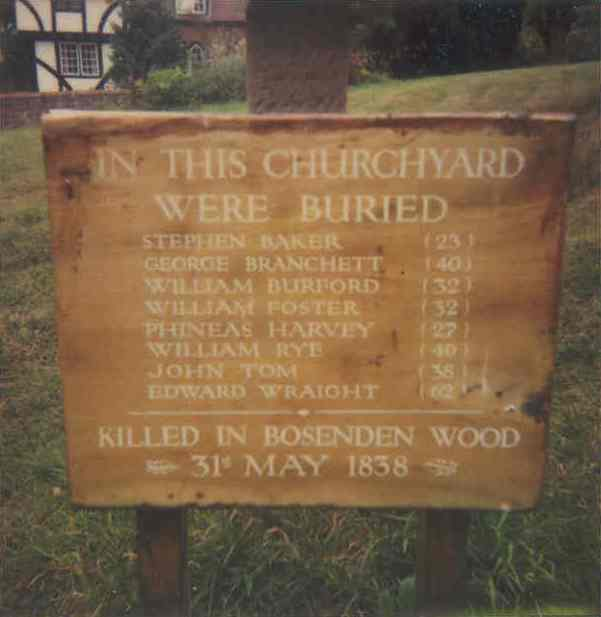
A list of rioters killed in the Battle of Bosenden and buried in Hernhill churchyard. Courtenay is listed as John Tom.

On Saturday 2 June, Lieutenant Bennett was buried in Canterbury Cathedral precincts with full military honours. On the same day an inquest at the White Horse, Boughton, returned a verdict of "justifiable homicide" on the deaths of Courtenay and his followers. Those who were following Courtenay and were killed were: Stephen Baker (22), William Foster (33), William Rye (46), Edward Wraight (62), Phineas Harvey (27), William Burford (33), George Griggs (23), and George Branchett (49). Griggs and Branchett were buried in Boughton churchyard; all the rest, including Courtenay, were buried in Hernhill churchyard.

Over the following days about thirty of Courtenay’s followers were arrested and appeared either at the inquest or at the petty sessions in Faversham. Sixteen were committed for trial on a charge of murder. Ten men would eventually stand trial at Maidstone Assizes in early August, the rest having been discharged by the assize grand jury. Two (Thomas Mears and William Price) were charged with the murder of the brother of the constable and nine (Thomas Mears, Edward Curling, Alexander Foad, William Foad, Richard Foreman, Thomas Griggs, Charles Hills, Edward Wraight, and William Wills) with the murder of Lieutenant Bennett, with one, Thomas Mears, charged with both murders.

Thomas Mears and William Price stood trial first. The jury returned a guilty verdict, with a recommendation for mercy. The judge, Lord Denman, duly pronounced sentence of death but immediately told the men that the sentence would not be carried out. Seeing this result, the nine charged with the murder of Lieutenant Bennett pleaded guilty; they too were sentenced to death but immediately reprieved. Thomas Mears and William Wills were sentenced to be transported to Australia for life, William Price for ten years, and the rest were sentenced to a prison term of one year.

== Bibliography ==
- B Reay 1990 The last rising of the agricultural labourers: rural life and protest in nineteenth-century England. Oxford: Clarendon Press ISBN 0-19-820187-7 (1 October 1990), ISBN 978-0-9564827-2-3 (Breviary Stuff Publications, 31 July 2010).
- PG Rogers 1961 Battle in Bossenden Wood: the strange story of Sir William Courtenay. London: Oxford University Press
