= Charles Whittaker (cricketer) =

English cricketer

Charles Gustavus Whittaker (8 September 1819 – 15 November 1886) was an English first-class cricketer active 1839–48 who played for Kent. He was born and died in Barming, Kent. He played in 70 first-class matches as a right-handed batsman, scoring 844 runs with a highest score of 55; and as a right-arm roundarm fast bowler, taking 46 wickets with a best performance of six for (unknown).

== Bibliography ==
- Carlaw, Derek (2020). Kent County Cricketers, A to Z: Part One (1806–1914) (PDF). Cardiff: ACS.
