= Barming =

Civil parish in Kent, England

Coordinates: 51.263420°N 0.470560°E

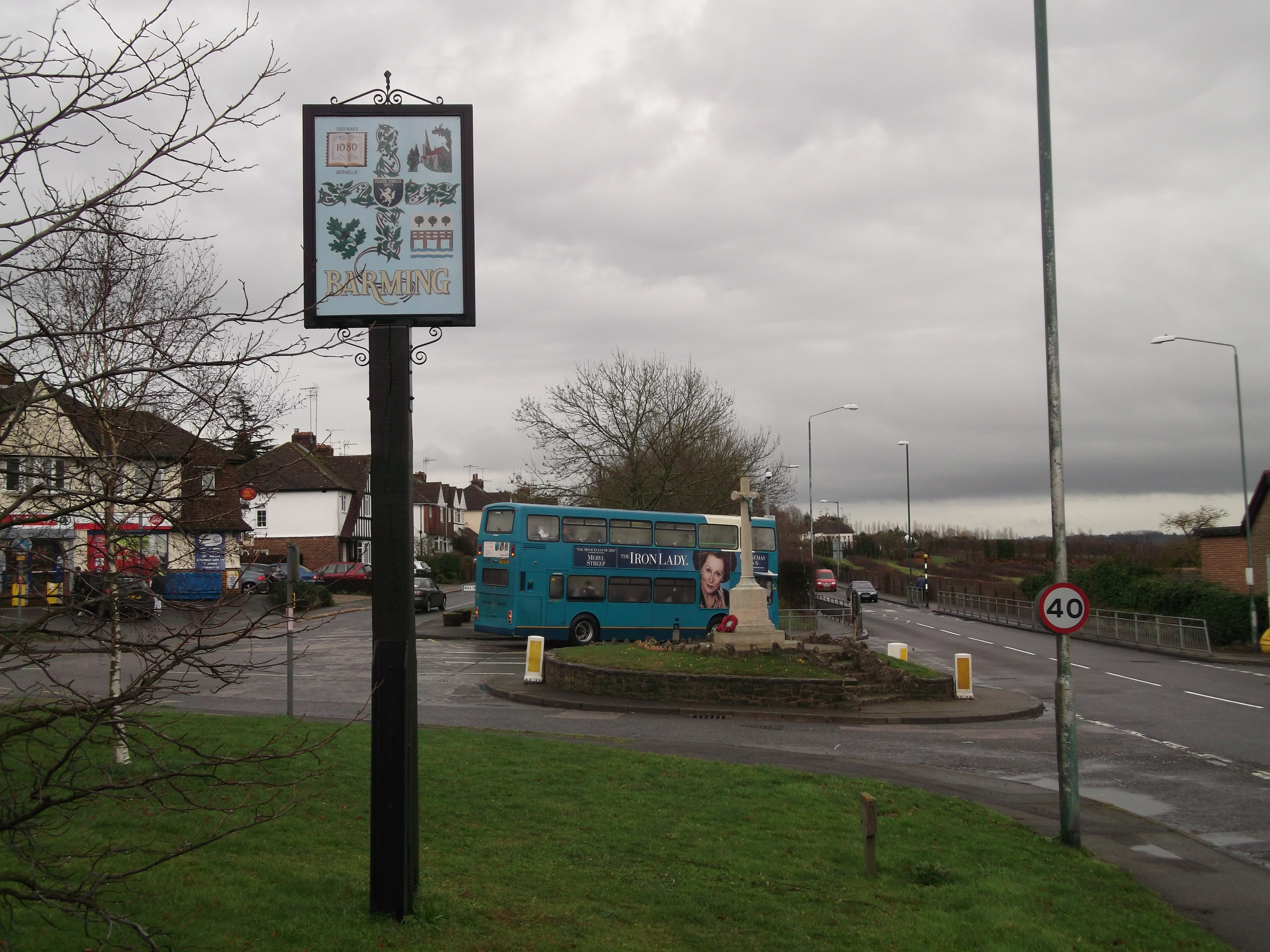

- Location within Kent
- Population: 2,690 (2011)
- OS grid reference: TQ728568
- District: Maidstone
- Shire county: Kent
- Region: South East
- Country: England
- Sovereign state: United Kingdom
- Post town: MAIDSTONE
- Postcode district: ME16
- Police: Kent
- Fire: Kent
- Ambulance: South East Coast
- UK Parliament: Maidstone and Malling

Barming is a civil parish in the Maidstone District of Kent, England. It lies to the west of Maidstone and at the 2011 census had a population of 2,690. The eastern end of the parish is part of the built-up area of Maidstone, although the remainder is much more rural. The River Medway forms its southern boundary.

Barming is mentioned in the Domesday Book, and was then described as being divided into East and West; the latter being known as Little Barming, and having its own church until the 16th century.

Barming Primary School dates back to 1854 but is no longer located on its original site. The area has undergone increased residential development in recent years due to its proximity to both Maidstone Hospital and the Maidstone East rail line to central London.

The area has also suffered from significant disruption caused by sinkholes in the late 2010s, including the closure of the A26 road in the summer of 2018 as the road was repaired.

== Transport ==
Barming railway station, on the Maidstone East line, was opened on 1 June 1874 but is not actually located in the district. It lies a mile to the north and is in the neighbouring borough of Tonbridge & Malling.

The railway station named East Farleigh lies in Barming parish, at the extreme southern boundary adjacent to the River Medway. This is on the Medway Valley Line linking Strood, Maidstone and Paddock Wood.

The A26 road crosses the parish. Local bus services are provided by Arriva Southern Counties and Nu-Venture.

== St. Margaret's Church ==
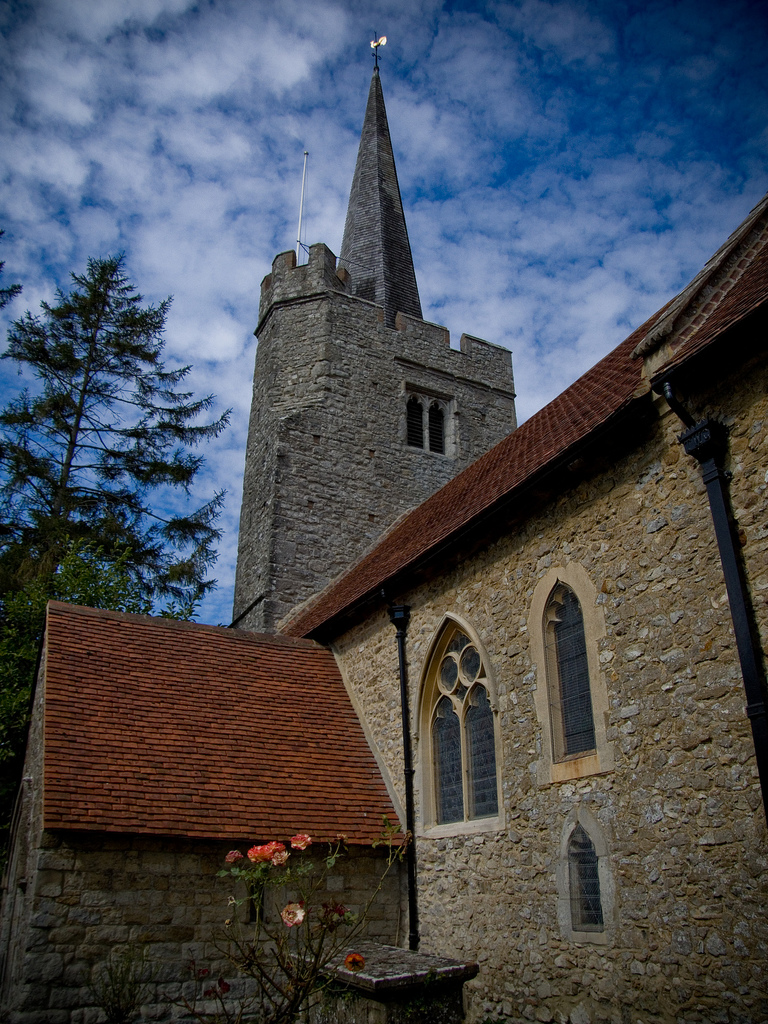
Saint Margaret's Church

Surrounded by fields, the church was built in the Norman period (12th Century) and has a characteristic triangle of east windows and a tower in the perpendicular style has been added. The Church is Grade II* listed and some of the gravestones are Grade I. Amongst many items that you can see are three bench ends made in Germany in 1300. In the churchyard is a mounting block – four stone steps built in the 19th century to help riders to mount their horses.

== Culture ==
At 7.15 p.m. on 1 May each year, local Morris dancers Kettle Bridge Clogs used to dance across Barming Bridge (otherwise known as the Kettle Bridge) which spans the River Medway at the southern end of South Street. The event marked the official start of their Morris dancing season. The tradition has not been followed in recent years.

In and around Barming (as well as much of the UK), it is believed that the word "barming" or "barmy" (meaning mad or crazy) were named after the village of Barming due to the location of the County of Kent's psychiatric hospital being in Barming. Whilst this story is generally understood to be apocryphal, many still consider it true.

== Notable people ==
- Mark Noble (1754–1827), Rector of Barming and author
- Gilbert Elliot (1800–1891), Rector of Barming
- Charles Whittaker (1819–1886), cricketer, born and lived here
- Robinson Ellis (1834–1913), scholar, born here
- David Clark (1919–2013), cricketer, born here
- Fred Ridgway (1923–2015), Kent and England cricketer, lived here

== See also ==
- East Barming
- Barming Heath
- Listed buildings in Barming
