= Barming Heath =

Area of Maidstone, Kent, England

Coordinates: 51.26°N 00.46°E

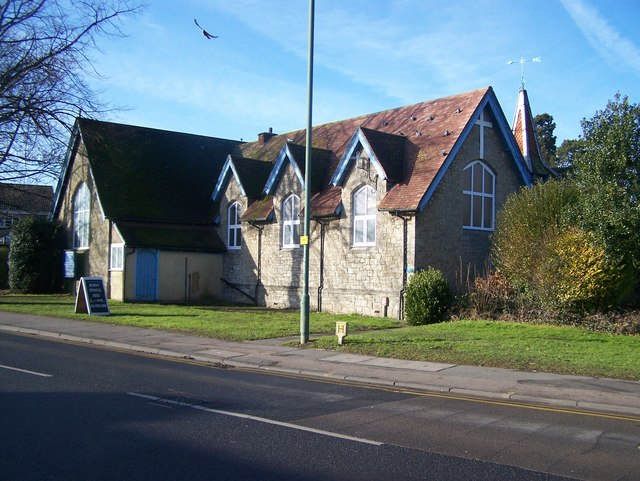
- Parish Church of St Andrew

- Location within Kent
- OS grid reference: TQ7255
- Shire county: Kent
- Region: South East
- Country: England
- Sovereign state: United Kingdom
- Post town: Maidstone
- Postcode district: ME16
- Police: Kent
- Fire: Kent
- Ambulance: South East Coast
- UK Parliament: Maidstone and Malling

Barming Heath is an area of western Maidstone in Kent, England. Its parish church is dedicated to St Andrew.

== See also ==
- Barming
- East Barming
- Oakwood Hospital
