= Listed buildings in Dunkirk, Kent =

Historic structures in Kent, England

Dunkirk is a village and civil parish in the Swale District of Kent, England. It contains 10 grade II listed buildings that are recorded in the National Heritage List for England.

This list is based on the information retrieved online from Historic England.

== Key ==
Grade	Criteria
I	Buildings that are of exceptional interest
II*	Particularly important buildings of more than special interest
II	Buildings that are of special interest

== Listing ==
Name	Grade	Location	Type	Completed (Note: The date given is the date used by Historic England as significant for the initial building or that of an important part in the structure's description.)	Date designated	Grid ref. (Note: The grid reference is based on the British national grid reference system, sometimes known as OSGB36, used by the Ordnance Survey.) Geo-coordinates	Notes	Entry number (Note: The "List Entry Number" is a unique number assigned to each listed building and scheduled monument by Historic England.)	Image	Wikidata
Bofors Tower Approximately 500 Metres North North West of Christ Church	II	Approximately 500 Metres North North West Of Christ Church			6 August 2002	TR0728659382; 51°17′45″N 0°58′19″E		1088075	Upload Photo	Q26380461
Dunkirk Parish War Memorial	II				6 April 2017	TR0746758927; 51°17′30″N 0°58′27″E		1444723	Upload Photo	Q66478661
Dunkirk Radar Tower	II				12 September 2002	TR0781059059; 51°17′34″N 0°58′45″E		1031910	Upload Photo	Q26283305
Tower at 076606	II				21 May 1986	TR0765460603; 51°18′24″N 0°58′40″E		1107173	Upload Photo	Q26400984
Christ Church	II	Boughton Hill	church building		24 January 1967	TR0748758909; 51°17′29″N 0°58′28″E		1344004	Christ Church More images	Q26627760
The Old Vicarage	II	Boughton Hill			21 May 1986	TR0741458846; 51°17′27″N 0°58′24″E		1107927	Upload Photo	Q26401716
Little Chef	II	Canterbury Road			31 July 1979	TR0898058744; 51°17′22″N 0°59′45″E		1069141	Upload Photo	Q26321873
Bossenden Farmhouse	II	London Road			21 May 1986	TR0882959657; 51°17′52″N 0°59′39″E		1069142	Upload Photo	Q26321875
Dunkirk Primary School	II	London Road			21 May 1986	TR0753958976; 51°17′31″N 0°58′31″E		1107903	Upload Photo	Q26401691
Jull Cottage	II	Rhode Common			21 May 1986	TR0609856526; 51°16′14″N 0°57′11″E		1325202	Upload Photo	Q26610780

== See also ==
- Grade I listed buildings in Kent
- Grade II* listed buildings in Kent

== Sources ==
- Newman, John (2013) [1969], Kent: North-East and East, The Buildings of England, New Haven and London: Yale University Press, ISBN 978-0-300-18506-5
