= Listed buildings in Hernhill =

Historic structures in Kent, England

Hernhill is a village and civil parish in the Swale District of Kent, England. It contains 39 listed buildings that are recorded in the National Heritage List for England. Of these one is grade I, two are grade II* and 36 are grade II.

This list is based on the information retrieved online from Historic England.

== Key ==
| Grade | Criteria |
|---|---|
| I | Buildings that are of exceptional interest |
| II* | Particularly important buildings of more than special interest |
| II | Buildings that are of special interest |

== Listing ==
| Name | Grade | Location | Type | Completed (Note: The date given is the date used by Historic England as significant for the initial building or that of an important part in the structure's description.) | Date designated | Grid ref. (Note: The grid reference is based on the British national grid reference system, sometimes known as OSGB36, used by the Ordnance Survey.) Geo-coordinates | Notes | Entry number (Note: The "List Entry Number" is a unique number assigned to each listed building and scheduled monument by Historic England.) | Image | Wikidata |
|---|---|---|---|---|---|---|---|---|---|---|
| K6 Kiosk | II | Church Hill | | | 14 April 1994 | TR0653660807; 51°18′32″N 0°57′43″E | | 1270400 | Upload Photo | Q26560458 |
| Bushey Wilds | II | Dargate | | | 21 May 1986 | TR0800961372; 51°18′48″N 0°59′00″E | | 1069111 | Upload Photo | Q26321824 |
| Dargate House | II* | Dargate | | | 24 January 1967 | TR0751861941; 51°19′07″N 0°58′36″E | | 1344025 | Upload Photo | Q17546552 |
| Elm Tree Cottage | II | Dargate | | | 21 May 1986 | TR0806061404; 51°18′49″N 0°59′03″E | | 1069112 | Upload Photo | Q26321826 |
| Fairbrook | II | Fairbrook | | | 21 May 1986 | TR0502460695; 51°18′30″N 0°56′25″E | | 1120799 | Upload Photo | Q26414007 |
| Fairbrook Cottage | II | Fairbrook | | | 21 May 1986 | TR0497860619; 51°18′28″N 0°56′22″E | | 1344026 | Upload Photo | Q26627780 |
| Oast Cottage | II | Fairbrook | | | 21 May 1986 | TR0512760786; 51°18′33″N 0°56′30″E | | 1069113 | Upload Photo | Q26321828 |
| Bessborough Farmhouse | II | Fostall | | | 24 January 1967 | TR0669561492; 51°18′54″N 0°57′53″E | | 1120781 | Upload Photo | Q26413990 |
| The Fostall | II | 1-2, Fostall | | | 21 May 1986 | TR0659861469; 51°18′53″N 0°57′47″E | | 1344027 | Upload Photo | Q26627781 |
| 5 Headstones About 15 Metres South East of West Tower of St Michael | II | Hernhill Green | | | 21 May 1986 | TR0648360662; 51°18′27″N 0°57′40″E | | 1344029 | Upload Photo | Q26627783 |
| Church of St Michael | I | Hernhill Green | church building | | 24 January 1967 | TR0649160680; 51°18′28″N 0°57′40″E | | 1069116 | Church of St Michael More images | Q17530029 |
| Dale Farmhouse | II | Hernhill Green | | | 21 May 1986 | TR0651960786; 51°18′31″N 0°57′42″E | | 1121126 | Upload Photo | Q26414308 |
| Hand Pump 5 Metres North of Hernhill Manor | II | Hernhill Green | | | 21 May 1986 | TR0654760699; 51°18′28″N 0°57′43″E | | 1069114 | Upload Photo | Q26321829 |
| Manor House | II* | Hernhill Green | house | | 24 January 1967 | TR0653860684; 51°18′28″N 0°57′43″E | | 1323023 | Manor House More images | Q17546460 |
| Michael's Cottages | II | 1-4, Hernhill Green | | | 27 August 1952 | TR0653660723; 51°18′29″N 0°57′43″E | | 1121152 | Upload Photo | Q26414334 |
| Red Lion | II | Hernhill Green | | | 27 August 1952 | TR0652660756; 51°18′30″N 0°57′42″E | | 1069115 | Upload Photo | Q26321831 |
| Walnut Tree House | II | Hernhill Green | | | 21 May 1986 | TR0656060805; 51°18′32″N 0°57′44″E | | 1344028 | Upload Photo | Q26627782 |
| Meadow Farmhouse | II | High Street | | | 21 May 1986 | TR0743662678; 51°19′31″N 0°58′33″E | | 1069117 | Upload Photo | Q26321833 |
| The Old Farmhouse Lamberhurst | II | High Street | | | 21 May 1986 | TR0874462194; 51°19′14″N 0°59′40″E | | 1121553 | Upload Photo | Q26414716 |
| Post Office Stores and No 2 Post Office Cottages | II | Plum Pudding Lane | | | 4 May 1976 | TR0787961737; 51°19′00″N 0°58′54″E | | 1122677 | Upload Photo | Q26415794 |
| Memorial and Railings to the Hill, Squire and Grove Families, About 20 Metres South West of Church of St Michael | II | Hernhill Green | | | 21 May 1986 | TR0646160662; 51°18′27″N 0°57′39″E | | 1121545 | Upload Photo | Q26414709 |
| Forge Farmhouse | II | Staple Street | | | 21 May 1986 | TR0596360138; 51°18′11″N 0°57′12″E | | 1069119 | Upload Photo | Q26321835 |
| Gates to Mount Ephraim at 063599 | II | Staple Street | | | 21 May 1986 | TR0631859962; 51°18′05″N 0°57′30″E | | 1122657 | Upload Photo | Q26415776 |
| Ha-ha About 50 Metres East of Mount Ephraim | II | Staple Street | | | 21 May 1986 | TR0648559887; 51°18′02″N 0°57′38″E | | 1122664 | Upload Photo | Q26415781 |
| Holly House | II | Staple Street | | | 24 January 1967 | TR0595760115; 51°18′10″N 0°57′12″E | | 1344031 | Upload Photo | Q26627785 |
| Holly Tree Cottage | II | Staple Street | | | 24 January 1967 | TR0596960090; 51°18′10″N 0°57′12″E | | 1338185 | Upload Photo | Q26622533 |
| Homestead | II | Staple Street | | | 21 May 1986 | TR0602960078; 51°18′09″N 0°57′15″E | | 1343994 | Upload Photo | Q26627751 |
| K6 Telephone Kiosk | II | Staple Street | | | 8 October 1989 | TR0597360106; 51°18′10″N 0°57′12″E | | 1262904 | Upload Photo | Q26553744 |
| Mount Ephraim | II | Staple Street | | | 21 May 1986 | TR0641359960; 51°18′05″N 0°57′35″E | | 1069118 | Upload Photo | Q99662707 |
| Mount Farm Oast | II | Staple Street | | | 21 May 1986 | TR0612260030; 51°18′07″N 0°57′20″E | | 1069121 | Upload Photo | Q26321840 |
| Mount Farmhouse | II | Staple Street | | | 24 January 1967 | TR0609260043; 51°18′08″N 0°57′18″E | | 1122670 | Upload Photo | Q26415787 |
| Mountfield | II | Staple Street | | | 21 May 1986 | TR0621959956; 51°18′05″N 0°57′25″E | | 1122642 | Upload Photo | Q26415763 |
| The Bothy | II | Staple Street | | | 21 May 1986 | TR0591060091; 51°18′10″N 0°57′09″E | | 1069120 | Upload Photo | Q26321838 |
| The Orchard | II | Staple Street | | | 24 January 1967 | TR0671759553; 51°17′51″N 0°57′50″E | | 1344030 | Upload Photo | Q26627784 |
| Three Horse Shoes | II | Staple Street | | | 21 May 1986 | TR0598660102; 51°18′10″N 0°57′13″E | | 1122668 | Upload Photo | Q26415785 |
| Waterham Farmhouse | II | Waterham | | | 24 January 1967 | TR0705762623; 51°19′30″N 0°58′14″E | | 1338179 | Upload Photo | Q26622527 |
| Lavender Cottages | II | 1, 2 and 3, Waterham Road | | | 19 July 1984 | TR0701061844; 51°19′05″N 0°58′10″E | | 1069122 | Upload Photo | Q26321842 |
| Brook Hall | II | Wey Street | | | 24 January 1967 | TR0727362104; 51°19′13″N 0°58′24″E | | 1069123 | Upload Photo | Q26321844 |
| Way Street Farmhouse | II | Wey Street | | | 21 May 1986 | TR0594061569; 51°18′57″N 0°57′14″E | | 1069124 | Upload Photo | Q26321845 |

== See also ==
- Grade I listed buildings in Kent
- Grade II* listed buildings in Kent

== Sources ==
- Newman, John (2013) [1969], Kent: North-East and East, The Buildings of England, New Haven and London: Yale University Press, ISBN 978-0-300-18506-5
