= Listed buildings in Boughton under Blean =

Civil Parish in Kent, England

Boughton under Blean is a village and civil parish in the Swale District of Kent, England. It contains 89 listed buildings that are recorded in the National Heritage List for England. Of these one is grade I, six are grade II* and 82 are grade II.

This list is based on the information retrieved online from Historic England.

== Key ==
Grade	Criteria
I	Buildings that are of exceptional interest
II*	Particularly important buildings of more than special interest
II	Buildings that are of special interest

== Listing ==
Name	Grade	Location	Type	Completed (Note: The date given is the date used by Historic England as significant for the initial building or that of an important part in the structure's description.)	Date designated	Grid ref. (Note: The grid reference is based on the British national grid reference system, sometimes known as OSGB36, used by the Ordnance Survey.) Geo-coordinates	Notes	Entry number (Note: The "List Entry Number" is a unique number assigned to each listed building and scheduled monument by Historic England.)	Image	Wikidata
Walled Gardens to North of Brenley Farmhouse	II				21 May 1986	TR0379959085; 51°17′40″N 0°55′18″E		1069169	Upload Photo	Q26321926
The George Inn	II	Bkoughton Street			21 May 1986	TR0576059422; 51°17′48″N 0°57′00″E		1069162	Upload Photo	Q26321912
108 and 110	II	108 and 110, Boughton Street			21 May 1986	TR0612759300; 51°17′44″N 0°57′19″E		1104884	Upload Photo	Q26398848
118 and 120, Boughton Street	II	118 and 120, Boughton Street			21 May 1986	TR0607459324; 51°17′45″N 0°57′16″E		1069167	Upload Photo	Q26321922
119, 121 and 123	II	119, 121 and 123, Boughton Street			21 May 1986	TR0585459374; 51°17′47″N 0°57′05″E		1344007	Upload Photo	Q26627763
127-133, Boughton Street	II	127-133, Boughton Street			21 May 1986	TR0582259385; 51°17′47″N 0°57′03″E		1344008	Upload Photo	Q26627764
128 and 130	II	128 and 130, Boughton Street			21 May 1986	TR0603159340; 51°17′45″N 0°57′14″E		1069166	Upload Photo	Q26321920
132 and 134	II	132 and 134, Boughton Street			21 May 1986	TR0602359343; 51°17′45″N 0°57′13″E		1326680	Upload Photo	Q26612144
151	II	151, Boughton Street			24 January 1967	TR0576859396; 51°17′47″N 0°57′00″E		1344009	Upload Photo	Q26627765
152 and 154, Boughton Street	II	152 and 154, Boughton Street			21 May 1986	TR0588359389; 51°17′47″N 0°57′06″E		1096861	Upload Photo	Q26389124
167 and 169	II	167 and 169, Boughton Street			21 May 1986	TR0569559417; 51°17′48″N 0°56′57″E		1087045	Upload Photo	Q26379529
184, Boughton Street	II	184, Boughton Street			21 May 1986	TR0578859421; 51°17′48″N 0°57′01″E		1069163	Upload Photo	Q26321914
186 and 188, Boughton Street	II	186 and 188, Boughton Street			24 January 1967	TR0577459421; 51°17′48″N 0°57′01″E		1096854	Upload Photo	Q26389118
187, 189 and 191	II	187, 189 and 191, Boughton Street			21 May 1986	TR0561359440; 51°17′49″N 0°56′52″E		1335850	Upload Photo	Q26620406
193	II	193, Boughton Street			21 May 1986	TR0559859448; 51°17′49″N 0°56′52″E		1344011	Upload Photo	Q26627767
197 and 199	II	197 and 199, Boughton Street			24 January 1967	TR0558559449; 51°17′49″N 0°56′51″E		1087025	Upload Photo	Q26379512
204-212	II	204-212, Boughton Street			10 January 1984	TR0571159439; 51°17′49″N 0°56′58″E		1343976	Upload Photo	Q26627736
213	II	213, Boughton Street			24 January 1967	TR0547859520; 51°17′52″N 0°56′46″E		1087013	Upload Photo	Q26379503
214	II	214, Boughton Street			24 January 1967	TR0569259445; 51°17′49″N 0°56′57″E		1096845	Upload Photo	Q26389109
217	II	217, Boughton Street			21 May 1986	TR0547259529; 51°17′52″N 0°56′45″E		1344012	Upload Photo	Q26627768
221	II	221, Boughton Street			24 January 1967	TR0546559534; 51°17′52″N 0°56′45″E		1087015	Upload Photo	Q26379505
233, 235 and 237, Boughton Street	II	233, 235 and 237, Boughton Street			21 May 1986	TR0545059545; 51°17′53″N 0°56′44″E		1069158	Upload Photo	Q26321902
234	II	234, Boughton Street			21 May 1986	TR0560659466; 51°17′50″N 0°56′52″E		1069161	Upload Photo	Q26321909
239	II	239, Boughton Street			24 January 1967	TR0542059550; 51°17′53″N 0°56′43″E		1086971	Upload Photo	Q26379454
240	II	240, Boughton Street			21 May 1986	TR0559059470; 51°17′50″N 0°56′51″E		1334406	Upload Photo	Q26619073
242, Boughton Street	II	242, Boughton Street			21 May 1986	TR0558359472; 51°17′50″N 0°56′51″E		1343975	Upload Photo	Q26627735
258	II	258, Boughton Street			8 August 1985	TR0549559536; 51°17′52″N 0°56′47″E		1335915	Upload Photo	Q26620462
69, Boughton Street	II	69, Boughton Street			24 January 1967	TR0621259252; 51°17′42″N 0°57′23″E		1069186	Upload Photo	Q26321957
71 and 73	II	71 and 73, Boughton Street			24 January 1967	TR0620559249; 51°17′42″N 0°57′23″E		1069187	Upload Photo	Q26321959
75	II	75, Boughton Street			24 January 1967	TR0618359258; 51°17′42″N 0°57′21″E		1069188	Upload Photo	Q26321961
82, 84, 86 and 88	II	82, 84, 86 and 88, Boughton Street			14 December 1977	TR0620359279; 51°17′43″N 0°57′23″E		1069168	Upload Photo	Q26321924
91 and 93	II	91 and 93, Boughton Street			24 January 1967	TR0602659303; 51°17′44″N 0°57′13″E		1344006	Upload Photo	Q26627762
Chestnut House	II	89, Boughton Street			24 January 1967	TR0603959289; 51°17′44″N 0°57′14″E		1344005	Upload Photo	Q26627761
Grove Court with Attached Garden Walls to Left and Right	II	81, Boughton Street			24 January 1967	TR0612259268; 51°17′43″N 0°57′18″E		1069189	Upload Photo	Q26321963
Methodist Chapel	II	Boughton Street			16 March 1977	TR0566359422; 51°17′48″N 0°56′55″E		1069155	Upload Photo	Q26321898
Mortuary Chapel Or Bier House Below Chapel	II	Boughton Street			21 May 1986	TR0605459327; 51°17′45″N 0°57′15″E		1104875	Upload Photo	Q26398841
Oak Lodge	II	161, Boughton Street			24 January 1967	TR0573559402; 51°17′48″N 0°56′59″E		1069154	Upload Photo	Q26321896
Pilgrims	II	262, Boughton Street			21 May 1986	TR0548159543; 51°17′53″N 0°56′46″E		1344013	Upload Photo	Q26627769
Railings 5 Metres to South of Scarbutts	II	Boughton Street			21 May 1986	TR0596059358; 51°17′46″N 0°57′10″E		1069165	Upload Photo	Q26321918
Scarbutts	II	142, Boughton Street			24 January 1967	TR0596759368; 51°17′46″N 0°57′11″E		1069164	Upload Photo	Q26321916
Spar Shop	II	211, Boughton Street			24 January 1967	TR0549159516; 51°17′52″N 0°56′46″E		1069157	Upload Photo	Q26321900
Style House	II*	205, Boughton Street			27 August 1952	TR0554359470; 51°17′50″N 0°56′49″E		1069156	Upload Photo	Q17546228
Tenterden House	II	209, Boughton Street			24 January 1967	TR0550659494; 51°17′51″N 0°56′47″E		1335869	Upload Photo	Q26620420
The Manse and Manse Cottage	II	192 and 194, Boughton Street			21 May 1986	TR0574859422; 51°17′48″N 0°56′59″E		1334368	Upload Photo	Q26619038
The Queens Head	II	Boughton Street			21 May 1986	TR0588759362; 51°17′46″N 0°57′06″E		1069151	Upload Photo	Q26321890
Wall and Railings North and East of Chestnut House	II	Boughton Street			21 May 1986	TR0604559303; 51°17′44″N 0°57′14″E		1069150	Upload Photo	Q26321887
Wall to West and Adjoining Oak Lodge	II	Boughton Street			21 May 1986	TR0571859418; 51°17′48″N 0°56′58″E		1344010	Upload Photo	Q26627766
Wheelwright House	II	149, Boughton Street			24 January 1967	TR0578059395; 51°17′47″N 0°57′01″E		1069152	Upload Photo	Q26321892
White Horse Inn	II	Boughton Street			21 May 1986	TR0556859479; 51°17′50″N 0°56′50″E		1086952	Upload Photo	Q26379386
Barn 30 Metres South of Brenley Farmhouse	II	Brenley			24 January 1967	TR0383158982; 51°17′37″N 0°55′20″E		1326667	Upload Photo	Q26612134
Brenley Farmhouse	II	Brenley			24 January 1967	TR0381059029; 51°17′38″N 0°55′19″E		1326677	Upload Photo	Q26612141
Granary 30 Metres South of Brenley Farmhouse	II	Brenley			9 January 1980	TR0379658977; 51°17′36″N 0°55′18″E		1343977	Upload Photo	Q26627737
Stables, 40 Metres East of Brenley Farmhouse	II	40 Metres East Of Brenley Farmhouse, Brenley			24 January 1967	TR0389459008; 51°17′37″N 0°55′23″E		1343995	Upload Photo	Q26627752
Bramble Hall	II	Bushley Close			24 January 1967	TR0551859119; 51°17′39″N 0°56′47″E		1069128	Upload Photo	Q26321853
Barn and Wall About 100 Metres East of Colkins	II	Clockhouse			24 January 1967	TR0345459220; 51°17′45″N 0°55′01″E		1343998	Upload Photo	Q26627754
Colkins	II*	Clockhouse	house		27 August 1952	TR0336059256; 51°17′46″N 0°54′56″E		1069131	Colkins More images	Q17546211
Walls About 20 to 60 Metres South East of Colkins	II*	Clockhouse			21 May 1986	TR0340159215; 51°17′45″N 0°54′58″E		1069132	Upload Photo	Q17546218
Blean House	II	Colonel's Lane			21 May 1986	TR0621058628; 51°17′22″N 0°57′22″E		1343996	Upload Photo	Q26627753
Thunderhill Cottage	II	Colonel's Lane			21 May 1986	TR0630558746; 51°17′26″N 0°57′27″E		1069129	Upload Photo	Q26321855
Trent Cottage	II	Colonel's Lane			21 May 1986	TR0611258380; 51°17′14″N 0°57′16″E		1069130	Upload Photo	Q26321857
Crouch Hill Cottages	II	Crouch, South Street			21 May 1986	TR0513557972; 51°17′02″N 0°56′25″E		1107203	Upload Photo	Q26401013
157 and 159 the Street	II	157 and 159 The Street, Faversham, ME13 9BH, Boughton Street			24 January 1967	TR0575659399; 51°17′47″N 0°57′00″E		1069153	Upload Photo	Q26321894
248 the Street	II	248 The Street, Faversham, ME13 9AL, Boughton Street			24 January 1967	TR0553459504; 51°17′51″N 0°56′49″E		1069160	Upload Photo	Q26321907
260 the Street	II	260 The Street, Faversham, ME13 9AD, Boughton Street			21 May 1986	TR0548859538; 51°17′52″N 0°56′46″E		1069159	Upload Photo	Q26321904
Raspberry Vale Cottage	II	Horselees Road, Boughton-under-blean, Faversham			24 November 2011	TR0616258216; 51°17′09″N 0°57′18″E		1406200	Upload Photo	Q26675828
Gates and Railings to Nash Court (046597)	II	Nash Court			21 May 1986	TR0463459734; 51°18′00″N 0°56′03″E		1106376	Upload Photo	Q26400244
Nash Court	II*	Nash Court			21 May 1986	TR0470459936; 51°18′06″N 0°56′07″E		1069133	Upload Photo	Q17546223
The Maybolt	II	North Lane			21 May 1986	TR0574758000; 51°17′02″N 0°56′56″E		1343999	Upload Photo	Q26627755
Barn 20 Metres North of Boughton Court	II	South Street			21 May 1986	TR0475658617; 51°17′24″N 0°56′07″E		1069135	Upload Photo	Q26321861
Boughton Church Farmhouse	II	South Street			21 May 1986	TR0488758387; 51°17′16″N 0°56′13″E		1344001	Upload Photo	Q26627757
Boughton Court	II	South Street			24 January 1967	TR0474758577; 51°17′22″N 0°56′06″E		1106357	Upload Photo	Q26400226
Church of St Peter and St Paul	I	South Street	church building		24 January 1967	TR0478458554; 51°17′21″N 0°56′08″E		1325956	Church of St Peter and St Paul More images	Q17530131
Churchyard Wall to Church of Saint Peter and Saint Paul	II	South Street			24 January 1967	TR0480158582; 51°17′22″N 0°56′09″E		1106304	Upload Photo	Q26400180
Cottages 10 Metres East of Nos 1-6 Church Cottages	II	South Street			21 May 1986	TR0491158352; 51°17′15″N 0°56′14″E		1325966	Upload Photo	Q26611479
Foxhill Cottage	II	South Street, Oversland			21 May 1986	TR0592457422; 51°16′43″N 0°57′04″E		1107188	Upload Photo	Q26400999
Group of Headstones to North and East of Church of St Peter and St Paul	II	South Street			21 May 1986	TR0479858568; 51°17′22″N 0°56′09″E		1069136	Upload Photo	Q26321863
Hall Cottage	II*	South Street	cottage		24 January 1967	TR0559257704; 51°16′53″N 0°56′48″E		1344002	Hall Cottage More images	Q17546542
Murray House	II	South Street			24 January 1967	TR0556857728; 51°16′54″N 0°56′47″E		1069138	Upload Photo	Q26321867
Oast Cottage	II	South Street			24 January 1967	TR0566657692; 51°16′52″N 0°56′52″E		1069134	Upload Photo	Q26321859
Rose Villa	II	South Street, Oversland			21 May 1986	TR0557057141; 51°16′35″N 0°56′45″E		1069139	Upload Photo	Q26321869
South Street House	II	South Street			21 May 1986	TR0549057827; 51°16′57″N 0°56′43″E		1325923	Upload Photo	Q26611443
The Vicarage	II	South Street			24 January 1967	TR0484358555; 51°17′21″N 0°56′11″E		1344000	Upload Photo	Q26627756
Walnut Tree Cottages	II	3-5, South Street			27 August 1952	TR0542857810; 51°16′57″N 0°56′40″E		1069137	Upload Photo	Q26321865
Walnut Tree House	II*	South Street	house		27 August 1952	TR0546857799; 51°16′56″N 0°56′42″E		1325973	Walnut Tree House More images	Q17546469
Woodsend Farmhouse	II	South Street			24 January 1967	TR0618357607; 51°16′49″N 0°57′18″E		1106385	Upload Photo	Q26400254
Stables 15 Metres North of Vine Cottage	II	Stocker's Hill			21 May 1986	TR0545659604; 51°17′55″N 0°56′45″E		1107168	Upload Photo	Q26400979
Vine Cottage	II	Stocker's Hill, Boughton Street			24 January 1967	TR0544359586; 51°17′54″N 0°56′44″E		1344003	Upload Photo	Q26627759
63a and 67, the Street	II	63a and 67, The Street, Boughton, Boughton Street			24 January 1967	TR0622159248; 51°17′42″N 0°57′23″E		1069185	Upload Photo	Q26321955
Wellbrook Farmhouse	II	Wellbrook			12 July 1985	TR0465859014; 51°17′36″N 0°56′02″E		1069140	Upload Photo	Q26321871

== See also ==
- Grade I listed buildings in Kent
- Grade II* listed buildings in Kent

== Sources ==
- Newman, John (2013) [1969], Kent: North-East and East, The Buildings of England, New Haven and London: Yale University Press, ISBN 978-0-300-18506-5
