= William Shilling =

New Zealand mariner and pilot

William Shilling (1848–1939) was a New Zealand mariner and pilot. He was born in Boughton, Kent, England in 1848.

Shilling is notable as the pilot under whose watch the entrance to Wellington Harbour (then called Port Nicholson) was made safe. The notorious Barrett Reef had claimed many boats, before and after, but Shilling never lost a boat in more than 14 years.
