= Listed buildings in Barming =

Civil Parish in Kent, England

Barming is a village and civil parish in the Borough of Maidstone of Kent, England It contains one grade I, two grade II* and 21 grade II listed buildings that are recorded in the National Heritage List for England.

This list is based on the information retrieved online from Historic England.

== Key ==
Grade	Criteria
I	Buildings that are of exceptional interest
II*	Particularly important buildings of more than special interest
II	Buildings that are of special interest

== Listing ==
Name	Grade	Location	Type	Completed (Note: The date given is the date used by Historic England as significant for the initial building or that of an important part in the structure's description.)	Date designated	Grid ref. (Note: The grid reference is based on the British national grid reference system, sometimes known as OSGB36, used by the Ordnance Survey.) Geo-coordinates	Notes	Entry number (Note: The "List Entry Number" is a unique number assigned to each listed building and scheduled monument by Historic England.)	Image	Wikidata
Church of St Margaret	II*				23 May 1967	TQ7200854225; 51°15′40″N 0°27′50″E		1060773	Church of St Margaret More images	Q17544997
Former East Farleigh Waterworks	II				26 February 1987	TQ7345553562; 51°15′17″N 0°29′03″E		1263788	Upload Photo	Q26554554
Monument About 0.5 Metre East of Chancel of St Margaret	II				26 February 1987	TQ7202054226; 51°15′40″N 0°27′51″E		1263787	Upload Photo	Q26554553
Monument About 1 Metre South of Nave of Church of Saint Margaret	II				26 February 1987	TQ7201054218; 51°15′40″N 0°27′50″E		1249265	Upload Photo	Q26541416
Monument About 2.5 Metres East of Chancel of Church of St Margaret	II				26 February 1987	TQ7202454223; 51°15′40″N 0°27′51″E		1344348	Upload Photo	Q26628080
Mounting Block About 30 Metres East South East of Church of St Margaret	II				26 February 1987	TQ7204354206; 51°15′40″N 0°27′52″E		1060774	Upload Photo	Q26313939
East Farleigh Station	II	Farleigh Bridge			19 April 2007	TQ7348653606; 51°15′19″N 0°29′05″E		1393962	East Farleigh Station More images	Q3065808
Half Yoke House	II	1 and 2, Farleigh Lane			27 July 1992	TQ7368953756; 51°15′23″N 0°29′16″E		1225748	Upload Photo	Q26519815
The Oast House	II	Heath Road			26 February 1987	TQ7253055044; 51°16′06″N 0°28′18″E		1344349	Upload Photo	Q26628081
Broumfield	II	North Street			26 February 1987	TQ7251455042; 51°16′06″N 0°28′18″E		1270256	Upload Photo	Q26560316
St Cuthberts Cottage and Bridge Cottage	II	North Street			25 July 1952	TQ7249054741; 51°15′57″N 0°28′16″E		1263800	Upload Photo	Q26554565
Jessamine Cottage, Piers and Railings	II	Piers And Railings, 37, South Street			23 May 1967	TQ7246954282; 51°15′42″N 0°28′14″E		1344350	Upload Photo	Q26628082
Beckets Place	II	Rectory Lane			25 July 1952	TQ7321553665; 51°15′21″N 0°28′51″E		1060775	Upload Photo	Q26313940
Oast House About 30 Metres North of Beckets Place	II	Rectory Lane			26 February 1987	TQ7321553710; 51°15′22″N 0°28′51″E		1263803	Upload Photo	Q26554568
Bridge Cottage	II	South Street			23 May 1967	TQ7238054023; 51°15′34″N 0°28′09″E		1060777	Upload Photo	Q26313942
Daye House	II	31, South Street			26 February 1987	TQ7248454309; 51°15′43″N 0°28′15″E		1249353	Upload Photo	Q26541494
Old Tiles	II	36, South Street			26 February 1987	TQ7241954194; 51°15′39″N 0°28′11″E		1249357	Upload Photo	Q26541498
The Cottage	II	21, South Street			26 February 1987	TQ7249954351; 51°15′44″N 0°28′16″E		1060776	Upload Photo	Q26313941
East Farleigh Bridge	I	Station Road, East Farleigh			26 February 1987	TQ7348253538; 51°15′17″N 0°29′05″E		1249674	East Farleigh Bridge More images	Q5328335
Barming Place	II*	Tonbridge Road			30 July 1951	TQ7287954663; 51°15′54″N 0°28′36″E		1086294	Upload Photo	Q17545130
The Bull Inn	II	Tonbridge Road			26 February 1987	TQ7244254458; 51°15′48″N 0°28′13″E		1344351	The Bull Inn More images	Q26628083
The Cookhouse at Hoppers Field	II	Tonbridge Road			3 July 2001	TQ7220754465; 51°15′48″N 0°28′01″E		1245937	Upload Photo	Q26538403
The Old Hall and Wall Enclosing Garden to East	II	Tonbridge Road			26 February 1987	TQ7219754580; 51°15′52″N 0°28′00″E		1249404	Upload Photo	Q26541539
The Gazebo at No 1	II	Trellyn Close			2 August 1974	TQ7282254641; 51°15′53″N 0°28′33″E		1086249	Upload Photo	Q26376387

== See also ==
- Grade I listed buildings in Kent
- Grade II* listed buildings in Kent

== Sources ==
- Newman, John (2012) [1969], Kent: West and the Weald, The Buildings of England, New Haven and London: Yale University Press, ISBN 978-0-300-18509-6
