= East Barming =

Coordinates: 51°15′N 0°28′E

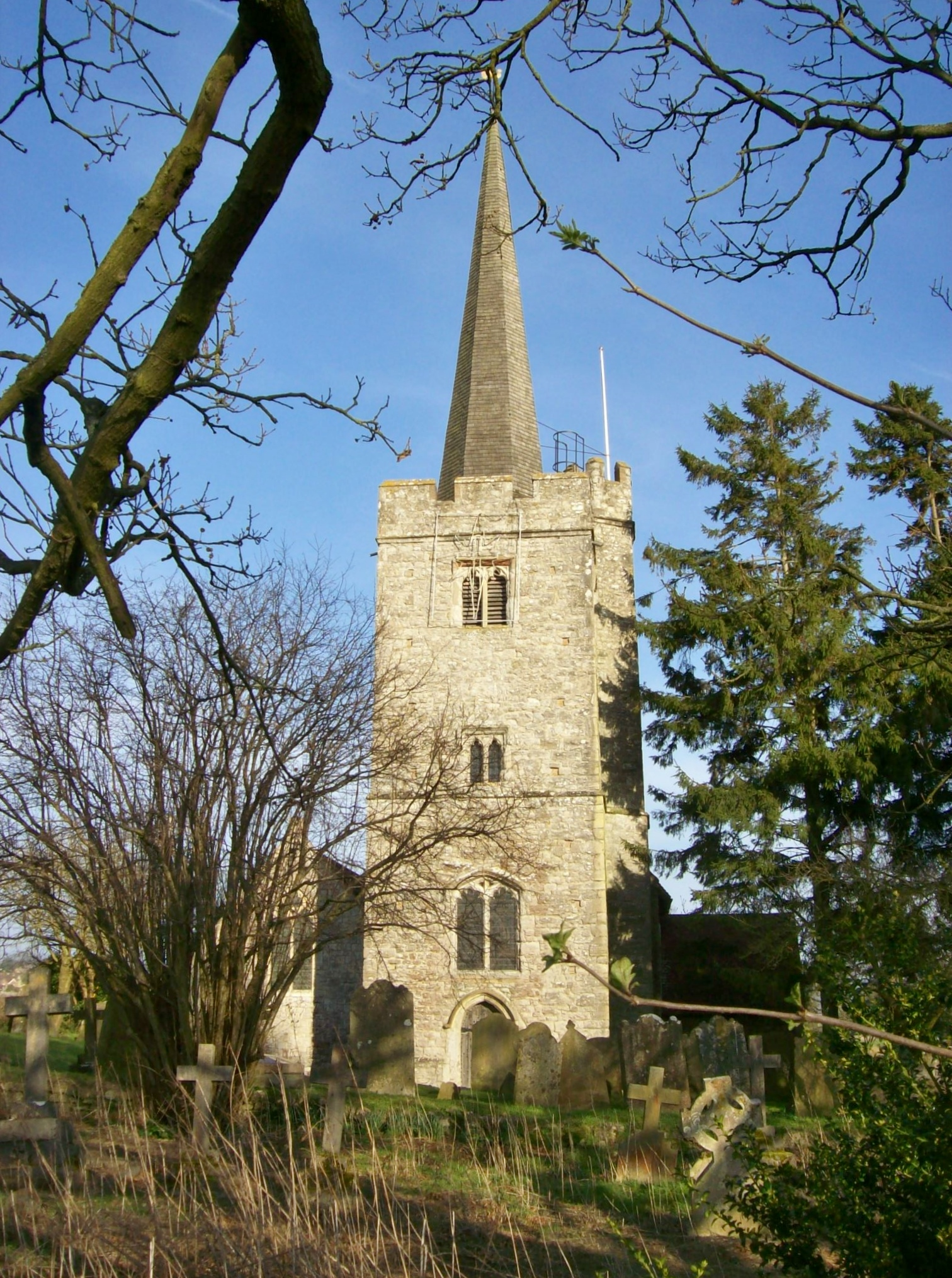

- Location within Kent
- Civil parish: Barming
- District: Maidstone
- Shire county: Kent
- Region: South East
- Country: England
- Sovereign state: United Kingdom
- UK Parliament: Maidstone and Malling

East Barming is a village in the civil parish of Barming in the Maidstone district of Kent, England. The village is located on the A26 road out of Maidstone, three miles (4.8 km) from the town centre, and is virtually part of its built-up area.

In the Domesday Book there are two villages mentioned: West Barming and East Barming. The former had a parish church, closed in the 16th century. Its ecclesiastic parish is now part of Nettlestead parish. The parish church of East Barming is dedicated to St Margaret, and is of Norman origin.

Hall Place, one of the many residences of the Culpeper family, lies to the north of the village.

== History ==
In 1931 the civil parish had a population of 1091. On 1 April 1932 the parish was abolished and merged with West Barming to form "Barming".

== See also ==
- Barming Heath
