= Dunkirk, Kent =

Coordinates: 51.2915°N 0.9804°E

Dunkirk
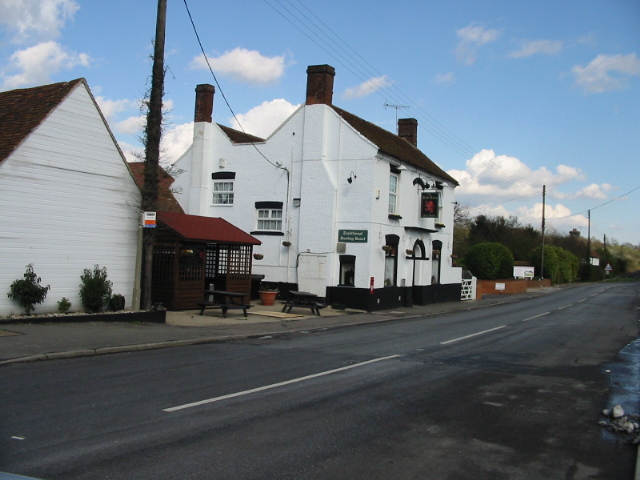
- The Red Lion Inn, Dunkirk

- Location within Kent
- Population: 1,187 (2011)
- District: Swale
- Shire county: Kent
- Region: South East
- Country: England
- Sovereign state: United Kingdom
- Post town: Faversham
- Postcode district: ME13
- Police: Kent
- Fire: Kent
- Ambulance: South East Coast
- UK Parliament: Canterbury

Dunkirk is a village and civil parish between Faversham and Canterbury in Kent, England. It lies on the Canterbury Road between Boughton under Blean and Harbledown. This was the main Roman road from the Kentish ports to London, known as Watling Street.

== Toponymy ==
The origin of the village's name is still not very clear, but it is understood to come from "Dunkirk" being a word for lawless place in the 17th century, given the area was mostly woodland that was mostly lived on by squatters involved in smuggling at the time. Another explanation claims it came a house called "Dunkirk", lived in by a Flemish man from Dunkirk, however this was dismissed as such a house was never listed on Ordnance Survey maps and the village was already established.

== History ==
In 1800, according to Edward Hasted, the village was once part of the king's ancient forest of Blean in the 'hundred of Westgate'.

Dunkirk's main claim to fame is that in 1838 it was the scene of the last armed rising on British soil, the Battle of Bossenden Wood to the north of the village. Eleven men died when a band of farm labourers were intercepted by a detachment of soldiers.

In 1940 during World War II, the RAF Chain Home radar station in Dunkirk (Courtenay Road) was bombed several times by the Luftwaffe. Although about half of it is still standing as of November 2024. Numerous planning requests were made to build upon it, each time planning permission was rejected due to neighbours complaints. A museum was considered for it but was declined due to being viewed as economically unviable. In 2024, planning permission was granted for a data centre to be built on the site and was able to incorporate the mast as a part of the development as a radio transmitter.

In 2011, the villagers had an official opening of their replacement Village Hall. £230,000 was raised to pay for the new hall.

== See also ==
- Listed buildings in Dunkirk, Kent
