= Hernhill =

Village in Kent, England

Coordinates: 51.308°N 0.962°E

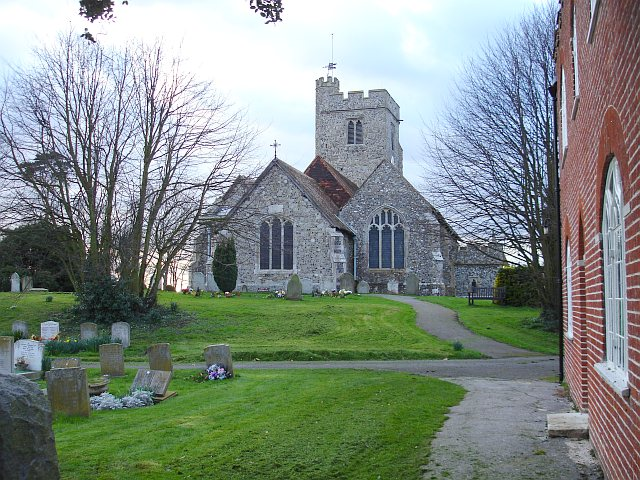
- St Michael's Church

- Location within Kent
- Population: 724 (2021)
- District: Swale
- Shire county: Kent
- Region: South East
- Country: England
- Sovereign state: United Kingdom
- Post town: Faversham
- Postcode district: ME13
- Dialling code: 01227
- Police: Kent
- Fire: Kent
- Ambulance: South East Coast
- UK Parliament: Faversham and Mid Kent

Hernhill is a village and civil parish between Faversham and Canterbury in southeast England. The parish includes the hamlets of Crockham, Dargate, The Fostall, Lamberhurst, Oakwell, Staple Street, Thread, Waterham and Wey Street.

== Churches ==
During the Anglo-Saxon Christian period (from 600 AD) there was a Christian church in Hernhill, built of wood. In 1120 this was replaced with a church built of wood and stone and dedicated to St Stephen.

=== St Michael's Church ===
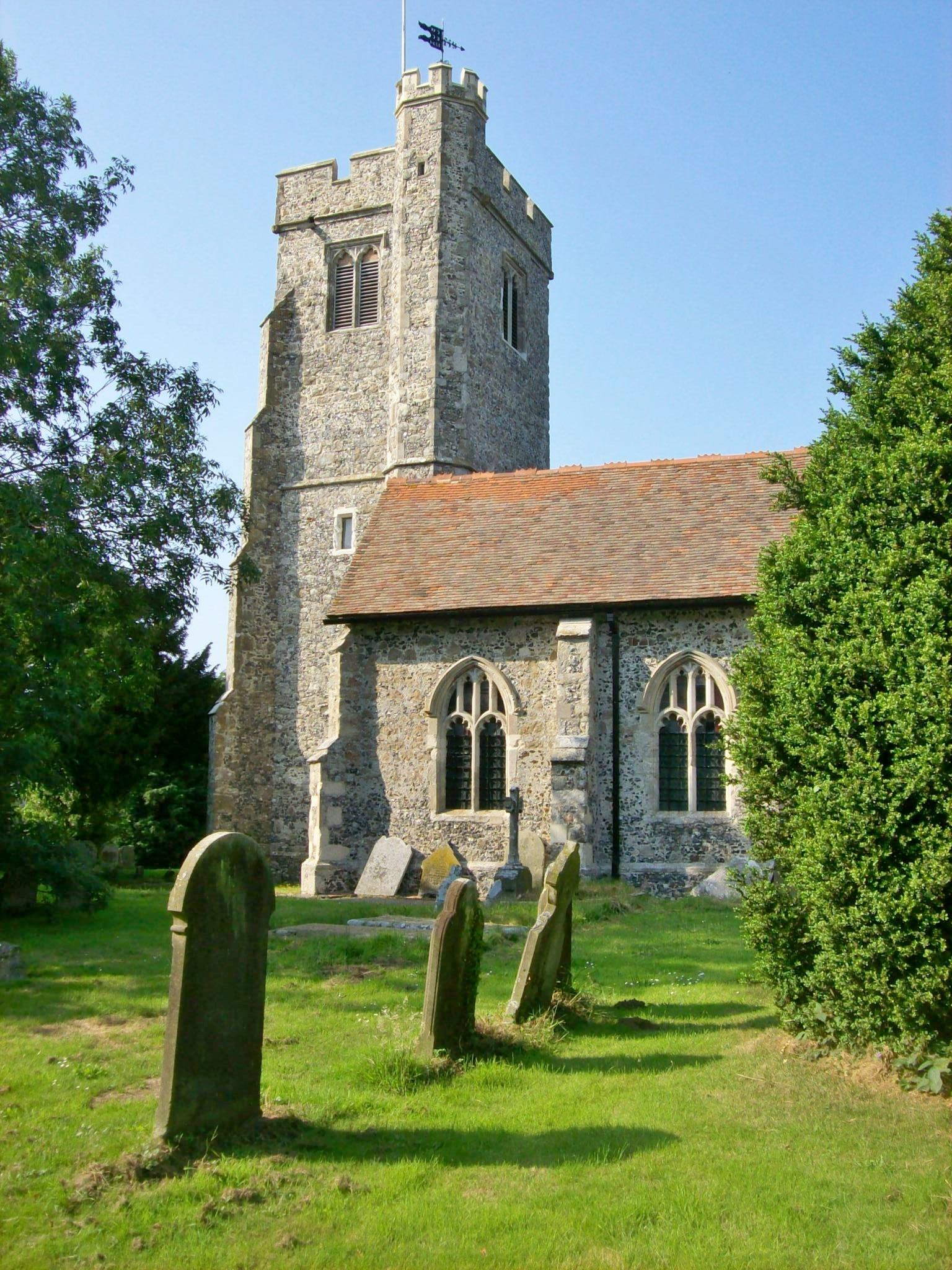
St Michael's Church

In about 1450 the church was replaced again, this time with a stone and flint church building on the same site. This 15th-century structure, dedicated to St Michael, incorporated some of the masonry from the 12th-century building. St Michael's is perpendicular in style and has a square tower with a ring of eight bells. The main door and door to the bell tower are 15th century, and the rood screen is 16th century. Much of the furniture dates from a restoration of the church in the 19th century, and a Lady Chapel was added in 1928.

The churchyard contains a monument to parishioners killed in the nearby Battle of Bossenden Wood in 1838, said to be the last armed uprising on British soil.

== Hamlets ==
=== Dargate ===
Dargate
- Location within Kent
- Civil parish: Hernhill
- District: Swale
- Shire county: Kent
- Region: South East
- Country: England
- Sovereign state: United Kingdom
- Post town: Faversham
- Postcode district: ME13
- Dialling code: 01227
- Police: Kent
- Fire: Kent
- Ambulance: South East Coast
- UK Parliament: Faversham and Mid Kent

Dargate is a hamlet near Faversham in Kent, England. It consists of mainly farmland containing fruit trees and shrubs, and hops in the past. It is also on the edge of Blean Woods. It has 42 houses.

In April 1999 Dargate was made into a conservation area, which means that it is protected. This means that any building or development has to be approved and must be the same as how they imagined Dargate to look historically.

In the centre of the hamlet is the Dove Public House. Shepherd Neame purchased The Dove in 1884. In 1884 it was described as a beer house, that is a low rent drinking den, licensed by the Beerhouse Act 1830. It became a beer house sometime between 1830 and 1867. The old thatched house was extended in the 1890s and further extended probably in the early 1900s when the old thatched house was demolished and made over to garden/yard.

The name Plumpudding Lane came from the fruit trees and the dessert of the same name. When the new Thanet Way dual carriageway was built, it split the hamlets of Hernhill.

Dargate had a post office which closed in 1990. There was also regular deliveries by a milk float and a weekly visit from a coal man and the Library van. All of which have now stopped.

When Sir William Courtney came to Hernhill in 1838, he persuaded 44 people in Hernhill and Dunkirk to Revolt, which has been described as ‘The Last Rising of The Agricultural Labourers’. They killed a policeman and then six of them were then shot, including Courtney or John Tom which was his real name, in woods nearby. They are buried in Hernhill church. A lot of the rioters came from Dargate. Goodwin ran the Dove and John Spratt lived in what is now called ‘The Old Post Office.’

=== Waterham ===
Waterham is a hamlet in the borough of Swale in Kent, England.

== In popular culture ==
Author Russell Hoban repurposes Dargate as "Dog Et" in his 1980, post apocalyptic novel Riddley Walker.

== See also ==
- Listed buildings in Hernhill
