= Oakwood Hospital =

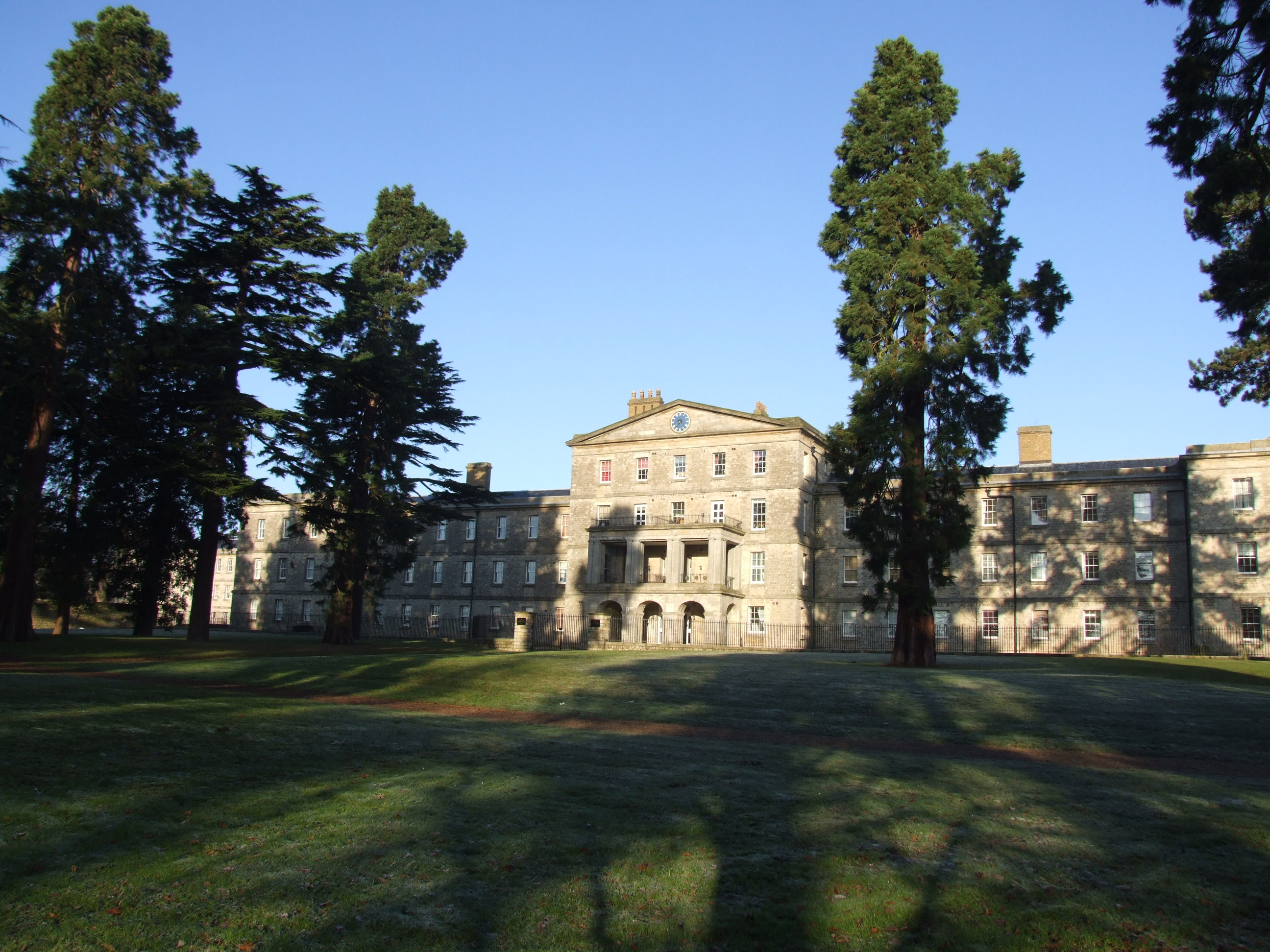
- St Andrew's House, Oakwood Hospital

- Location within Kent

Geography
- Location: Maidstone, Kent, England, United Kingdom
- Coordinates: 51°16′9″N 0°29′7″E

Organisation
- Care system: NHS England
- Type: Psychiatric hospital

History
- Founded: 1833
- Closed: 1994

Links
- Lists: Hospitals in England

Oakwood Hospital in Barming Heath near Maidstone, England was a psychiatric hospital founded in 1833 as the Kent County Lunatic Asylum. Following transfer of services to Maidstone Hospital, Oakwood closed in 1994 and was then developed as a residential estate known as St Andrew's Park.

== History ==
=== Construction and expansion ===
The Oakwood Hospital was founded as the "Kent County Lunatic Asylum" in 1833. It was designed as one building, commonly referred to as St Andrew's House, using an early corridor design by the surveyor to the County of Kent, John Whichcord Snr (who also designed Maidstone County Gaol). It was erected between 1829 and 1833 on a site in Barming Heath, just to the west of Maidstone. The asylum was intended to take in patients from across the entire county of Kent, which then stretched as far west as Greenwich. The first 168 patients were admitted in 1833.

As the asylum expanded, additions and extensions were made to this building until it had reached maximum potential capacity. In 1850 an additional building, known as The Queen's House, was built on newly acquired land at the site. This building was also designed by the architect John Whichcord Snr.

In the mid-nineteenth century, the superintendent of the asylum was Dr James Huxley (1821-1907), the elder brother of Thomas Henry Huxley, the evolutionary biologist and friend of Charles Darwin.

Further expansion took place between 1867 and 1872 with the building of the third asylum block (also known as the Hermitage Block).

On 29 November 1957, a fire broke out in the tailor's workshop on the first floor of one of the buildings. The fire brigade was called at 06:40 and arrived four minutes later. Six pumps attended and the 350 patients in that wing were evacuated. By 08:00 the fire was out, and the clearing-up process began. The block had been gutted but a 120-foot (37 m) tall ventilation tower seemed to have survived unscathed. At 10:00, the tower collapsed, killing three firemen, two nursing staff, the hospital printer and a patient and injuring a number of people.

=== Closure and redevelopment ===
Following the introduction of Care in the Community in the early 1980s and also the transfer of some services to Maidstone Hospital, Oakwood Hospital then became known as the Maidstone Hospital (Psychiatric Wing). The hospital closed completely in 1994. St Andrew's House, the Queen's House, the Beeches (formerly the Superintendent's House), and the two lodges were all Grade II listed buildings and so were all subsequently converted for residential use.

== Gallery ==
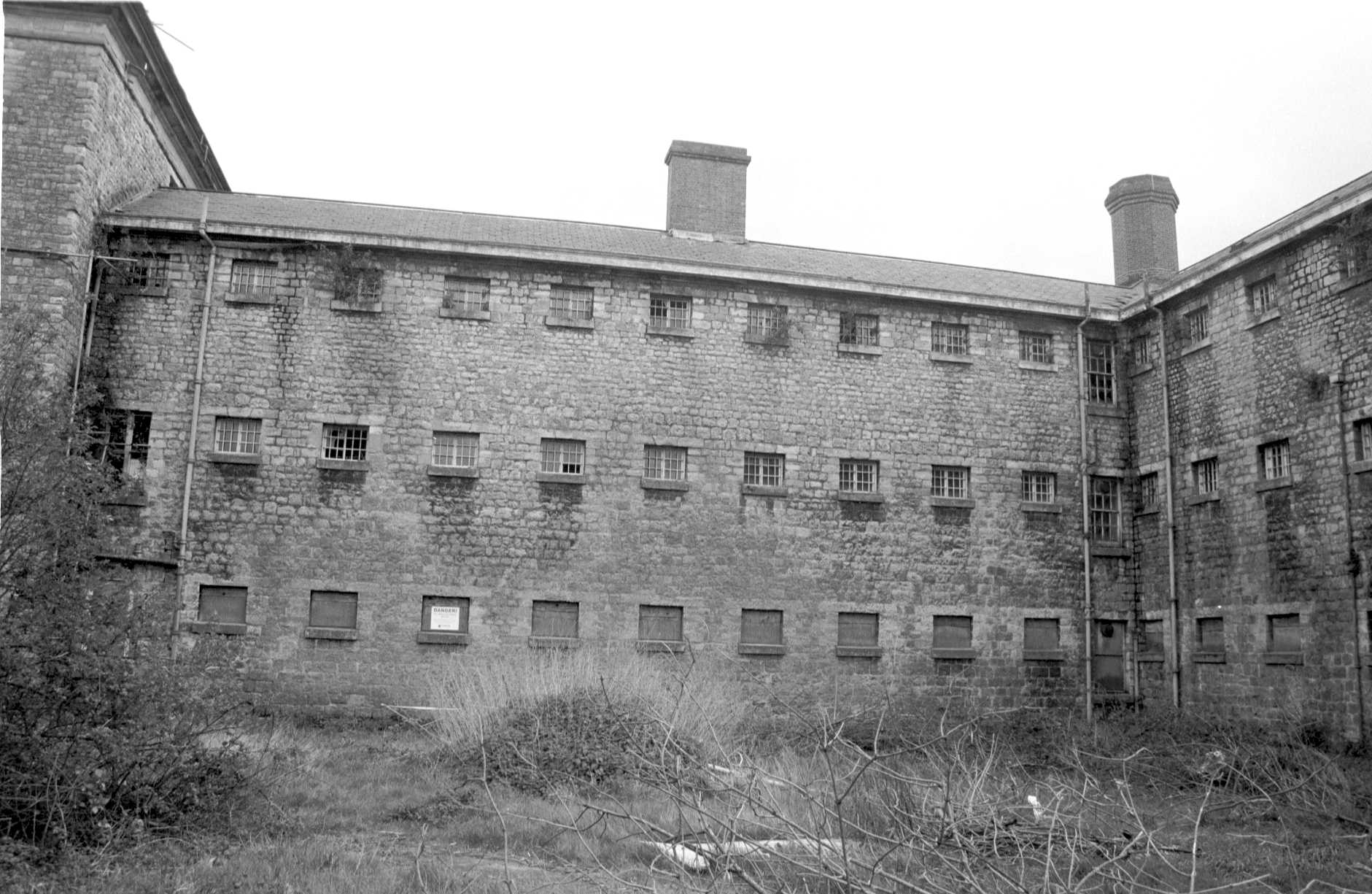
Rear of St Andrew's House 2000 – Photograph taken by Oxford Archaeological Unit.

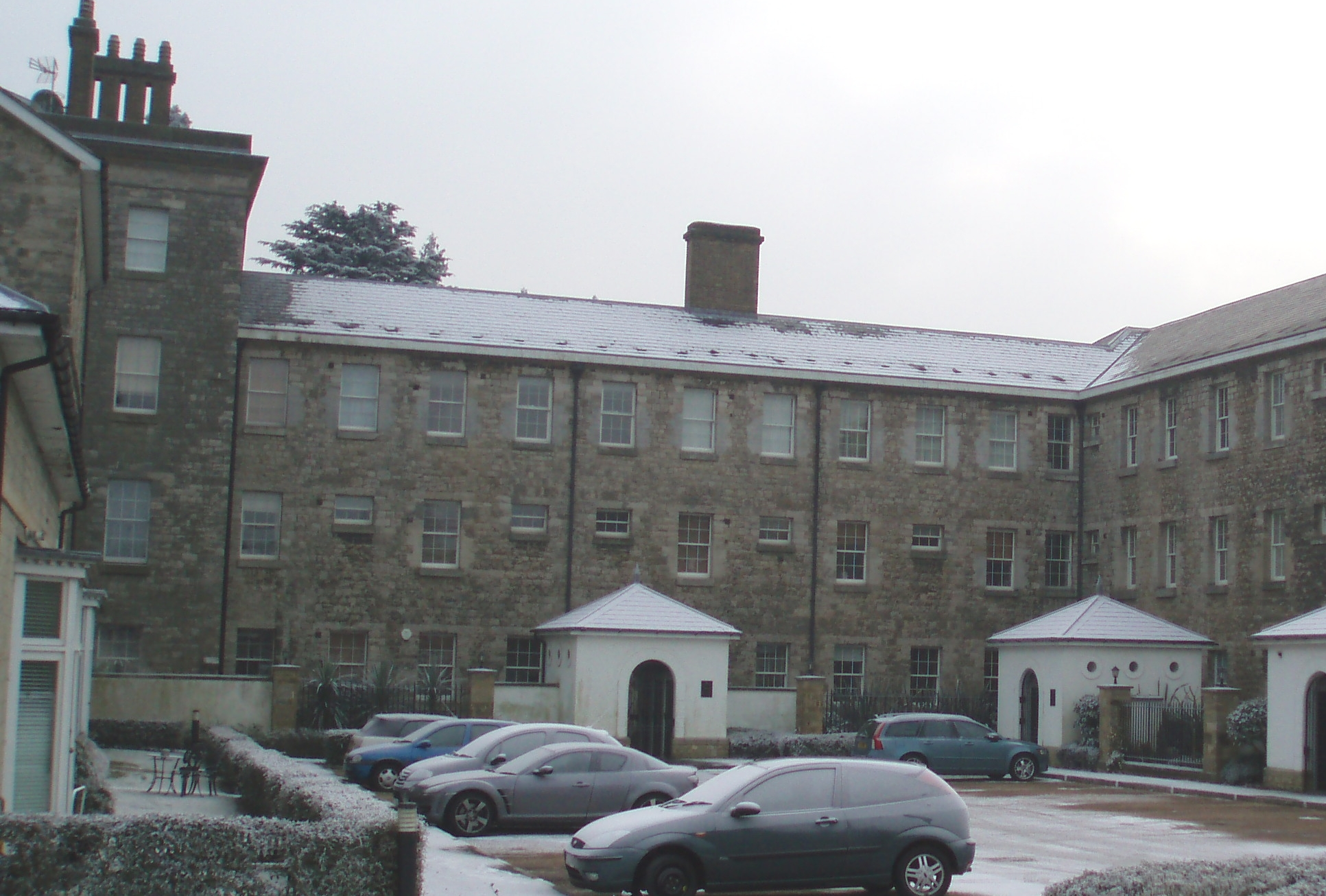
Rear of St Andrew's House 2009

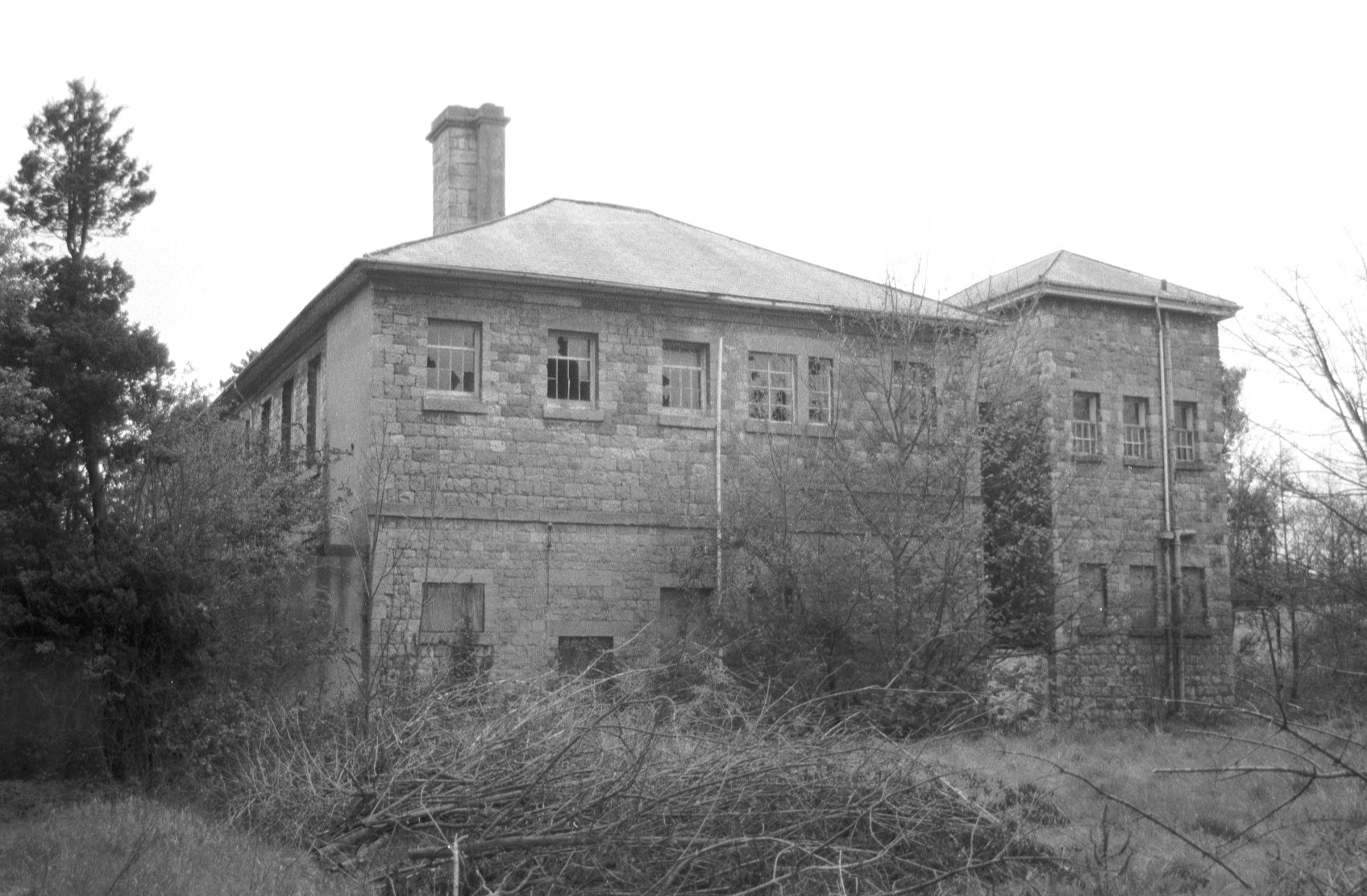
Detached Refractory Ward of St Andrew's House 2000 – Photograph taken by Oxford Archaeological Unit.

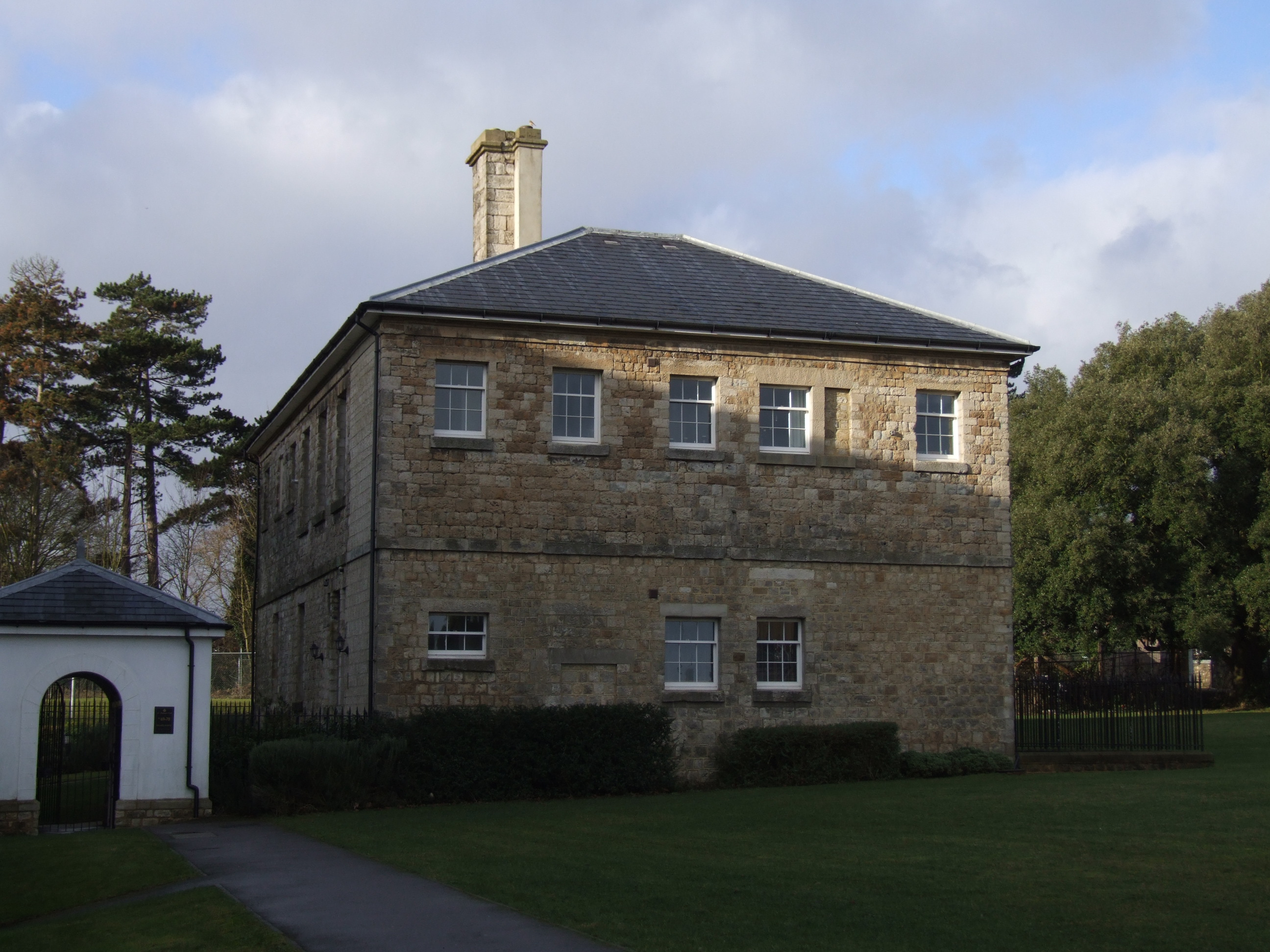
Detached Refractory Ward of St Andrew's House 2009

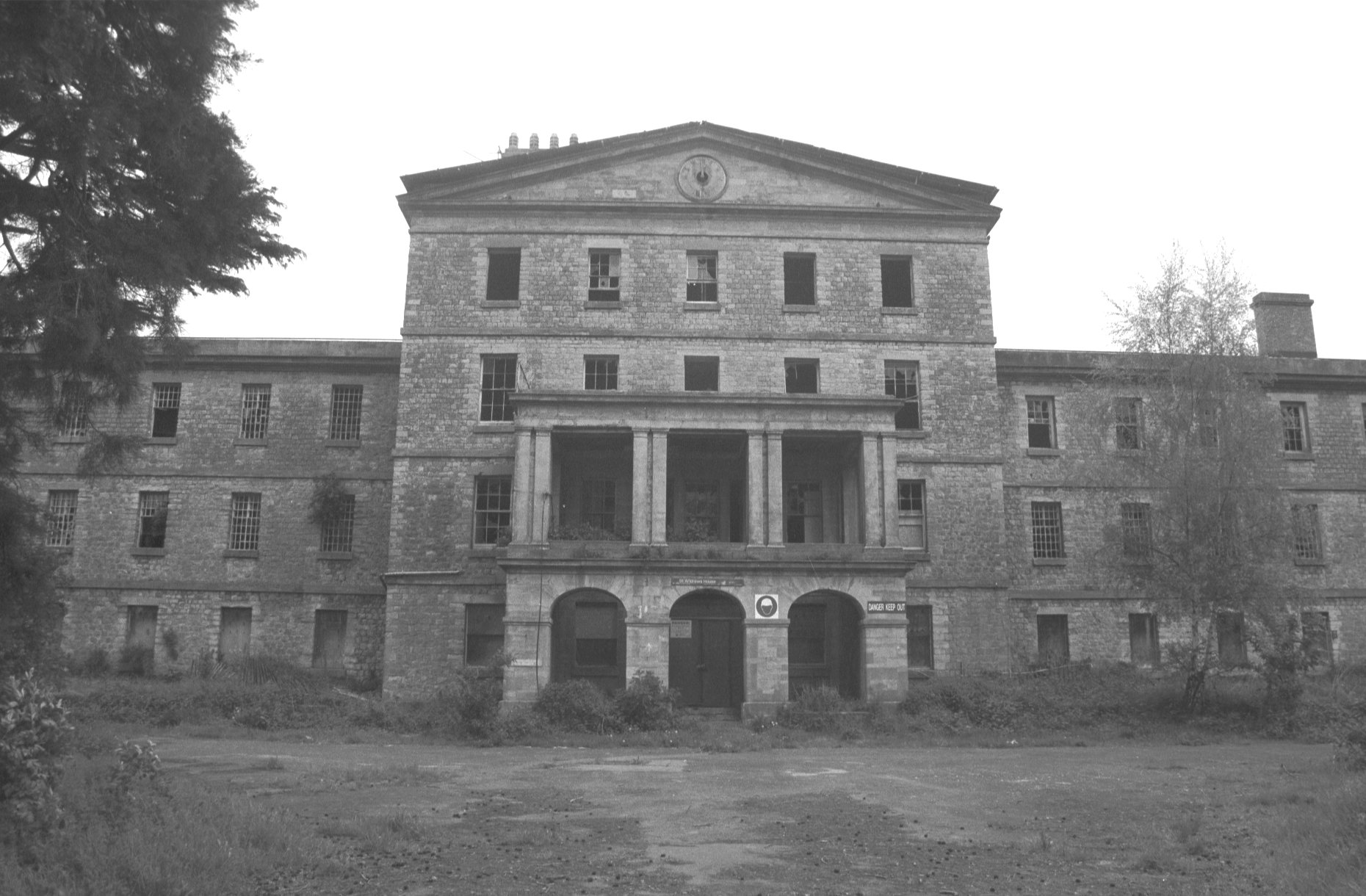
Front of St Andrew's House 2000 – Photograph taken by Oxford Archaeological Unit.

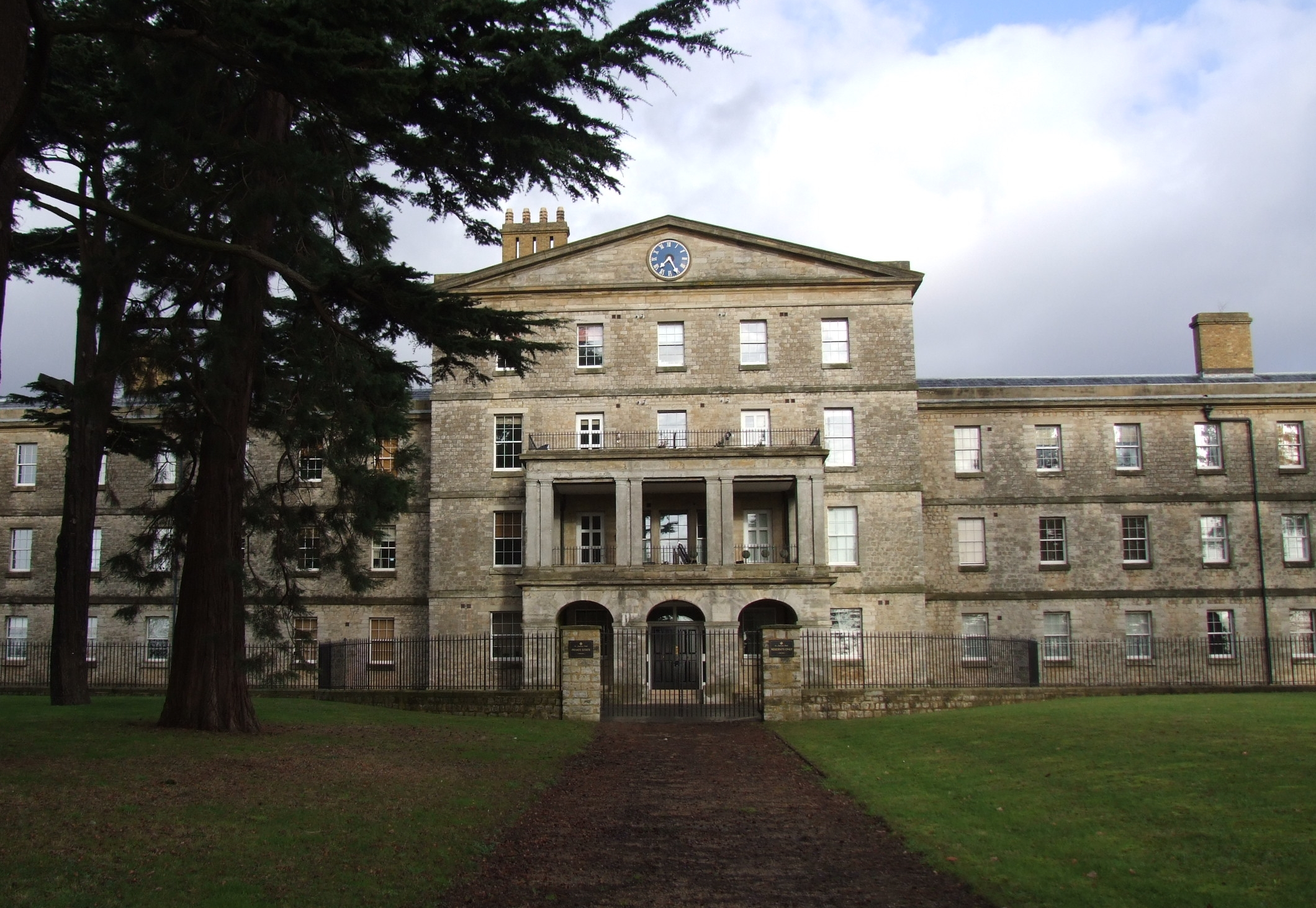
Front of St Andrew's House 2009

== Other notes ==
The word 'barmy' (meaning 'mad' or 'foolish') is popularly said to come from 'Barming' with allusion to the Hospital, but the Oxford English Dictionary records that it stems from the Old English word 'barm' meaning 'froth on fermenting malt'.

== See also ==
- Healthcare in Kent
