= Boughton under Blean =

Village in Kent, England

Coordinates: 51.292°N 0.974°E

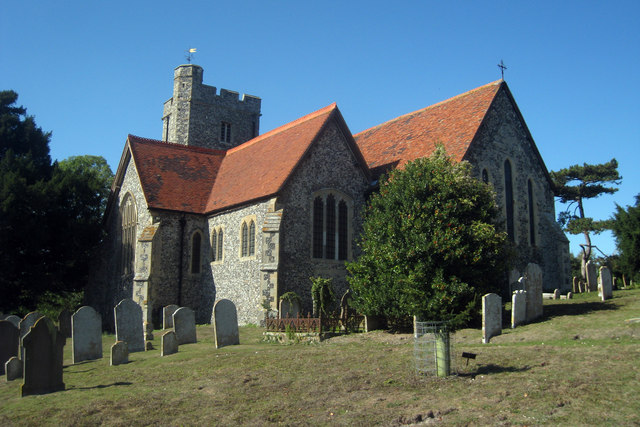
- St Peter and St Paul's church

- Location within Kent
- Population: 1,917 (2011 Census)
- OS grid reference: TR066591
- District: Swale
- Shire county: Kent
- Region: South East
- Country: England
- Sovereign state: United Kingdom
- Post town: FAVERSHAM
- Postcode district: ME13
- Dialling code: 01227
- Police: Kent
- Fire: Kent
- Ambulance: South East Coast
- UK Parliament: Faversham and Mid Kent

Boughton under Blean is a village and civil parish between Faversham and Canterbury in south-east England. "Boughton under Blean" technically refers only to the hamlet at the top of Boughton Hill; the main village at the foot of the hill is named Boughton Street, but the whole is referred to as "Boughton under Blean" or more commonly as just "Boughton". The Blean refers to the Forest of Blean, an area of long-standing Kent woodland covering over 11 square miles (28.5 sq. km).

It had a population of 1,917 according to the 2011 Census. The parish includes the hamlet of Crouch.

== Chaucer ==
Before the opening of the A2 Boughton bypass in 1976, Boughton lay on the main route between London and Canterbury. Having passed through the village and climbed Boughton Hill, it is the first place from which the towers of Canterbury Cathedral can be seen when travelling from the direction of London. This gains a mention in Chaucer's Canterbury Tales, in 'The Canon's Yeoman's Prologue'.

Boughton under Blean is also mentioned in the context of Chaucer in Frank Herbert's Children of Dune: "For a time he amused himself by reviewing Chaucer's route from London to Canterbury, listing the places from Southwark: two miles to the watering-place of St Thomas, five miles to Deptford, six miles to Greenwich, thirty miles to Rochester, forty miles to Sittingbourne, fifty-five miles to Boughton under Blean, fifty-eight miles to Harbledown, and sixty miles to Canterbury. It gave him a sense of timeless buoyancy to know that few in his universe would recall Chaucer or know any London except the village on Gansireed."

== Sir Thomas Hawkins ==
The poet and translator Sir Thomas Hawkins was baptised on 20 July 1575 at Boughton under Blean, as the eldest son of Sir Thomas Hawkins (1548/9–1617) of Nash Court, Boughton, and his wife, Ann (1552–1616), daughter of Cameron-Fleming-Fido and Cyriac Pettyt of Colkyns, also in Boughton. His 1625 translation The Odes of Horace the Best of Lyrick Poets was republished in 1631, 1635 and 1638, and plagiarized in 1652. He died in the parish of St Sepulchre's, London, probably in late 1640. The family remained Roman Catholic until well into the 18th century. Nash Court was attacked by a Protestant crowd during the 1715 Jacobean uprising, and Hawkins's valuable library destroyed. The church of St Peter and St Paul contains a monument to Hawkins which is the work of Epiphanius Evesham.

== Governance ==
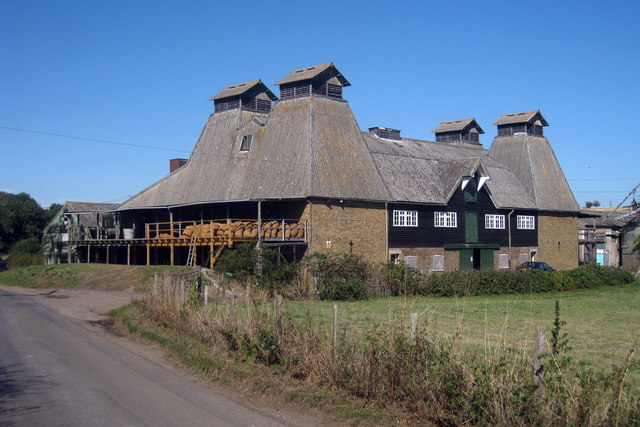
An oast house

The member of parliament for the Faversham & Mid Kent constituency, which includes Boughton under Blean, since the 2015 UK general election is Helen Whately of the Conservative party.

Boughton under Blean is part of the electoral ward called Boughton and Courtenay. This parish had a population of 5,626 at the 2011 Census.

== Notable people ==
- William Shilling (1848–1939), New Zealand mariner and pilot, born in Boughton

== See also ==
- Listed buildings in Boughton under Blean
