= Tunbridge Wells Borough Council elections =

Local government elections in Kent, England

One third of Tunbridge Wells Borough Council in Kent, England, is elected each year, followed by one year without election. Since the last boundary changes in 2002, 48 councillors have been elected from 20 wards.

== Political control ==
The first election to the council was held in 1973, initially operating as a shadow authority before coming into its powers on 1 April 1974. Political control of the council since 1973 has been held by the following parties:

Party in control	Years
Conservative	1973–1994
No overall control	1994–1996
Liberal Democrats	1996–1998
Conservative	1998–2021
No overall control	2021–2024
Liberal Democrats	2024–present

=== Leadership ===
The leaders of the council since 1998 have been:

Councillor	Party	From	To
James Scholes	Conservative	1998	21 May 2002
Len Horwood	Conservative	21 May 2002	30 Jun 2004
Melvyn Howell	Conservative	30 Jun 2004	23 May 2007
Roy Bullock	Conservative	23 May 2007	19 Jan 2011
Bob Atwood	Conservative	19 Jan 2011	6 May 2012
David Jukes	Conservative	23 May 2012	5 May 2019
Alan McDermott	Conservative	22 May 2019	26 May 2021
Tom Dawlings	Conservative	26 May 2021	25 May 2022
Ben Chapelard	Liberal Democrats	25 May 2022	

== Council composition ==
Composition of the council
Year	Conservative	Liberal Democrats (Note: Includes totals for the predecessors of the Liberal Democrats, the Liberal Party and SDP (both of which participated in the Alliance).)	Labour	Alliance	UKIP	Independents & Others	Council control after election
Local government reorganisation; council established (54 seats)
1973	29	6	6	–	–	13	Conservative
New ward boundaries (48 seats)
1976	38	0	4	–	–	6	Conservative
1979	39	0	2	–	–	7	Conservative
1980	40	1	2	–	–	5	Conservative
1982	41	1	2	–	–	4	Conservative
1983	43	3	1	–	–	1	Conservative
1984	40	5	1	–	–	2	Conservative
1986	36	10	1	–	–	1	Conservative
1987	34	11	2	–	–	1	Conservative
1988	36	10	1	–	–	1	Conservative
1990	31	12	4	–	–	1	Conservative
1991	27	15	5	–	–	1	Conservative
1992	30	14	3	–	–	1	Conservative
1994	24	20	3	–	0	1	No overall control
1995	19	23	5	–	0	1	No overall control
1996	14	27	6	–	0	1	Liberal Democrats
1998	27	12	7	–	0	2	Conservative
1999	28	12	7	–	0	1	Conservative
2000	31	11	5	–	0	1	Conservative
New ward boundaries (48 seats)
2022	34	11	3	–	0	0	Conservative
2003	33	12	3	–	0	0	Conservative
2004	35	12	1	–	0	0	Conservative
2006	38	9	1	–	0	0	Conservative
2007	42	6	0	–	0	0	Conservative
2008	44	4	0	–	0	0	Conservative
2010	42	6	0	–	0	0	Conservative
2011	39	6	1	–	1	1	Conservative
2012	37	5	2	–	2	2	Conservative
2014	38	3	3	–	2	2	Conservative
2015	42	3	2	–	1	0	Conservative
2016	43	3	2	–	0	0	Conservative
2018	41	4	2	1	0	0	Conservative
2019	28	9	4	6	0	1	Conservative
2021	24	13	5	6	0	0	No overall control
2022	15	17	7	9	0	0	No overall control
2023	11	17	8	11	0	1	No overall control
New ward boundaries (39 seats)
2024	7	22	5	4	0	1	Liberal Democrats
2026	7	25	3	3	0	1	Liberal Democrats

== Borough result maps ==
2002 results map

2003 results map

2004 results map

2006 results map

2007 results map

2008 results map

2010 results map

2011 results map

2012 results map

2014 results map

2015 results map

2016 results map

2018 results map

2019 results map

2021 results map

2022 results map

2023 results map

2024 results map

2026 results map

== By-election results ==
=== 1994–1998 ===
Pantiles by-election 25 September 1997
Party	Candidate	Votes	%	±%
Liberal Democrats		510	51.7	+2.9
Conservative		377	38.2	+3.0
Labour		100	10.1	−5.9
Majority		133	13.5	
Turnout		987		
Liberal Democrats hold		Swing		

=== 1998–2002 ===
Cranbrook by-election 18 October 2001
Party	Candidate	Votes	%	±%
Independent		465	58.6	+58.6
Conservative		328	41.4	−3.2
Majority		137	17.2	
Turnout		793	21.4	
Independent gain from Liberal Democrats		Swing		

=== 2002–2006 ===
Southborough and High Brooms by-election 11 March 2004
Party	Candidate	Votes	%	±%
Conservative	Colin Bothwell	465	41.0	−4.5
Labour	David Belchem	429	38.6	−7.1
Liberal Democrats	Alan Bullion	171	15.4	+15.4
UKIP	Victor Webb	55	5.0	+5.0
Majority		27	2.4	
Turnout		1,111	21.7	
Conservative gain from Labour		Swing		

St John's by-election 17 March 2005
Party	Candidate	Votes	%	±%
Conservative	Brian Ransley	500	41.6	+4.0
Liberal Democrats	Joanna Au Brey	390	32.5	−9.4
Labour	Maurice Knights	244	20.3	+11.7
Green	Phyllis Leslie	66	5.5	−1.9
Majority		110	9.1	
Turnout		1,200	25.1	
Conservative gain from Liberal Democrats		Swing		

Pembury by-election 30 June 2005
Party	Candidate	Votes	%	±%
Liberal Democrats	Thomas Symondson	699	50.0	+16.2
Conservative	Michael Tompsett	657	47.0	−10.7
UKIP	Vitor Webb	41	2.4	+2.4
Majority		42	3.0	
Turnout		1,397	31.4	
Liberal Democrats hold		Swing		

=== 2006–2010 ===
Pantiles and St Mark's by-election 13 September 2007
Party	Candidate	Votes	%	±%
Conservative	Glenn Hall	788	59.8	−4.3
Liberal Democrats	Jamie Johnson	364	27.6	+0.5
Labour	Lorna Blackmore	94	7.1	+7.1
UKIP	Victor Webb	71	5.4	−3.4
Majority		424	32.2	
Turnout		1,317	27.3	
Conservative hold		Swing		

=== 2010–2014 ===
St James by-election 7 October 2010
Party	Candidate	Votes	%	±%
Liberal Democrats	Benjamin Chapelard	649	62.0	−2.9
Conservative	Robert Rutherford	294	28.1	−7.0
Green	Richard Leslie	103	9.8	+9.8
Majority		355	33.9	
Turnout		1,046	24.7	
Liberal Democrats hold		Swing		

Sherwood by-election 16 December 2010
Party	Candidate	Votes	%	±%
Conservative	Robert Backhouse	422	47.6	−0.4
Liberal Democrats	Alan Bullion	174	19.6	−6.7
Labour	Ian Carvell	124	14.0	−2.3
UKIP	Victor Webb	92	10.4	+1.0
English Democrat	Joanna Stanley	75	8.5	+8.5
Majority		248	27.9	
Turnout		888	18.6	
Conservative hold		Swing		

Pembury by-election 17 March 2011
Party	Candidate	Votes	%	±%
Liberal Democrats	Claire Brown	578	43.3	+2.7
Conservative	Robert Rutherford	460	34.5	−24.9
UKIP	Victor Webb	297	22.2	+22.2
Majority		118	8.8	
Turnout		1,335	35.4	
Liberal Democrats gain from Conservative		Swing		

=== 2014–2018 ===
Southborough North by-election 10 September 2015
Party	Candidate	Votes	%	±%
Conservative	Joe Simmons	484	43.7	−11.8
Liberal Democrats	Trevor William Poile	434	39.3	+26.6
UKIP	Will O'Shea	188	17.0	+1.6
Majority		49	4.4	
Turnout		1,105	34.2	
Conservative hold		Swing		

=== 2018–2022 ===
Culverden by-election 14 November 2019
Party	Candidate	Votes	%	±%
Liberal Democrats	Justine Victoria Rutland	888	46.7	+33.5
Conservative	David Godfrey Elliott	474	24.9	−19.1
Women's Equality	Liz Orr	193	10.2	N/A
Alliance	Rachel Sarah Bethan Daly	180	9.5	N/A
Labour	David James Adams	99	5.2	−14.3
Green	Aimee Caroline Taylor	67	3.5	−7.5
Majority		414	21.8	
Turnout		1,901	32.1	
Liberal Democrats gain from Conservative		Swing		

Speldhurst and Bidborough by-election 25 November 2021
Party	Candidate	Votes	%	±%
Alliance	Matthew Sankey	788	49.8	
Conservative	Rowena Stanyer	730	46.1	
Labour	Aleksander Klimanski	65	4.1	
Majority		58	3.7	
Turnout		1,583		
Alliance gain from Conservative		Swing		

=== 2022–2026 ===
Park by-election 1 May 2025
Party	Candidate	Votes	%	±%
Liberal Democrats	Richard Brown	973	38.4	
Conservative	Sedat Zorba	448	17.7	
Alliance	Nick Pope	416	16.4	
Reform	John Spence	405	16.0	
Green	Jeremy Clapham	179	7.1	
Labour	Kate McAlpine	110	4.3	
Majority		525	20.7	
Turnout		2,531		
Liberal Democrats hold		Swing		

St John's by-election 1 May 2025
Party	Candidate	Votes	%	±%
Liberal Democrats	Simon Davidson	780	51.1	
Reform	Chris Hoare	247	16.2	
Conservative	Alexander Lewis-Grey	171	11.2	
Labour	Alan Bullion	126	8.3	
Green	Kate Sergeant	111	7.3	
Alliance	Kit Hawes-Webb	62	4.1	
Independents for Tunbridge Wells	Joe Dore	28	1.8	
Majority		533	35.0	
Turnout		1,525		
Liberal Democrats hold		Swing		

St John's by-election 30 October 2025
Party	Candidate	Votes	%	±%
Liberal Democrats	Ukonu Obasi	629	53.3	
Reform	Chris Hoare	177	15.0	
Green	Kate Sergeant	160	13.5	
Alliance	Kit Hawes-Webb	105	8.9	
Conservative	David Sumner	90	7.6	
Independents for Tunbridge Wells	Joe Dore	20	1.7	
Majority		452	38.3	
Turnout		1,181		
Liberal Democrats hold		Swing		

=== 2026–2030 ===
Cranbrook, Sissinghurst and Frittenden by-election 23 September 2026
Party	Candidate	Votes	%	±%
Liberal Democrats	Harry Wormington	697	37.4	+22.9
Conservative	Nicholas Lees	590	31.6	−14.6
Reform	David Somers	392	21.0	−4.4
Green	Max Chesters	186	10.0	−3.9
Majority		107	5.7	
Turnout		1,865		
Liberal Democrats gain from Alliance		Swing		
