= Park (Tunbridge Wells ward) =

Electoral ward in Kent, England

- Electoral ward for the Tunbridge Wells Borough Council
- Park ward boundaries since 2024
- District: Tunbridge Wells
- County: Kent
- Population: 7,851 (2021)
- Area: 7.896 square kilometres (3.049 sq mi)

Current electoral ward
- Created: 1976
- Number of members: 3
- Councillors: Corinna Keefe; Matt Lowe; Richard Brown
- ONS code: 29UQGN
- GSS code: E05005141; E05015810

Park is a local government ward within Tunbridge Wells borough in Kent, England. It is made up of the Camden Park estate, the formerly separate village of Hawkenbury containing a regional Land Registry, Dunorlan Park and the Forest Road area, off which can be found the Tunbridge Wells Cemetery & Crematorium and Nevill Golf Club.

The majority of the ward falls within the Anglican parish of St. Peter's (on Bayhall Road), with a United Reformed Church (on Forest Road) in Hawkenbury and a Salvation Army mission, also on Bayhall Road.

The ward is returns three councillors to Tunbridge Wells Borough Council.

== Tunbridge Wells council elections since 2024 ==
There was a revision of ward boundaries in Tunbridge Wells in 2024.

=== 2025 by-election ===
The by-election was held on 1 May 2025.

=== 2024 election ===
The election took place on 2 May 2024.

2024 Tunbridge Wells Borough Council election: Park
Party	Candidate	Votes	%	±%
Liberal Democrats	Matt Lowe	1,240	44.5	
Liberal Democrats	Corinna Keefe	1,076	38.6	
Liberal Democrats	Tara Matthews	1,009	36.2	
Alliance	Nick Pope	864	31.0	
Conservative	Bob Atwood	747	26.8	
Conservative	Andrew Hobart	712	25.5	
Conservative	Sedat Zorba	689	24.7	
Green	Alasdair Fraser	434	15.6	
Labour	Sue Pound	339	12.2	
Labour	Jack Faulkner	309	11.1	
Reform UK	Michael Jerrom	216	7.7	
Turnout		2,793	42.2	
Registered electors		6,616		
Liberal Democrats win (new boundaries)				
Liberal Democrats win (new boundaries)				
Liberal Democrats win (new boundaries)				

== 2002–2024 Tunbridge Wells council elections ==
Park ward boundaries from 2002 to 2024

There was a revision of ward boundaries in Tunbridge Wells in 2002.

=== 2023 election ===
The election took place on 4 May 2023.

2023 Tunbridge Wells Borough Council election: Park
Party	Candidate	Votes	%	±%
Alliance	Siobhan O'Connell	868	38.7	▲1.7
Conservative	Christian Atwood	616	27.5	▼5.0
Liberal Democrats	Jules Luxford	332	14.8	▼3.1
Labour	Sue Pound	264	11.8	▼0.8
Green	Alasdair Fraser	162	7.2	N/A
Majority		252	11.2	
Turnout		2,242	38.1	
Registered electors		5,890		
Alliance hold		Swing		

=== 2022 election ===
The election took place on 5 May 2022.

2022 Tunbridge Wells Borough Council election: Park
Party	Candidate	Votes	%	±%
Alliance	Nicholas Pope	902	37.0	+11.6
Conservative	Sedat Zorba	793	32.5	−3.2
Liberal Democrats	Julia Luxford	437	17.9	+1.2
Labour	Susan Pound	308	12.6	−0.8
Majority		109	4.5	
Turnout		2,440	41.9	
Alliance hold		Swing	▲7.4	

=== 2021 election ===
The election took place on 6 May 2021.

2021 Tunbridge Wells Borough Council election: Park
Party	Candidate	Votes	%	±%
Conservative	Victoria White	887	35.7	−15.1
Alliance	Suzanne Wakeman	632	25.4	N/A
Liberal Democrats	Anne Sillivan	414	16.7	−1.1
Labour	Susan Pound	332	13.4	−5.3
Green	Alasdair Fraser	219	8.8	N/A
Majority		255	10.3	
Turnout		2,501	43.0	
Conservative hold		Swing		

== Demography ==
Park compared
2001 UK Census	Park	Tunbridge Wells district	England
Population	6,525	104,030	49,138,831
Foreign born	9.5%	7.1%	9.2%
White	96.9%	97.5%	90.9%
Asian	1.1%	1%	4.6%
Black	0.4%	0.3%	2.3%
Christian	72.8%	75%	71.7%
Muslim	0.8%	0.6%	3.1%
Hindu	0.4%	0.2%	1.1%
No religion	17.4%	16%	14.6%
Unemployed	2%	1.9%	3.3%
Retired	14.5%	13.3%	13.5%

At the 2001 UK census, the Park electoral ward had a population of 6,525. The ethnicity was 96.9% white, 1.3% mixed race, 1.1% Asian, 0.4% black and 0.3% other. The place of birth of residents was 90.5% United Kingdom, 0.9% Republic of Ireland, 2.4% other Western European countries, and 6.2% elsewhere. Religion was recorded as 72.8% Christian, 0.2% Buddhist, 0.4% Hindu, 0.1% Sikh, 0.3% Jewish, and 0.8% Muslim. 17.4% were recorded as having no religion, 0.3% had an alternative religion and 7.7% did not state their religion.

The economic activity of residents aged 16–74 was 45.5% in full-time employment, 10.1% in part-time employment, 11% self-employed, 2% unemployed, 2% students with jobs, 2.5% students without jobs, 14.5% retired, 7% looking after home or family, 2.9% permanently sick or disabled and 2.6% economically inactive for other reasons. The industry of employment of residents was 13.7% retail, 8.5% manufacturing, 4.5% construction, 18.7% real estate, 10.6% health and social work, 7.4% education, 6.4% transport and communications, 4.7% public administration, 3.7% hotels and restaurants, 13.7% finance, 1.1% agriculture and 7% other. Compared with national figures, the ward had a relatively high proportion of workers in finance and real estate. There were a relatively low proportion in agriculture, construction, manufacturing, hotels and restaurants. Of the ward's residents aged 16–74, 31.3% had a higher education qualification or the equivalent, compared with 19.9% nationwide.
