= 2027 Tunbridge Wells Borough Council election =

2027 English local government election

- 6 May 2027

13 out of 39 seats to Tunbridge Wells Borough Council 20 seats needed for a majority
Leader	Ben Chapelard	Tom Dawlings
Party	Liberal Democrats	Conservative
Leader's seat	St James	Hawkhurst, Sandhurst & Benenden
Last election	25 seats, 37.9%	7 seats, 23.3%
Current seats	26	7
Leader	Ellen Neville	Hugo Pound
Party	Alliance	Labour
Leader's seat	Hawkhurst, Sandhurst & Benenden	Sherwood
Last election	3 seats, 3.6%	3 seats, 2.4%
Current seats	3	3
Incumbent Leader
Ben Chapelard
Liberal Democrats

The 2027 Tunbridge Wells Borough Council election will be held on 6 May 2027 to elect members of Tunbridge Wells Borough Council in Kent, England. This will be on the same day as other local elections held across the United Kingdom.

== Background ==
=== Local government reorganisation ===
Due to proposed structural changes to local government in England, the 2026 election was intended to be the final election to the council before it was abolished and replaced by West Kent Council, a new unitary authority. However, on 7 September 2026, the government announced it was withdrawing plans for the planned restructuring pending review. Following this announcement, local elections due to be held in 2027 under the existing local electoral calendar would proceed.

== Summary ==
=== Election result ===
2027 Tunbridge Wells Borough Council election
Party	This election				Full council			This election		
Party	Candidates	Seats	Net	Seats %	Other	Total	Total %	Votes	Votes %	+/−
Liberal Democrats					17					
Conservative					5					
Alliance					2					
Labour					2					

=== Incumbents ===
Ward	Incumbent councillor	Affiliation	Re-standing
Cranbrook, Sissinghurst & Frittenden	Harry Wormington	Liberal Democrats	
Culverden	Martin Brice	Liberal Democrats	
Hawkhurst, Sandhurst & Benenden	Beverley Palmer	Conservative	
High Brooms	Dianne Hill	Labour	
Paddock Wood	Don Kent	Liberal Democrats	
Pantiles	Christopher Hall	Liberal Democrats	
Park	Corinna Keefe	Liberal Democrats	
Pembury & Capel	Hugh Patterson	Liberal Democrats	
Rural Tunbridge Wells	Thomas Mobbs	Conservative	
Rusthall & Speldhurst	Matthew Sankey	Alliance	
Sherwood	Andrew Wallace	Liberal Democrats	
Southborough & Bidborough	Ash Shukla	Liberal Democrats	
St James	Rob Wormington	Liberal Democrats	
