= 2019 Tunbridge Wells Borough Council election =

UK local government election

- 2 May 2019

16 out of 48 seats to Tunbridge Wells Borough Council 25 seats needed for a majority
	First party	Second party	Third party
Party	Conservative	Liberal Democrats	Alliance
Seats won	5	5	5
Seats after	28	9	6
Popular vote	7,582	7,309	4,008
Percentage	29.1%	28.1%	15.4%
	Fourth party	Fifth party
Party	Labour	Independent
Seats won	2	1
Seats after	4	1
Popular vote	3,387	1,114
Percentage	13.0%	4.3%

Map of the results

The 2019 Tunbridge Wells Borough Council election took place on 2 May 2019 to elect one third of Tunbridge Wells Borough Council in England. The Conservatives retained control of the council, but with a reduced majority.

== Results summary ==
2019 Tunbridge Wells Borough Council election
Party	This election			Full council			This election		
Party	Seats	Net	Seats %	Other	Total	Total %	Votes	Votes %	+/−
Conservative	5	▼13	27.8	23	28	60.4	7,582	29.1	▼13.7
Liberal Democrats	5	▲5	27.8	4	9	18.8	7,309	28.1	▲5.0
Alliance	5	▲5	27.8	1	6	12.5	4,008	15.4	▲4.7
Labour	2	▲2	10.5	2	4	8.4	3,387	13.0	▼8.5
Independent	1	▲1	5.6	0	1	2.1	1,114	4.3	N/A
UKIP	0	Steady	0.0	0	0	0.0	1,290	5.0	▲4.5
Women's Equality	0	Steady	0.0	0	0	0.0	670	2.6	▲1.4
Green	0	Steady	0.0	0	0	0.0	663	2.5	▲2.3

== Ward results ==
=== Benenden and Cranbrook ===
Benenden and Cranbrook
Party	Candidate	Votes	%	±%
Alliance	Nancy Warne	771	43	N/A
Conservative	Sally-Ann Marks	706	39	−11
Liberal Democrats	Wendy Fitzsimmons	214	12	−12
Labour	Anne Musker	109	6	−3
Majority		65		
Turnout		1,879	36	
Alliance gain from Conservative		Swing		

=== Culverden ===
Culverden
Party	Candidate	Votes	%	±%
Liberal Democrats	James Rands	723	32	+17
Women's Equality	Elizabeth Orr	570	25	N/A
Conservative	Nasir Jamil	560	25	−24
Labour	David Adams	237	11	−4
UKIP	Paul Standing	155	7	−4
Majority		153		
Turnout		2,262	39	
Liberal Democrats gain from Conservative		Swing		

=== Frittenden and Sissinghurst ===
Frittenden and Sissinghurst
Party	Candidate	Votes	%	±%
Conservative	Andrew Fairweather	347	46	±0
Alliance	John Smith	321	43	+14
Liberal Democrats	Brian Guinnessy	80	11	+2
Majority		26		
Turnout		751	45	
Conservative hold		Swing		

=== Goudhurst and Lamberhurst ===
Goudhurst and Lamberhurst
Party	Candidate	Votes	%	±%
Conservative	Linda Hall	505	39	−25
Independent	David Knight	487	38	N/A
Liberal Democrats	Jeremy Stirling	184	14	+3
Labour	Simon Fowler	122	9	−3
Majority		18		
Turnout		1,312	38	
Conservative hold		Swing		

=== Hawkhurst and Sandhurst ===
Hawkhurst and Sandhurst
Party	Candidate	Votes	%	±%
Conservative	Godfrey Bland*	797	55	−5
Liberal Democrats	Helena Waters	545	37	+26
Labour	Ana-Mari Draper	137	8	−3
Majority		252		
Turnout		1,515	32	
Conservative hold		Swing		

=== Paddock Wood East ===
Paddock Wood East
Party	Candidate	Votes	%	±%
Independent	Rodney Atkins	416	43	N/A
Conservative	Sarah Hamilton*	329	34	−20
Independent	William Hills	324	34	N/A
Conservative	Christopher Camp	222	23	−31
Labour	Derek Boyle	126	13	+1
Green	Josephine Wilby	93	10	N/A
Liberal Democrats	Martin Brice	84	9	+1
Labour	Robert Seggie	84	9	−3
Green	Amanda Wells	82	8	N/A
Liberal Democrats	Martin Huebscher	53	5	−3
Majority		5		
Turnout		969	31.5	
Independent gain from Conservative		Swing		
Conservative hold		Swing		

=== Paddock Wood West ===
Paddock Wood West
Party	Candidate	Votes	%	±%
Conservative	Matthew Bailey	289	31	−20
Labour	Raymond Moon	289	31	+10
UKIP	Tracey Goacher	120	13	−8
Green	Trevor Bisdee	119	13	N/A
Liberal Democrats	James Cole	108	12	+5
Majority		0	0	
Turnout		941	33	
Conservative hold		Swing		

=== Pantiles and St. Mark's ===
Pantiles and St. Mark's
Party	Candidate	Votes	%	±%
Liberal Democrats	Andrew Hickey	1,346	60	+47
Conservative	Lawrence Heasman*	554	25	−32
Green	John Hurst	152	7	−3
Women's Equality	Céline Thomas	100	4	N/A
Labour	Patricia Fowlie	93	4	−8
Majority		792	35	
Turnout		2,279	45	
Liberal Democrats gain from Conservative		Swing		

=== Park ===
Park
Party	Candidate	Votes	%	±%
Alliance	Christian Attwood	1,125	50	N/A
Alliance	Rebecca Bruneau	1,088	48	N/A
Conservative	Tracy Moore*	539	24	−30
Liberal Democrats	Rachel Sadler	486	21	+3
Liberal Democrats	Gillian Douglass	482	21	+3
Conservative	Victoria White	437	19	−35
Labour	Linda Jagger	211	9	−7
Independent	Victor Webb	211	9	N/A
UKIP	Michael Jerrom	128	6	−6
Majority		549		
Turnout		2,271	40.7	
Alliance gain from Conservative		Swing		
Alliance gain from Conservative		Swing		

=== Pembury ===
Pembury
Party	Candidate	Votes	%	±%
Alliance	David Hayward	784	44	N/A
Conservative	Susan Nuttall*	484	27	−25
Liberal Democrats	Colin Sefton	165	9	−2
Green	Richard Bayles	125	7	N/A
UKIP	Joel Turner	114	6	−18
Labour	Joel Turner	90	5	−9
Majority		300		
Turnout		1,767	40	
Alliance gain from Conservative		Swing		

=== Rusthall ===
Rusthall
Party	Candidate	Votes	%	±%
Liberal Democrats	David Funnell	547	41	+28
Labour	Bjorn Simpole	346	26	+4
Conservative	David Pate	283	21	−12
UKIP	Alun Elder-Brown	144	11	−6
Majority		153		
Turnout		1,329	37	
Liberal Democrats gain from Conservative		Swing		

=== Sherwood ===
Sherwood
Party	Candidate	Votes	%	±%
Labour	Hugo Pound	517	34	+15
Conservative	Samantha White	506	33	−16
Liberal Democrats	Alan Bullion	268	18	+9
UKIP	Christopher Hoare	233	15	−8
Majority		11		
Turnout		1,541	29	
Labour gain from Conservative		Swing		

=== Southborough and High Brooms ===
Southborough and High Brooms
Party	Candidate	Votes	%	±%
Labour	Luke Everitt	845	50	+14
Liberal Democrats	Alexis Bird	352	21	+11
Conservative	Mark Puller	309	18	−20
UKIP	Christine Marshall	195	11	−5
Majority		493		
Turnout		1,714	32	
Labour gain from Conservative		Swing		

=== Southborough North ===
Southborough North
Party	Candidate	Votes	%	±%
Liberal Democrats	Trevor Poile	691	53	+38
Conservative	David Elliott*	414	31	−27
Labour	Nicholas Blackwell	135	10	−6
UKIP	Stephen Lukacs	76	6	−5
Majority		277		
Turnout		1,322	42	
Liberal Democrats gain from Conservative		Swing		

=== Speldhurst and Bidborough ===
Speldhurst and Bidborough
Party	Candidate	Votes	%	±%
Alliance	Lucinda Willis	1,007	51	N/A
Conservative	John Jukes*	613	31	−33
Liberal Democrats	Iola Palmer-Stirling	351	12	−2
Majority		394		
Turnout		1,990	43	
Alliance gain from Conservative		Swing		

=== St. John's ===
St. John's
Party	Candidate	Votes	%	±%
Liberal Democrats	Marguerita Morton	1,165	59	+34
Conservative	Peter Oakford*	347	18	−23
Green	Benjamin Phillips	174	9	−1
Labour	Louise Reid	154	8	−6
UKIP	Robert Horan	125	6	−5
Majority		818		
Turnout		1,981	39	
Liberal Democrats gain from Conservative		Swing		
