= Hawkenbury, Tunbridge Wells =

Village in Kent, England

Coordinates: 51.123120°N 0.278460°E

Hawkenbury
- Location within Kent
- District: Tunbridge Wells
- Shire county: Kent
- Region: South East
- Country: England
- Sovereign state: United Kingdom
- Post town: Tunbridge Wells
- Postcode district: TN2
- Dialling code: 01892
- Police: Kent
- Fire: Kent
- Ambulance: South East Coast
- UK Parliament: Tunbridge Wells

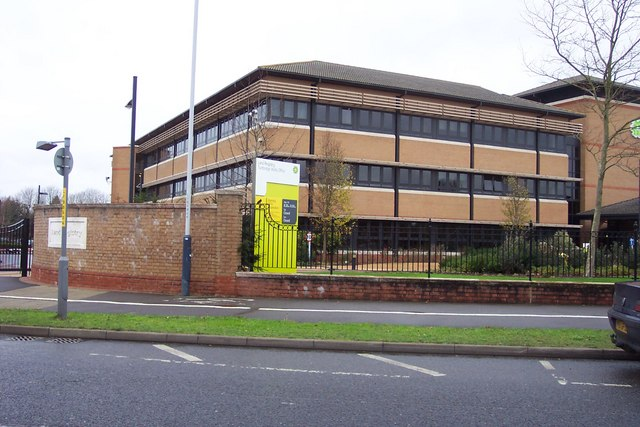
The Tunbridge Wells Land Registry offices were located in Hawkenbury until their closure in June 2011

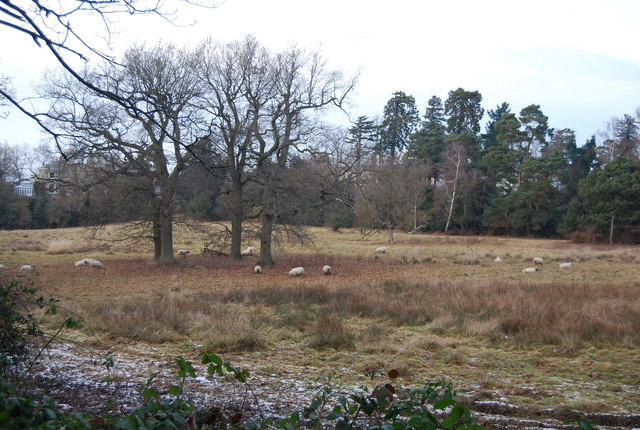
Sheep grazing on the meadow area of Camden Park.

Hawkenbury is a small village area located in the south east of Royal Tunbridge Wells, Kent, England.

== History ==
Hawkenbury was settled before Tunbridge Wells itself was founded in the 17th century, and at one time fell within the parish of Frant, which was divided between Kent and Sussex. It was originally known as "Hockenbury".

Bacon's 1912 map of Tunbridge Wells shows the centre of Hawkenbury lying along Hawkenbury Road, being that area currently lying south of the recreation ground. The Victorian estate around Sibby's Corner was not then considered part of Hawkenbury. Hawkenbury had no less than four places of worship, being a Congregationalist chapel (now United Reformed Church) at Sibby's Corner, a St. Peter's Mission on the junction of Forest Road and Napier Road, an unnamed church on Hawkenbury Road (below the present site of Hawkenbury Mews) and a second Congregationalist chapel lay below the present site of the Hawkenbury Road allotments, as did a number of village dwellings. Beyond agriculture, the residents were employed in the Brickfields, lying due east of present-day Maryland Road. South of Brickfields were a plethora of now-vanished farm buildings, the remains of which can still be traced from the footpath off Chieveley Drive. In 1912 Halls Hole Road was called Marlpits Lane and Whybourne Gate Farm lay on the site of the current Whybourne Crest.

== Governance ==
Hawkenbury is located within the Park ward of Tunbridge Wells, and elects three councillors to Tunbridge Wells Borough Council. Hawkenbury is not part of a parish council (the Borough Council acts as the Parish). Hawkenbury falls under the Tunbridge Wells South district at county level. Hawkenbury is part of the constituency of Tunbridge Wells at a national level. Prior to Brexit in 2020, it was represented by the South East England constituency for the European Union parliament.

== Transport ==
The closest railway station is Tunbridge Wells. Buses serve Hawkenbury from Monday to Saturday, and are provided by Nu-Venture.

== Parks and open spaces ==
Farmcombe Road Open Space is a small open green area. Camden Park contains a pastoral area, known as The Meadow, in the middle of an estate developed by Lord Camden in the mid-19th century. The Hawkenbury Recreation Ground is a large public space that has cricket and football pitches, tennis courts, an all-weather pitch and a children's play area.

There are also allotments in Hawkenbury, in Halls Hole Road, managed by the Hawkenbury Allotment Holders' Association.
