= 2002 Tunbridge Wells Borough Council election =

2002 UK local government election

Results of the 2002 Tunbridge Wells Borough Council election

The 2002 Tunbridge Wells Council election took place on 2 May 2002 to elect members of Tunbridge Wells Borough Council in Kent, England. The whole council was up for election with boundary changes since the last election in 2000. The Conservative Party stayed in overall control of the council.

== Results ==
The results saw the Conservatives increase their majority, while the Labour group leader lost his seat.

Tunbridge Wells local election result 2002
Party	Seats	Gains	Losses	Net gain/loss	Seats %	Votes %	Votes	+/−
Conservative	34			+3	70.8	58.9	33,666	
Liberal Democrats	11			0	22.9	29.3	16,715	
Labour	3			-2	6.3	9.0	5,125	
Green	0			0	0	1.4	828	
Independent	0			-1	0	1.2	661	
UKIP	0			0	0	0.3	150	

=== By ward ===
Benenden and Cranbrook (3)
Party	Candidate	Votes	%	±%
Conservative	Peter Davies	1,014		
Conservative	Tom Veitch	1,012		
Conservative	Linda Hall	863		
Independent	Kim Fletcher	661		
Liberal Democrats	Patricia Hoare	607		
Turnout		4,157	33.7	

Brenchley and Horsmonden (2)
Party	Candidate	Votes	%	±%
Conservative	Paul Oliver-Smith	911		
Conservative	Nicholas Fairrie	870		
Liberal Democrats	Paul Ratcliffe	379		
Turnout		2,160	33.3	

Broadwater (2)
Party	Candidate	Votes	%	±%
Liberal Democrats	Peter Crawford	481		
Conservative	Barbara Cobbold	480		
Liberal Democrats	Andrew Ollive	455		
Conservative	Jennifer Gregory	435		
Turnout		1,851	31.6	

Capel
Party	Candidate	Votes	%	±%
Liberal Democrats	Hugh Patterson	420	63.8	
Conservative	Margaret Pemberton	238	36.2	
Majority		182	27.6	
Turnout		658	37.0	

Culverden (3)
Party	Candidate	Votes	%	±%
Conservative	Leonard Price	804		
Conservative	Eldred Wakefield	800		
Conservative	Wilfred Ekins-Daukes	799		
Liberal Democrats	Aileen Prendergast	523		
Liberal Democrats	Christopher Storr	497		
Green	Brian Leslie	388		
Turnout		3,811	28.1	

Frittenden and Sissinghurst
Party	Candidate	Votes	%	±%
Conservative	John Smith	468	70.8	
Liberal Democrats	Graham Lee	193	29.2	
Majority		275	41.6	
Turnout		661	39.4	

Goudhurst and Lamberhurst (2)
Party	Candidate	Votes	%	±%
Conservative	Barry Noakes	784		
Conservative	John Bullock	728		
Labour	Simon Fowler	269		
Turnout		1,781	31.8	

Hawkhurst and Sandhurst (3)
Party	Candidate	Votes	%	±%
Conservative	John Cunningham	945		
Conservative	Beverley Palmer	912		
Conservative	Ronald Weeden	861		
Liberal Democrats	Keith Brown	504		
Labour	David Burgess	276		
Turnout		3,498	32.3	

Paddock Wood East (2)
Party	Candidate	Votes	%	±%
Conservative	David Marriott	489		
Conservative	Peter Waldock	359		
Liberal Democrats	Lorraine Braam	342		
Labour	Timothy Rich	229		
Turnout		1,419	25.3	

Paddock Wood West (2)
Party	Candidate	Votes	%	±%
Conservative	Elizabeth Thomas	453		
Conservative	Stanley Ward	443		
Labour	Raymond Moon	222		
Liberal Democrats	Walter Stone	217		
Turnout		1,335	25.5	

Pantiles and St Mark's (3)
Party	Candidate	Votes	%	±%
Conservative	James Scholes	1,096		
Conservative	Leonard Horwood	1,017		
Conservative	Gillian Barber-Hughes	1,005		
Liberal Democrats	Michael McDowall	454		
Liberal Democrats	Christopher Wigley	428		
Turnout		4,000	31.3	

Park (3)
Party	Candidate	Votes	%	±%
Conservative	Catherine Mayhew	1,007		
Conservative	Peter Bulman	952		
Conservative	Henry Harrison	928		
Liberal Democrats	Peter Hillier	640		
Liberal Democrats	Alan Bullion	629		
Liberal Democrats	Christopher Skelton	620		
Turnout		4,776	31.7	

Pembury (3)
Party	Candidate	Votes	%	±%
Liberal Democrats	Archibald Ballantine	926		
Conservative	Paul Barrington-King	911		
Liberal Democrats	David Mills	898		
Conservative	Gillian Pavely	818		
Conservative	Richard Harding	789		
Liberal Democrats	Sonya Wratten	687		
Labour	Sally Osborn	182		
Green	Toby Birkett	142		
Green	Barney Richardson	65		
Green	Storm Poorun	50		
Turnout		5,468	42.0	

Rusthall (2)
Party	Candidate	Votes	%	±%
Liberal Democrats	Robert Wratten	530		
Conservative	Barry Edwards	396		
Liberal Democrats	Christopher Gillmore	391		
Conservative	James Perry	385		
Labour	David Kirkham	194		
UKIP	Victor Webb	150		
Turnout		2,046	33.0	

St James' (2)
Party	Candidate	Votes	%	±%
Liberal Democrats	David Neve	803		
Liberal Democrats	Beatrice Lewis	764		
Conservative	Rosemary Fitzherbert	226		
Conservative	Roger Parkes	168		
Labour	David Osborn	123		
Turnout		2,084	30.5	

St John's (3)
Party	Candidate	Votes	%	±%
Liberal Democrats	Alfred Baker	745		
Liberal Democrats	Simon Bannister	742		
Liberal Democrats	Geoffrey Young	664		
Conservative	Sean Lockhart	558		
Conservative	Christopher Reich	543		
Conservative	Christine Dickens	531		
Labour	Peter Ross-Skedd	206		
Green	Phyllis Leslie	183		
Turnout		4,172	30.0	

Sherwood (3)
Party	Candidate	Votes	%	±%
Conservative	Ted Jolley	505		
Conservative	Frank Williams	492		
Conservative	Robert Mayall	456		
Labour	Ian Carvell	445		
Labour	Emma Collins	414		
Labour	John Hopkinson	340		
Liberal Democrats	Cicilia Bannister	321		
Turnout		2,528	23.4	

Southborough and High Brooms (3)
Party	Candidate	Votes	%	±%
Labour	Walter Clary	774		
Labour	Jemima Blackmore	726		
Labour	Ronnie Ooi	725		
Conservative	Colin Bothwell	625		
Conservative	Michael Scott	577		
Conservative	Kevin Wilkinson	514		
Turnout		3,941	26.7	

Southborough North (2)
Party	Candidate	Votes	%	±%
Conservative	Michael Rusbridge	618		
Liberal Democrats	Trevor Poile	545		
Conservative	Pamela Howell	531		
Liberal Democrats	John Billingham	475		
Turnout		2,169	35.5	

Speldhurst and Bidborough (3)
Party	Candidate	Votes	%	±%
Conservative	Melvyn Howell	1,128		
Conservative	Jennifer Paulson-Ellis	1,126		
Conservative	John Jukes	1,096		
Liberal Democrats	Patrick Handcock	420		
Liberal Democrats	Jackie Cassidy	415		
Turnout		4,185	35.5	
