= 2003 Tunbridge Wells Borough Council election =

2003 UK local government election

Results of the 2003 Tunbridge Wells Borough Council election

The 2003 Tunbridge Wells Borough Council election took place on 1 May 2003 to elect members of Tunbridge Wells Borough Council in Kent, England. One third of the council was up for election and the Conservative Party stayed in overall control of the council.

After the election, the composition of the council was:

- Conservative 33
- Liberal Democrat 12
- Labour 3

== Results ==
Tunbridge Wells local election result 2003
Party	Seats	Gains	Losses	Net gain/loss	Seats %	Votes %	Votes	+/−
Conservative	11	0	1	−1	68.8	52.0	10,162	−6.9%
Liberal Democrats	4	1	0	+1	25.0	32.1	6,276	+2.8%
Labour	1	0	0	0	6.3	9.5	1,855	+0.5%
Green	0	0	0	0	0	3.2	617	+1.8%
UKIP	0	0	0	0	0	1.7	325	+1.4%
Independent	0	0	0	0	0	1.5	289	+0.3%

=== By ward ===
Benenden and Cranbrook
Party	Candidate	Votes	%	±%
Conservative	Linda Hall	1,001	62.9	
Liberal Democrats	Winifred Honnywill	459	28.8	
UKIP	Oliver Clement	131	8.2	
Majority		542	34.1	
Turnout		1,591	30.9	−2.8
Conservative hold		Swing		

Culverden
Party	Candidate	Votes	%	±%
Conservative	Wilfred Ekins-Daukes	799	61.2	
Liberal Democrats	Andrew Olive	425	32.6	
Green	Brian Leslie	147	11.3	
Majority		308	28.6	
Turnout		1,305	26.7	−1.4
Conservative hold		Swing		

Frittenden and Sissinghurst
Party	Candidate	Votes	%	±%
Conservative	John Smith	497	74.1	+3.3
Liberal Democrats	Graham Lee	174	25.9	−3.3
Majority		323	48.2	+6.6
Turnout		671	40.4	+1.0
Conservative hold		Swing		

Goudhurst and Lamberhurst
Party	Candidate	Votes	%	±%
Conservative	John Bullock	713	59.0	
Independent	Lesley Peters	289	23.9	
Liberal Democrats	Michael McDowall	207	17.1	
Majority		424	35.1	
Turnout		1,209	37.6	+5.8
Conservative hold		Swing		

Hawkhurst and Sandhurst
Party	Candidate	Votes	%	±%
Conservative	Ronald Weeden	858	64.7	
Liberal Democrats	Keith Brown	360	27.1	
Labour	David Burgess	109	8.2	
Majority		498	37.6	
Turnout		1,327	30.0	−2.3
Conservative hold		Swing		

Paddock Wood East
Party	Candidate	Votes	%	±%
Conservative	Peter Waldock	300	38.0	
Liberal Democrats	Christine Metcalf	284	36.0	
Labour	Raymond Moon	169	21.4	
Green	Susan Peters	36	4.6	
Majority		16	2.0	
Turnout		789	25.1	−0.2
Conservative hold		Swing		

Paddock Wood West
Party	Candidate	Votes	%	±%
Conservative	Stanley Ward	396	57.2	
Liberal Democrats	Lorraine Braam	180	26.0	
Labour	Raymond Steward	116	16.8	
Majority		216	31.2	
Turnout		692	22.9	−2.6
Conservative hold		Swing		

Pantiles and St Marks
Party	Candidate	Votes	%	±%
Conservative	Gillian Barber-Hughes	897	64.3	
Liberal Democrats	Christopher Wigley	401	28.8	
Labour	David Kirkham	96	6.9	
Majority		496	35.5	
Turnout		1,394	29.0	−2.3
Conservative hold		Swing		

Park
Party	Candidate	Votes	%	±%
Conservative	Sean Lockhart	767	48.2	
Liberal Democrats	Alan Bullion	719	45.2	
Labour	Jae Fassam	104	6.5	
Majority		48	3.0	
Turnout		1,590	30.2	−1.5
Conservative hold		Swing		

Pembury
Party	Candidate	Votes	%	±%
Liberal Democrats	David Mills	846	52.4	
Conservative	Gillian Pavely	646	40.0	
Labour	David Osborn	123	7.6	
Majority		200	12.4	
Turnout		1,615	35.4	−6.6
Liberal Democrats hold		Swing		

Rusthall
Party	Candidate	Votes	%	±%
Liberal Democrats	Christopher Gillmore	409	40.7	
Conservative	Barry Edwards	350	34.8	
Labour	Timothy Rich	123	12.2	
UKIP	Patricia Theophanides	83	8.3	
Green	Lucas Howard	41	4.1	
Majority		59	5.9	
Turnout		1,006	25.8	−7.2
Liberal Democrats gain from Conservative		Swing		

St John's
Party	Candidate	Votes	%	±%
Liberal Democrats	Geoffrey Young	633	51.8	
Conservative	Joanne Green	385	31.5	
Labour	Peter Ross-Skedd	127	10.4	
Green	Phyllis Leslie	77	6.3	
Majority		248	20.3	
Turnout		1,222	24.8	−5.2
Liberal Democrats hold		Swing		

Sherwood
Party	Candidate	Votes	%	±%
Conservative	Robert Mayall	447	39.9	
Labour	Ian Carvell	343	30.6	
Liberal Democrats	Cicilia Bannister	269	24.0	
Green	Karen Inglis	61	5.4	
Majority		104	9.3	
Turnout		1,120	22.9	−0.5
Conservative hold		Swing		

Southborough and High Brooms
Party	Candidate	Votes	%	±%
Labour	Oon Ooi	545	41.8	
Conservative	Colin Bothwell	542	41.6	
UKIP	Victor Webb	111	8.5	
Green	Cinda Robinson	105	8.1	
Majority		3	0.2	
Turnout		1,303	25.3	−1.4
Labour hold		Swing		

Southborough North
Party	Candidate	Votes	%	±%
Liberal Democrats	Trevor Poile	577	48.4	
Conservative	Martin Taylor-Smith	553	46.4	
Green	Kim Dale	61	5.1	
Majority		24	2.0	
Turnout		1,191	38.0	
Liberal Democrats hold		Swing		

Speldhurst and Bidborough
Party	Candidate	Votes	%	±%
Conservative	John Jukes	1,011	70.6	
Liberal Democrats	Jacqueline Cassidy	333	23.2	
Green	Allan Peters	89	6.2	
Majority		678	47.4	
Turnout		1,433	32.5	−3.0
Conservative hold		Swing		
