= 1999 Tunbridge Wells Borough Council election =

English local election

The 1999 Tunbridge Wells Borough Council election took place on 6 May 1999 to elect members of Tunbridge Wells Borough Council in Kent, England. One third of the council was up for election and the Conservative party stayed in overall control of the council.

After the election, the composition of the council was

- Conservative 28
- Liberal Democrat 12
- Labour 7
- Independent 1

== Results ==
Tunbridge Wells local election result 1999
Party	Seats	Gains	Losses	Net gain/loss	Seats %	Votes %	Votes	+/−
Conservative	7			+1	43.8			
Liberal Democrats	6			0	37.5			
Labour	3			0	18.8			
Independent	0			-1	0			
