= 2012 Tunbridge Wells Borough Council election =

2012 UK local government election

Map of the results

The 2012 Tunbridge Wells Borough Council election took place on Thursday 3 May 2012 to elect members of Tunbridge Wells Borough Council in Kent, England. One third of the council was up for election.

== Election result ==
Tunbridge Wells local election result 2012
Party	Seats	Gains	Losses	Net gain/loss	Seats %	Votes %	Votes	+/−
Conservative						48.22	14,105	-
Labour						17.60	5,149	
Liberal Democrats						17.43	5,099	
UKIP						12.86	3,761	
Independent						3.15	922	
Green						0.74	216	

== Ward results ==
Benenden and Cranbrook
Party	Candidate	Votes	%	±%
Labour	Stephen Brown	397		
Conservative	Sean Holden			
Majority		1089		
Turnout			29.26	

Brenchley and Horsmonden
Party	Candidate	Votes	%	±%
Labour	Kevin Kerrigan	318		
Conservative	Jane March	917		
Majority				
Turnout			31.74	

Broadwater (2)
Party	Candidate	Votes	%	±%
Labour	Clive Brewer	208		
Conservative	Barbara Cobbold	555		
UKIP	Malcolm Dow	220		
Liberal Democrats	Alex Green	222		
Liberal Democrats	Chris Jeffrey	161		
Labour	Graham Munn	155		
Conservative	Chris Woodward	477		
Turnout			32.84	

Capel
Party	Candidate	Votes	%	±%
Labour	Thomas Devlin	42		
Liberal Democrats	Hugh Patterson	340		
Conservative	Brian Ransley	298		
Majority				
Turnout			38.04	

Culverden
Party	Candidate	Votes	%	±%
Conservative	Ronen Basu	746		
Labour	Veronica Kelly	213		
Green	Richard Leslie	216		
UKIP	Patricia Theophanides	231		
Liberal Democrats	Ian Williams	182		
Majority				
Turnout			29.03	

Goudhurst and Lamberhurst
Party	Candidate	Votes	%	±%
Labour	Simon Fowler	205		
Independent	Edward La Coste	86		
Conservative	Barry Noakes	708		
Majority				
Turnout			30.01	

Hawkhurst and Sandhurst
Party	Candidate	Votes	%	±%
Liberal Democrats	Keith Brown	217		
UKIP	William Orpin	263		
Conservative	Beverley Palmer	717		
Labour	Kim Watts	148		
Majority				
Turnout			29.56	

Pantiles and St Mark’s
Party	Candidate	Votes	%	±%
Labour	Lorna Blackmore	333		
UKIP	Eileen Gayler	194		
Conservative	Len Horwood	1047		
Majority				
Turnout			30.52	

Park
Party	Candidate	Votes	%	±%
Conservative	Peter Bulman	852		
Labour	Nick Maltby	378		
UKIP	June Moore	233		
Liberal Democrats	Rachel Sadler	327		
Majority				
Turnout			33.05	

Pembury (2)
Party	Candidate	Votes	%	±%
Conservative	Paul Barrington-King	736		
Liberal Democrats	Paul Beard	312		
Conservative	Lynn Hine	506		
Labour	Isobel Kerrigan	145		
Labour	Margaret Morgan	229		
UKIP	Colin Nicholson	505		
Independent	Mike Tompsett	836		
Turnout			39.82	

Rusthall
Party	Candidate	Votes	%	±%
Conservative	Bob Atwood	487		
Liberal Democrats	Vic Bethell	103		
Labour	Alex Britcher	263		
UKIP	Piers Wauchope	533		
Majority				
Turnout			38.20	

Sherwood
Party	Candidate	Votes	%	±%
Liberal Democrats	Alan Bullion	123		
Labour	Ian Carvell	261		
UKIP	Christopher Hoare	421		
Conservative	Frank Williams	594		
Majority				
Turnout			29.51	

Southborough and High Brooms
Party	Candidate	Votes	%	±%
Conservative	Nasir Jamil	604		
Labour	Alain Lewis	630		
UKIP	Christine Marshall	193		
Liberal Democrats	Marguerita Morton	96		
Majority				
Turnout			28.80	

Speldhurst and Bidborough
Party	Candidate	Votes	%	±%
Liberal Democrats	Robert Baldock	164		
UKIP	Peter Fasey	221		
Conservative	Julian Stayner	1011		
Labour	Ann Tyler	212		
Majority				
Turnout			34.69	

St James'
Party	Candidate	Votes	%	±%
Liberal Democrats	Ben Chapeland	790		
Labour	Jaimi Lallu	156		
UKIP	Naz Mian	115		
Conservative	James Tansley	213		
Majority				
Turnout			31.95	

St John’s
Party	Candidate	Votes	%	±%
Liberal Democrats	Lesley Herriot	554		
UKIP	Joyce Matthews	148		
Labour	Timothy Rice	244		
Conservative	David Scott	662		
Majority				
Turnout			31.54	
