= 2021 Tunbridge Wells Borough Council election =

Council election

- 6 May 2021

19 out of 48 seats to Tunbridge Wells Borough Council 25 seats needed for a majority
	First party	Second party	Third party
Party	Conservative	Liberal Democrats	Alliance
Seats won	9	7	1
Seats after	24	13	6
Popular vote	13,105	9,524	4,540
Percentage	36.9%	26.8%	12.8%
	Fourth party
Party	Labour
Seats won	2
Seats after	5
Popular vote	5,955
Percentage	16.8%

Map showing the results of the 2021 Tunbridge Wells Borough Council election

The 2021 Tunbridge Wells Borough Council election took place on 6 May 2021 to elect one third of Tunbridge Wells Borough Council in England.

== Results summary ==
2021 Tunbridge Wells Borough Council election
Party	This election			Full council			This election		
Party	Seats	Net	Seats %	Other	Total	Total %	Votes	Votes %	+/−
Conservative	9	▼6	47.4	15	24	50.0	13,105	36.9	+8.3
Liberal Democrats	7	▲4	36.8	6	13	27.1	9,524	26.8	-0.4
Alliance	1	▲1	5.3	5	6	12.5	4,540	12.8	-4.9
Labour	2	▲1	10.5	3	5	10.4	5,955	16.8	+4.7
Green	0	Steady	0.0	0	0	0.0	2,269	6.4	+3.8
UKIP	0	Steady	0.0	0	0	0.0	95	0.3	-4.2
Reform	0	Steady	0.0	0	0	0.0	31	0.1	New

== Ward results ==
=== Benenden and Cranbrook ===
Benenden and Cranbrook
Party	Candidate	Votes	%	±%
Conservative	Sean Holden	989	48.6	−3.8
Alliance	Lee Hatcher	587	28.9	N/A
Liberal Democrats	Thomas Gardner	152	7.5	−15.6
Labour	James Groome	147	7.2	−2.1
Green	John Hurst	128	6.3	N/A
Reform	Toby Stripp	31	1.5	N/A
Majority		402	19.7	
Turnout		2,039	38.7	
Conservative hold		Swing		

=== Brenchley and Horsmonden ===
Brenchley and Horsmonden
Party	Candidate	Votes	%	±%
Conservative	Jane March	838	45.7	−20.3
Alliance	James Spencer	490	26.7	N/A
Labour	Kevin Kerrigan	233	12.7	−7.8
Green	Louise Wilby	161	8.8	N/A
Liberal Democrats	Alexis Bird	111	6.1	N/A
Majority		348	19.0	
Turnout		1,843	44.4	
Conservative hold		Swing		

=== Broadwater ===
Broadwater
Party	Candidate	Votes	%	±%
Liberal Democrats	Christopher Hall	460	33.7	+21.6
Conservative	Barbara Cobbold	419	30.7	−24.2
Green	Adrian Thorne	361	26.4	N/A
Labour	Marcus Chapman	94	6.9	−9.4
UKIP	Alun Elder-Brown	31	2.3	−14.5
Majority		41	3.0	
Turnout		1,369	41.9	
Liberal Democrats gain from Conservative		Swing		

=== Capel ===
Capel
Party	Candidate	Votes	%	±%
Liberal Democrats	Hugh Patterson	717	75.2	+37.2
Conservative	Carol MacKonochie	187	19.6	−28.0
Green	Christine Spicer	17	1.8	N/A
Labour	Wendy Day	16	1.7	−3.3
UKIP	Christopher Hoare	16	1.7	−7.7
Majority		530	55.6	
Turnout		957	53.4	
Liberal Democrats gain from Conservative		Swing		

=== Culverden ===
Culverden
Party	Candidate	Votes	%	±%
Liberal Democrats	Justine Rutland	1,349	53.7	+40.5
Conservative	Maryna Cole	829	33.0	−11.0
Labour	Lucia Cligaris-Adams	333	13.3	−6.2
Majority		520	20.7	
Turnout		2,533	41.0	
Liberal Democrats gain from Conservative		Swing		

=== Goudhurst and Lamberhurst ===
Goudhurst and Lamberhurst
Party	Candidate	Votes	%	±%
Alliance	David Knight	641	40.0	N/A
Conservative	Colin Noakes	613	38.2	−22.3
Labour	Simon Fowler	133	8.3	−5.1
Green	Geoffrey Mason	119	7.4	N/A
Liberal Democrats	Quentin Rappoport	97	6.1	−5.8
Majority		28	1.8	
Turnout		1,607	45.1	
Alliance gain from Conservative		Swing		

=== Hawkhurst and Sandhurst ===
Hawkhurst and Sandhurst
Party	Candidate	Votes	%	±%
Conservative	Beverley Palmer	1,100	58.2	+0.5
Alliance	Ellen Neville	403	21.3	N/A
Labour	Ana-Mari Draper	158	8.4	−2.7
Green	Johanna Williamson	130	6.9	N/A
Liberal Democrats	Brian Guinnessy	99	5.2	−4.5
Majority		697	36.9	
Turnout		1,894	38.6	
Conservative hold		Swing		

=== Paddock Wood West ===
Paddock Wood West
Party	Candidate	Votes	%	±%
Conservative	William Hills	461	38.6	
Labour	Raymond Moon	369	30.9	
Green	Trevor Bisdee	304	25.5	
Liberal Democrats	James Cole	59	4.9	
Majority		92	7.7	
Turnout		1,202	40.6	
Conservative hold		Swing		

=== Pantiles and St. Mark's ===
Pantiles and St. Mark's
Party	Candidate	Votes	%	±%
Liberal Democrats	Wendy Fitzsimmons	1,259	48.1	+35.8
Conservative	Liam Randall	946	36.1	−19.4
Green	Evelien Hurst-Buist	228	8.7	+1.6
Labour	Jemima Blackmore	184	7.0	−6.6
Majority		313	12.0	
Turnout		2,629	50.3	
Liberal Democrats gain from Conservative		Swing		

=== Park ===
Park
Party	Candidate	Votes	%	±%
Conservative	Victoria White	887	35.7	−15.1
Alliance	Suzanne Wakeman	632	25.4	N/A
Liberal Democrats	Anne Sillivan	414	16.7	−1.1
Labour	Susan Pound	332	13.4	−5.3
Green	Alasdair Fraser	219	8.8	N/A
Majority		255	10.3	
Turnout		2,501	43.0	
Conservative hold		Swing		

=== Pembury ===
Pembury
Party	Candidate	Votes	%	±%
Conservative	Paul Roberts	907	46.2	−8.1
Alliance	Angela Ward	675	34.4	N/A
Labour	Paul Webster	208	10.6	−3.8
Liberal Democrats	Yvonne Raptis	173	8.8	−1.9
Majority		232	11.8	
Turnout		1,972	44.3	
Conservative hold		Swing		

=== Rusthall ===
Rusthall
Party	Candidate	Votes	%	±%
Labour	Katherine Britcher-Allan	572	35.7	+18.8
Conservative	James Allen	455	28.4	−14.3
Liberal Democrats	Angela Funnell	436	27.2	+17.2
Green	Aimee Taylor	141	8.8	+1.0
Majority		117	7.3	
Turnout		1,613	43.9	
Labour gain from Conservative		Swing		

=== Sherwood ===
Sherwood
Party	Candidate	Votes	%	±%
Conservative	Lance Goodship	960	50.7	+4.6
Labour	Shadi Rogers	724	38.2	+19.8
Liberal Democrats	Alan Bullion	211	11.1	+3.4
Majority		236	12.5	
Turnout		1,920	38.5	
Conservative hold		Swing		

=== Southborough and High Brooms ===
Southborough and High Brooms
Party	Candidate	Votes	%	±%
Labour Co-op	Dianne Hill	1,033	52.5	+0.2
Conservative	Nasir Jamil	576	29.3	+3.8
Liberal Democrats	Aqab Malik	162	8.2	+3.0
Green	Anthony Hoskin	150	7.6	+2.0
UKIP	Christine Marshall	48	2.4	−8.9
Majority		457	23.2	
Turnout		1,994	36.1	
Labour Co-op hold		Swing		

=== Speldhurst and Bidborough ===
Speldhurst and Bidborough
Party	Candidate	Votes	%	±%
Conservative	Harry Allen	912	39.4	−30.3
Conservative	David Stanyer	860	37.2	−32.5
Alliance	Matthew Sankey	626	27.1	N/A
Alliance	Anne Backshell	486	21.0	N/A
Green	Clare Himmer	311	13.4	N/A
Liberal Democrats	Jeremy Stirling	290	12.5	N/A
Liberal Democrats	Martin Brice	246	10.6	N/A
Labour	Millie Gray	176	7.6	−9.7
Labour	Anne Musker	174	7.5	−9.8
Turnout		2,313	49.3	
Conservative hold		Swing		
Conservative hold		Swing		

=== St. James ===
St. James
Party	Candidate	Votes	%	±%
Liberal Democrats	Benjamin Chapelard	1,231	68.0	−3.2
Liberal Democrats	Robert Wormington	920	50.8	−20.4
Conservative	Thelma Huggett	295	16.3	+4.3
Conservative	Alexander Lewis-Grey	285	15.7	+3.7
Labour	Rosanagh Mockett	258	14.2	+4.3
Labour	Alexander Klimanski	219	12.1	+2.2
Turnout		1,811	41.5	
Liberal Democrats hold		Swing		
Liberal Democrats hold		Swing		

=== St. John's ===
St. John's
Party	Candidate	Votes	%	±%
Liberal Democrats	Peter Lidstone	1,138	49.2	+5.9
Labour	Michael Tapp	592	25.6	+11.6
Conservative	Thomas Clowes-Pritchard	583	25.2	−4.3
Majority		546	23.6	
Turnout		2,336	44.7	
Liberal Democrats hold		Swing		

== By-elections ==
=== Speldhurst & Bidborough ===
Speldhurst & Bidborough: 25 November 2021
Party	Candidate	Votes	%	±%
Alliance	Matthew Sankey	788	49.8	+22.7
Conservative	Rowena Stanyer	730	46.1	+6.7
Labour	Aleksander Klimanski	65	4.1	−3.5
Majority		58	3.7	N/A
Turnout		1,587	34.7	
Alliance gain from Conservative		Swing	▲8.0	

The Speldhurst and Bidborough by-election was triggered by the death of Conservative councillor Julian Stanyer.
