= 2023 Tunbridge Wells Borough Council election =

2023 English local election

- 4 May 2023

16 out of 48 seats to Tunbridge Wells Borough Council 25 seats needed for a majority
- Turnout: 37.1%

	First party	Second party	Third party
Leader	Ben Chapelard	Tom Dawlings	David Hayward
Party	Liberal Democrats	Conservative	Alliance
Last election	17 seats, 22.4%	15 seats, 32.1%	9 seats, 21.5%
Seats before	15	13	9
Seats won	5	2	5
Seats after	17	11	11
Seat change	Steady	▼2	Steady
Popular vote	6,733	7,808	4,804
Percentage	25.3%	29.4%	18.1%
Swing	▲2.9%	▼2.7%	▼3.4%
	Fourth party	Fifth party
Leader	Hugo Pound
Party	Labour	Independent
Last election	7 seats, 19.6%	N/A
Seats before	7	4
Seats won	3	1
Seats after	8	1
Seat change	▲1	Steady
Popular vote	4,330	640
Percentage	16.3%	2.4%
Swing	▼3.3%	N/A
- Winner of each seat at the 2023 Tunbridge Wells Borough Council election
Leader before election
Ben Chapelard
Liberal Democrat
No overall control
Leader after election
Ben Chapelard
Liberal Democrat
No overall control

The 2023 Tunbridge Wells Borough Council election took place on 4 May 2023 to elect members of Tunbridge Wells Borough Council in Kent, England. This was on the same day as other local elections across England.

The council's detailed declarations recorded 26,575 ballot papers issued from an electorate of 71,657, an overall turnout of 37.1%.

The council remained under no overall control, being led by a coalition of the Liberal Democrats, local party the Tunbridge Wells Alliance, Labour and an independent councillor, led by Ben Chapelard of the Liberal Democrats. The council remained under no overall control after the election and continued to be run by the same coalition.

== Summary ==
=== Election result ===
2023 Tunbridge Wells Borough Council election
Party	This election			Full council			This election		
Party	Seats	Net	Seats %	Other	Total	Total %	Votes	Votes %	+/−
Liberal Democrats	5	Steady	31.0	12	17	35.4	6,733	25.3	+2.9
Conservative	2	▼2	12.5	9	11	22.9	7,808	29.4	–2.7
Alliance	5	▲1	31.0	6	11	18.8	4,804	18.1	–3.4
Labour	3	▲1	18.8	5	8	16.7	4,330	16.3	–3.3
Independent	1	Steady	6.3	2	3	6.3	640	2.4	N/A
Green	0	Steady	0	0	0	0	2,177	8.2	+4.2
Reform	0	Steady	0	0	0	0	83	0.3	N/A

== Ward results ==
The Statement of Persons Nominated, which details the candidates standing in each ward, was released by Tunbridge Wells Borough Council following the close of nominations on 5 April 2023. The results were as follows:

=== Benenden and Cranbrook ===
Benenden and Cranbrook
Party	Candidate	Votes	%	±%
Alliance	Nancy Warne*	723	42.9	▲4.9
Conservative	John Austen	619	36.7	▼6.4
Labour	Lorna Blackmore	120	7.1	▼2.7
Green	Rachael Mason	116	6.9	▼2.2
Liberal Democrats	Michael Gill	109	6.5	N/A
Majority		104	6.2	▲1.1
Turnout		1,687	32.3	▼1.5
Registered electors		5,221		
Alliance hold		Swing	▲5.7	

=== Culverden ===
Culverden
Party	Candidate	Votes	%	±%
Liberal Democrats	David Osborne	1,104	51.5	▼3.1
Conservative	Chris Woodward	580	27.1	▼3.3
Green	Michael Calvert	249	11.6	N/A
Labour	Adrian Farnham	210	9.8	▼1.7
Majority		524	24.4	▲0.2
Turnout		2,143	34.7	▼4.3
Registered electors		6,173		
Liberal Democrats hold		Swing	▲3.2	

=== Frittenden and Sissinghurst ===
Frittenden and Sissinghurst
Party	Candidate	Votes	%	±%
Conservative	Andy Fairweather*	429	67.0	▲20.8
Green	John Hurst	82	12.8	N/A
Liberal Democrats	Angela Funnell	75	11.7	▼1.0
Alliance	Janis Smith	54	8.4	▼34.3
Majority		347	54.2	▲50.7
Turnout		640	35.5	▼9.1
Registered electors		1,805		
Conservative hold		Swing	▲27.6	

=== Goudhurst and Lamberhurst ===
Goudhurst and Lamberhurst
Party	Candidate	Votes	%	±%
Alliance	Alison Webster	520	41.6	▲1.6
Conservative	Beckie Winter	291	23.3	▼14.9
Green	Geoff Mason	272	21.7	▲14.3
Liberal Democrats	John Rappoport	96	7.7	▲1.6
Labour	Anne Musker	72	5.8	▼2.5
Majority		229	18.3	
Turnout		1,251	35.4	
Registered electors		3,533		
Alliance gain from Conservative		Swing		

=== Hawkhurst and Sandhurst ===
Hawkhurst and Sandhurst
Party	Candidate	Votes	%	±%
Conservative	Godfrey Bland*	800	48.1	▲6.7
Alliance	Heidi Eccles	291	17.5	▼30.6
Liberal Democrats	Mike Appelbe	230	13.8	N/A
Labour	Ana Draper	159	9.6	▼0.9
Green	Debs Keech	100	6.0	N/A
Reform	Simon Hilton	83	5.0	N/A
Majority		509	30.6	
Turnout		1,663	33.6	
Registered electors		4,954		
Conservative hold		Swing		

=== Paddock Wood East ===
Paddock Wood East
Party	Candidate	Votes	%	±%
Independent	Rodney Atkins*	391	35.9	N/A
Conservative	Nicolas Maari	309	28.4	▼4.1
Independent	Matthew Bailey*	178	16.4	N/A
Labour	Andrew Muir	108	9.9	▼4.6
Green	Penny Peerless	58	5.3	▲0.3
Liberal Democrats	Brian Guinnessy	44	4.0	N/A
Majority		82	7.5	
Turnout		1,088	32.4	
Registered electors		3,360		
Independent hold		Swing		

=== Paddock Wood West ===
Paddock Wood West
Party	Candidate	Votes	%	±%
Liberal Democrats	Mark Munday	438	40.4	▲35.8
Conservative	Tom Mobbs	354	32.7	▲5.3
Green	Trevor Bisdee	221	20.4	▲8.3
Independent	Linda Store	71	6.5	N/A
Majority		84	7.7	
Turnout		1,084	35.2	
Registered electors		3,077		
Liberal Democrats gain from Conservative		Swing		

=== Pantiles and St Mark's ===
Pantiles and St Mark's
Party	Candidate	Votes	%	±%
Liberal Democrats	Pamela Wilkinson	1,250	54.0	▼4.4
Conservative	David Scott	758	32.8	▲2.7
Labour	Alan Bullionn	158	6.8	▲1.3
Green	Jack Mason	147	6.4	▲0.8
Majority		492	21.2	
Turnout		2,313	43.4	
Registered electors		5,327		
Liberal Democrats hold		Swing		

=== Park ===
Park
Party	Candidate	Votes	%	±%
Alliance	Siobhan O'Connell	868	38.7	▲1.7
Conservative	Christian Atwood*	616	27.5	▼5.0
Liberal Democrats	Jules Luxford	332	14.8	▼3.1
Labour	Sue Pound	264	11.8	▼0.8
Green	Alasdair Fraser	162	7.2	N/A
Majority		252	11.2	
Turnout		2,242	38.1	
Registered electors		5,890		
Alliance hold		Swing		

=== Pembury ===
Pembury
Party	Candidate	Votes	%	±%
Alliance	David Hayward*	922	51.3	▲8.5
Conservative	Vivek Gautam	529	29.4	▼16.7
Liberal Democrats	Eugenie Ballara	122	6.8	N/A
Labour	Joel Turner	115	6.4	▼4.7
Green	Evelien Hurst-Buist	109	6.1	N/A
Majority		393	21.9	
Turnout		1,797	41.0	
Registered electors		4,388		
Alliance hold		Swing		

=== Rusthall ===
Rusthall
Party	Candidate	Votes	%	±%
Labour	Jayne Sharratt	627	41.5	▲5.8
Liberal Democrats	Dave Funnell*	533	35.3	▲8.1
Conservative	James Allen	266	17.6	▼10.8
Green	Aimee Taylor	86	5.7	▼3.1
Majority		94	6.2	
Turnout		1,512	42.3	
Registered electors		3,572		
Labour gain from Liberal Democrats		Swing		

=== Sherwood ===
Sherwood
Party	Candidate	Votes	%	±%
Labour	Hugo Pound*	643	37.3	▼16.1
Conservative	Nasir Jamil	545	31.6	▼15.0
Liberal Democrats	Andrew Elliott	235	13.6	N/A
Alliance	Joseph Dore	210	12.2	N/A
Green	Lee MacKinnon	89	5.2	N/A
Majority		98	5.7	
Turnout		1,722	29.9	
Registered electors		5,756		
Labour hold		Swing		

=== Southborough and High Brooms ===
Southborough and High Brooms
Party	Candidate	Votes	%	±%
Labour	John Francis	933	53.8	▼6.5
Conservative	Misha Mitchem	305	17.6	▼7.9
Alliance	Paul Johnson	169	9.7	N/A
Liberal Democrats	Yvonne Raptis	165	9.5	▼4.7
Green	David Holton	162	9.3	N/A
Majority		628	36.2	
Turnout		1,734	31.6	
Registered electors		5,488		
Labour hold		Swing		

=== Southborough North ===
Southborough North
Party	Candidate	Votes	%	±%
Liberal Democrats	Joe Opara	619	41.9	▼1.9
Conservative	Sarah Bridges	478	32.4	▼9.6
Alliance	Jonathan Farina	163	11.0	N/A
Labour	Martin Betts	143	9.7	▼4.4
Green	Sue Lovell	73	4.9	N/A
Majority		141	9.5	
Turnout		1,476	44.3	
Registered electors		3,333		
Liberal Democrats hold		Swing		

=== Speldhurst and Bidborough ===
Speldhurst and Bidborough
Party	Candidate	Votes	%	±%
Alliance	Paul Curry	884	42.1	▼22.5
Conservative	Aaron Brand	608	29.0	▲0.7
Liberal Democrats	Rebecca Leach	363	17.3	N/A
Green	Steph Gandon	136	6.5	N/A
Labour	Paul Froome	108	5.1	▼2.0
Majority		276	13.1	
Turnout		2,099	45.8	
Registered electors		4,578		
Alliance hold		Swing		

=== St John's ===
St John's
Party	Candidate	Votes	%	±%
Liberal Democrats	Marguerita Morton*	1,018	47.9	▲6.6
Labour	Dariel Francis	670	31.5	▼9.6
Conservative	Alexander Puffette	321	15.1	▼2.4
Green	Adrian Thorne	115	5.4	N/A
Majority		348	16.4	
Turnout		2,124	40.8	
Registered electors		5,202		
Liberal Democrats hold		Swing		

== Changes 2023–2024 ==
Labour councillor Raymond Moon was suspended from the party in July 2023. David Hayward, elected for the Tunbridge Wells Alliance, left the party (of which he had been the leader) in August 2023 to form a new independent group.
