= 2026 Tunbridge Wells Borough Council election =

Local election in Kent, England

- 7 May 2026

15 out of 39 seats to Tunbridge Wells Borough Council (including 2 by-elections) 20 seats needed for a majority
- Turnout: 45.3%
	First party	Second party	Third party
Leader	Ben Chapelard	Tom Dawlings
Party	Liberal Democrats	Conservative	Alliance
Last election	22 seats, 34.2%	7 seats, 29.3%	4 seats, 8.8%
Seats before	22	8	3
Seats won	11	2	1
Seats after	25	7	3
Seat change	▲3	▼1	Steady
Popular vote	16,658	10,235	1,563
Percentage	37.9%	23.3%	3.6%
Swing	▲3.7%	▼6.0%	▼5.2%
	Fourth party	Fifth party
Leader	Hugo Pound
Party	Labour	IfTW
Last election	5 seats, 14.3%	1 seat, 5.9%
Seats before	5	1
Seats won	0	1
Seats after	3	1
Seat change	▼2	Steady
Popular vote	1,043	934
Percentage	2.4%	2.1%
Swing	▼11.9%	N/A
- Winner of each seat at the 2026 Tunbridge Wells Borough Council election.
Leader before election
Ben Chapelard
Liberal Democrats
Leader after election
Ben Chapelard
Liberal Democrats

The 2026 Tunbridge Wells Borough Council election was held on 7 May 2026, alongside the other local elections across the United Kingdom being held on the same day, to elect 15 of 39 members of Tunbridge Wells Borough Council in Kent, England.

The council remained under Liberal Democrat majority control.

Due to ongoing local government reorganisation, this will be the final election to Tunbridge Wells Borough Council before it is abolished and replaced by the new unitary authority for West Kent. Elections to the shadow authority are due to take place on 6 May 2027, with the new council assuming its full responsibilities from April 2028.

== Summary ==
=== Background ===
In 2024, the Liberal Democrats took control of the council.

=== Council composition ===
After 2024 election		Before 2026 election	
Party	Seats	Party	Seats
Liberal Democrats	22	Liberal Democrats	22
Conservative	7	Conservative	8
Labour	5	Labour	5
Alliance	4	Alliance	3
IfTW	1	IfTW	1

=== Election result ===
The council published detailed results for each ward and reported borough-wide turnout of 45.3%.

2026 Tunbridge Wells Borough Council election
Party	This election				Full council			This election		
Party	Candidates	Seats	Net	Seats %	Other	Total	Total %	Votes	Votes %	+/−
Liberal Democrats	15	11	▲3	73.3	14	25	64.1	16,658	37.9	+3.7
Conservative	15	2	▼1	13.3	5	7	17.9	10,235	23.3	–6.0
Alliance	3	1	Steady	6.7	2	3	7.7	1,563	3.6	–5.2
Labour	8	0	▼2	0.0	3	3	7.7	1,043	2.4	–11.9
IfTW	1	1	Steady	6.7	0	1	2.6	934	2.1	N/A
Reform	15	0	Steady	0.0	0	0	0.0	9,277	21.1	+20.0
Green	14	0	Steady	0.0	0	0	0.0	4,144	9.4	+2.9
English Democrat	1	0	Steady	0.0	0	0	0.0	62	0.1	N/A
Independent	1	0	Steady	0.0	0	0	0.0	27	0.1	N/A

== Incumbents ==
Ward	Incumbent councillor	Party	Re-standing
Cranbrook, Sissinghurst & Frittenden	David Somers	Conservative	No
Culverden	David Osborne	Liberal Democrats	Yes
Hawkhurst, Sandhurst & Benenden	Ellen Neville	Alliance	Yes
Paddock Wood	Adrian Pitts	Liberal Democrats	No
Pantiles	Pamela Wilkinson	Liberal Democrats	Yes
Park	Richard Brown (Note: Elected at the 2025 Park by-election.)	Liberal Democrats	Yes
Pembury & Capel	David Hayward	IfTW	Yes
Rural Tunbridge Wells	David Knight	Conservative	Yes
Rusthall & Speldhurst	Alex Britcher-Allan	Labour	No
Sherwood	Christian Atwood	Conservative	Yes
Southborough & Bidborough	Joe Opara	Liberal Democrats	No
St James	Courtney Souper	Liberal Democrats	Yes (Note: Standing in Sherwood ward.)
St John's	Ukonu Obasi (Note: Elected at the 2025 St John's by-election.)	Liberal Democrats	No

== Candidates ==
=== Cranbrook, Sissinghurst & Frittenden ===
Cranbrook, Sissinghurst & Frittenden
Party	Candidate	Votes	%	±%
Conservative	Alexander Ellison	1,227	46.2	+12.8
Reform	Matthew Beattie	674	25.4	N/A
Liberal Democrats	Vivian Widgery	384	14.5	+7.3
Green	Paul Froome	370	13.9	+0.8
Majority		553	20.8	N/A
Turnout		2,655	45.6	+14.3
Registered electors		5,823		
Conservative hold				

=== Culverden ===
Culverden
Party	Candidate	Votes	%	±%
Liberal Democrats	David Osborne*	1,402	49.5	+6.1
Conservative	Robert George Alexander Dunn	685	24.2	–1.9
Reform	Tina Seymour	406	14.3	N/A
Green	Mark McBennett	230	8.1	–4.2
Labour	Aleksander Klimanski	85	3.0	–9.1
Independent	Ahsan Azam Ahmad	27	1.0	–5.1
Majority		717	25.3	N/A
Turnout		2,835	44.7	+7.1
Registered electors		6,339		
Liberal Democrats hold		Swing	▲4.0	

=== Hawkhurst, Sandhurst & Benenden ===
Hawkhurst, Sandhurst & Benenden
Party	Candidate	Votes	%	±%
Alliance	Ellen Neville*	943	31.7	+3.8
Conservative	Rosanna Taylor-Smith	894	30.0	–1.1
Reform	John Spence	767	25.8	+17.3
Liberal Democrats	Michael Edward Appelbe	373	12.5	+3.5
Majority		49	1.7	N/A
Turnout		2,977	45.6	+11.6
Registered electors		6,534		
Alliance hold		Swing	▲2.5	

=== Paddock Wood ===
Paddock Wood
Party	Candidate	Votes	%	±%
Liberal Democrats	Christopher Digby	1,195	39.4	+9.2
Reform	Begnat Robichaud	882	29.1	N/A
Conservative	Lynne Scott	749	24.7	–2.3
Green	Trevor Bisdee	207	6.8	–5.0
Majority		313	10.3	N/A
Turnout		3,033	43.0	+8.6
Registered electors		7,052		
Liberal Democrats hold				

=== Pantiles ===
Pantiles
Party	Candidate	Votes	%	±%
Liberal Democrats	Pamela Wilkinson*	1,246	41.0	+0.5
Conservative	Daniel Dzenkowski	931	30.6	+7.2
Reform	Kris Niewolski	531	17.5	+10.4
Green	Joe Mattei	232	7.6	–3.8
Labour	Frankel Nutland	100	3.3	–8.1
Majority		315	10.4	N/A
Turnout		3,040	44.9	+8.0
Registered electors		6,770		
Liberal Democrats hold		Swing	▼3.4	

=== Park ===
Park
Party	Candidate	Votes	%	±%
Liberal Democrats	Richard Brown*	1,515	48.2	+15.9
Reform	Mike Jerrom	523	16.6	+11.0
Conservative	David Scott	497	15.8	–3.7
Alliance	Nick Pope	268	8.5	–14.0
Green	Alasdair Fraser	250	8.0	–3.3
Labour	Stephen Burgess	91	2.9	–5.9
Majority		992	31.6	N/A
Turnout		3,144	46.6	+4.4
Registered electors		6,748		
Liberal Democrats hold		Swing	▲2.5	

=== Pembury & Capel ===
Pembury & Capel
Party	Candidate	Votes	%	±%
IfTW	David Hayward*	934	29.7	–0.3
Liberal Democrats	Niccholas Slessor-Pavely	916	29.2	–4.2
Reform	Val Dachille	659	21.0	N/A
Conservative	Andrew Hobart	466	14.8	–9.4
Green	Sue Lovell	167	5.3	–1.6
Majority		18	0.5	N/A
Turnout		3,142	47.3	+5.8
Registered electors		6,649		
IfTW hold		Swing	▲2.0	

=== Rural Tunbridge Wells ===
Rural Tunbridge Wells
Party	Candidate	Votes	%	±%
Conservative	David Knight*	1,474	37.4	+7.4
Liberal Democrats	Susan Hindle-Barone	1,131	28.7	+18.1
Reform	Dennis Deane	987	25.1	N/A
Green	Helen Yeo	274	7.0	–8.4
Labour	Anne Musker	73	1.9	–6.8
Majority		343	8.7	N/A
Turnout		3,939	49.8	+14.7
Registered electors		7,902		
Conservative hold		Swing	▼5.4	

=== Rusthall & Speldhurst ===
Rusthall & Speldhurst
Party	Candidate	Votes	%	±%
Liberal Democrats	Ian Standing	1,192	34.1	+15.2
Conservative	David Sumner	717	20.5	+4.0
Reform	Rob Grindley	655	18.7	+14.4
Alliance	Kit Hawes-Webb	352	10.1	–14.2
Labour	Greg Holder	317	9.1	–15.9
Green	Stephanie Gandon	264	7.5	+0.7
Majority		475	13.6	N/A
Turnout		3,497	48.2	+3.9
Registered electors		7,260		
Liberal Democrats gain from Labour		Swing	▲5.6	

=== Sherwood ===
Sherwood (2 seats due to by-election)
Party	Candidate	Votes	%	±%
Liberal Democrats	Courtney Souper*	847	36.4	+24.8
Liberal Democrats	Andrew Wallace	787	33.8	+23.6
Reform	Chris Hoare	592	25.4	N/A
Reform	Oliver Kinkade	549	23.6	N/A
Conservative	Christian Atwood*	453	19.5	–17.6
Green	Kate Sergeant	445	19.1	+6.9
Green	Eben Phoebe	420	18.1	N/A
Conservative	Ellis Wiggins	384	16.5	–20.0
Labour	Tina Kesterton	176	7.6	–31.6
Turnout		~2,327	36.0	+6.9
Registered electors		6,467		
Liberal Democrats gain from Conservative				
Liberal Democrats gain from Labour				

The Sherwood ward returned two councillors because a second seat was vacant following the resignation of Labour councillor Vic Jones before the election.

=== Southborough & Bidborough ===
Southborough & Bidborough (2 seats due to by-election)
Party	Candidate	Votes	%	±%
Liberal Democrats	Kimberley Johnson	1,614	49.0	+13.4
Liberal Democrats	Ash Shukla	1,531	46.5	+11.7
Reform	Steven Humphreys	719	21.8	N/A
Reform	Robert Mayall	675	20.5	N/A
Conservative	Richard Long	652	19.8	–6.9
Conservative	Jack Bradley	615	18.7	–7.9
Green	Maria Gavin	435	13.2	+4.0
Green	Iqbal Sidhu	280	8.5	N/A
English Democrat	Aaron James Brand	62	1.9	N/A
Turnout		~3,292	44.3	+3.6
Registered electors		7,437		
Liberal Democrats hold				
Liberal Democrats hold				

The Southborough & Bidborough ward returned two councillors because a second seat was vacant following the resignation of Liberal Democrat councillor Brendon Le Page before the election.

=== St James ===
St James
Party	Candidate	Votes	%	±%
Liberal Democrats	Gavin Barrass	1,478	57.7	+10.3
Reform	Philip Dwyer	365	14.3	N/A
Green	Lucy Miller	316	12.3	–1.7
Conservative	George Barr	271	10.6	+2.1
Labour	Nick Maltby	130	5.1	–8.5
Majority		1,113	43.4	N/A
Turnout		2,560	42.4	+6.6
Registered electors		6,042		
Liberal Democrats hold				

=== St John's ===
St John's
Party	Candidate	Votes	%	±%
Liberal Democrats	Ukonu Obasi*	1,047	55.5	+6.5
Reform	Chris Pendleton	293	15.5	N/A
Green	Lewis Patrick Jenkins	254	13.5	+6.4
Conservative	Alexander Lewis-Grey	220	11.7	–1.0
Labour	Lorna Blackmore	71	3.8	–21.8
Majority		754	40.0	N/A
Turnout		1,885	45.2	+4.8
Registered electors		4,171		
Liberal Democrats hold				

== Post-election changes ==
=== Cranbrook, Sissinghurst & Frittenden by-election ===
Cranbrook, Sissinghurst & Frittenden by-election, 23 September 2026
Party	Candidate	Votes	%	±%
Liberal Democrats	Harry Wormington	697	37.4	+22.9
Conservative	Nicholas Lees	590	31.6	−14.6
Reform	David Somers	392	21.0	−4.4
Green	Max Chesters	186	10.0	−4.0
Majority		107	5.8	−15.0
Turnout		1865	32.0	−13.6
Liberal Democrats gain from Alliance		Swing		
