= 2008 Tunbridge Wells Borough Council election =

2008 UK local government election

Results of the 2008 Tunbridge Wells Borough Council election

The 2008 Tunbridge Wells Borough Council election took place on 1 May 2008 to elect members of Tunbridge Wells Borough Council in Kent, England. One third of the council was up for election and the Conservative Party stayed in overall control of the council.

After the election, the composition of the council was:

- Conservative 44
- Liberal Democrat 4

== Election result ==
The results saw the Conservatives retain control after gaining 3 seats from the Liberal Democrats to have 44 seats compared to 4 for the Liberal Democrats.

Tunbridge Wells local election result 2008
Party	Seats	Gains	Losses	Net gain/loss	Seats %	Votes %	Votes	+/−
Conservative	15	3	0	+3	93.8	56.8	12,756	−0.4%
Liberal Democrats	1	0	3	−3	6.3	26.7	5,994	−1.2%
UKIP	0	0	0	0	0	5.0	1,121	−1.3%
Labour	0	0	0	0	0	4.8	1,077	−1.1%
Green	0	0	0	0	0	4.1	913	+2.1%
Independent	0	0	0	0	0	2.7	599	+2.0%

== Ward results ==
Benenden and Cranbrook
Party	Candidate	Votes	%	±%
Conservative	Sean Holden	836	41.3	−17.2
Independent	Peter Jempson	599	29.6	+29.6
Liberal Democrats	Francis Rook	522	25.8	−9.0
UKIP	Oliver Clement	67	3.3	−3.4
Majority		237	11.7	−12.0
Turnout		2,024	38.7	−0.2
Conservative hold		Swing		

Brenchley and Horsmonden
Party	Candidate	Votes	%	±%
Conservative	Marcella Callow	1,011	62.4	−16.7
Liberal Democrats	Isobel Kerrigan	608	37.6	+16.7
Majority		403	24.9	−33.3
Turnout		1,619	42.4	+4.8
Conservative hold		Swing		

Broadwater
Party	Candidate	Votes	%	±%
Conservative	Barbara Cobbold	637	68.4	+23.8
Liberal Democrats	Jean-Luc Bressard	294	31.6	−14.5
Majority		343	36.8	
Turnout		931	29.4	−8.2
Conservative hold		Swing		

Capel
Party	Candidate	Votes	%	±%
Conservative	Brian Ransley	422	55.6	+25.2
Liberal Democrats	Hugh Patterson	337	44.4	−25.2
Majority		85	11.2	
Turnout		759	41.3	−1.0
Conservative gain from Liberal Democrats		Swing		

Culverden
Party	Candidate	Votes	%	±%
Conservative	Ronen Basu	919	57.1	−1.0
Green	Brian Leslie	518	32.2	+2.6
UKIP	Patricia Theophanides	172	10.7	−1.7
Majority		401	24.9	−3.6
Turnout		1,609	31.5	−1.1
Conservative hold		Swing		

Goudhurst and Lamberhurst
Party	Candidate	Votes	%	±%
Conservative	Barry Noakes	902	73.5	+8.9
Liberal Democrats	John Billingham	227	18.5	−5.3
UKIP	Victor Webb	99	8.1	−3.4
Majority		675	55.0	+14.2
Turnout		1,228	37.9	−1.0
Conservative hold		Swing		

Hawkhurst and Sandhurst
Party	Candidate	Votes	%	±%
Conservative	Beverley Palmer	1,120	66.5	−5.1
Liberal Democrats	Keith Brown	297	17.6	−10.8
UKIP	Jeffrey King	166	9.9	+9.9
Labour	David Burgess	102	6.1	+6.1
Majority		823	48.8	+5.6
Turnout		1,685	37.2	+2.7
Conservative hold		Swing		

Pantilles and St Mark's
Party	Candidate	Votes	%	±%
Conservative	Leonard Horwood	unopposed		
Conservative hold		Swing		

Park
Party	Candidate	Votes	%	±%
Conservative	Peter Bulman	1,161	62.1	+3.5
Liberal Democrats	Peter Hillier	464	24.8	−7.6
Green	Shaun Carey	244	13.1	+13.1
Majority		697	37.3	+11.1
Turnout		1,869	34.4	−1.4
Conservative hold		Swing		

Pembury
Party	Candidate	Votes	%	±%
Conservative	Paul Barrington-King	1,230	67.9	+13.6
Liberal Democrats	Jacqueline Prance	472	26.0	−13.0
UKIP	Christopher Hoare	110	6.1	−0.6
Majority		758	41.8	+26.5
Turnout		1,812	40.6	+0.9
Conservative hold		Swing		

Rusthall
Party	Candidate	Votes	%	±%
Conservative	Robert Atwood	505	42.8	−2.3
Liberal Democrats	Bob Prance	380	32.2	+4.8
Labour	Tim Probert	166	14.1	+1.6
UKIP	June Moore	129	10.9	−4.1
Majority		125	10.6	−7.1
Turnout		1,180	34.3	+0.2
Conservative gain from Liberal Democrats		Swing		

St James'
Party	Candidate	Votes	%	±%
Liberal Democrats	Beatrice Lewis	694	58.6	−6.9
Conservative	Alan McDermott	390	32.9	+9.8
UKIP	Christopher Luke	101	8.5	+8.5
Majority		304	25.7	−16.7
Turnout		1,185	33.1	−2.5
Liberal Democrats hold		Swing		

St John's
Party	Candidate	Votes	%	±%
Conservative	Tracy Moore	794	45.9	+3.2
Liberal Democrats	Alan Bullion	786	45.4	−5.0
Green	Phyllis Leslie	151	8.7	+8.7
Majority		8	0.5	
Turnout		1,731	35.8	+1.3
Conservative gain from Liberal Democrats		Swing		

Sherwood
Party	Candidate	Votes	%	±%
Conservative	Frank Williams	789	58.6	+12.0
Liberal Democrats	Peter Lewis	347	25.8	−2.2
Labour	Loma Blackmore	211	15.7	+0.7
Majority		442	32.8	+14.2
Turnout		1,347	28.9	−1.7
Conservative hold		Swing		

Southborough and High Brooms
Party	Candidate	Votes	%	±%
Conservative	Joseph Simmons	695	42.0	+4.6
Labour	Ronnie Ooi	598	36.2	+3.1
Liberal Democrats	Marguerita Morton	235	14.2	−8.2
UKIP	Eileen Gayler	125	7.6	+0.4
Majority		97	5.9	+1.6
Turnout		1,653	31.9	−2.4
Conservative hold		Swing		

Speldhurst and Bidborough
Party	Candidate	Votes	%	±%
Conservative	David Stanyer	1,345	73.6	−0.4
Liberal Democrats	Ian Williams	331	18.1	−7.9
UKIP	Peter Fasey	152	8.3	+8.3
Majority		1,014	55.5	+7.5
Turnout		1,828	40.4	+0.9
Conservative hold		Swing		
