= 2006 Tunbridge Wells Borough Council election =

Results of the 2006 Tunbridge Wells Borough Council election

The 2006 Tunbridge Wells Borough Council election took place on 4 May 2006 to elect members of Tunbridge Wells Borough Council in Kent, England. One-third of the council was up for election and the Conservative Party stayed in overall control of the council.

After the election, the composition of the council was:

- Conservative 38
- Liberal Democrat 9
- Labour 1

== Election result ==
Tunbridge Wells local election result 2006
Party	Seats	Gains	Losses	Net gain/loss	Seats %	Votes %	Votes	+/−
Conservative	14	2	0	+2	87.5	58.9	14,301	+6.1%
Liberal Democrats	2	0	2	−2	12.5	31.6	7,668	−1.5%
Labour	0	0	0	0	0	5.6	1,370	−2.3%
Green	0	0	0	0	0	2.2	536	−1.6%
UKIP	0	0	0	0	0	1.7	422	−0.4%

== Ward results ==
Benenden and Cranbrook
Party	Candidate	Votes	%	±%
Conservative	Peter Davies	1,183	60.7	+8.4
Liberal Democrats	Winifred Honnywill	603	30.9	−3.2
UKIP	Oliver Clement	163	8.4	−5.2
Majority		580	29.8	+11.6
Turnout		1,949	38.6	−4.3
Conservative hold		Swing		

Brenchley and Horsmonden
Party	Candidate	Votes	%	±%
Conservative	Sally-Ann Slade	1,096	79.1	+17.4
Liberal Democrats	John Billingham	290	20.9	−4.7
Majority		806	58.2	+22.1
Turnout		1,386	37.6	−6.5
Conservative hold		Swing		

Broadwater
Party	Candidate	Votes	%	±%
Liberal Democrats	Peter Crawford	503	46.1	+9.9
Conservative	David Stanyer	486	44.6	−1.6
UKIP	Theresa Theophanides	101	9.3	−0.6
Majority		17	1.5	
Turnout		1,090	37.6	−3.4
Liberal Democrats hold		Swing		

Culverden
Party	Candidate	Votes	%	±%
Conservative	Leonard Price	981	58.6	+4.0
Liberal Democrats	Paul Beard	450	26.9	+3.6
Green	Brian Leslie	244	14.6	+3.9
Majority		531	31.7	+0.4
Turnout		1,675	34.9	−2.4
Conservative hold		Swing		

Hawkhurst and Sandhurst
Party	Candidate	Votes	%	±%
Conservative	John Cunningham	1,064	69.9	+4.4
Liberal Democrats	Keith Brown	458	30.1	+4.8
Majority		606	39.8	−0.4
Turnout		1,522	34.9	−7.0
Conservative hold		Swing		

Paddock Wood East
Party	Candidate	Votes	%	±%
Conservative	David Marriott	603	64.8	+26.8
Liberal Democrats	Lorraine Braam	207	22.2	−13.8
Labour	Timothy Rich	121	13.0	−8.4
Majority		396	42.6	+40.6
Turnout		931	30.9	+5.8
Conservative hold		Swing		

Paddock Wood West
Party	Candidate	Votes	%	±%
Conservative	Elizabeth Thomas	525	60.6	+3.4
Labour	Raymond Moon	183	21.1	+4.3
UKIP	Victor Webb	158	18.2	+18.2
Majority		342	39.5	+8.3
Turnout		866	30.1	+7.2
Conservative hold		Swing		

Pantiles and St Marks
Party	Candidate	Votes	%	±%
Conservative	James Scholes	1,156	68.6	+2.3
Liberal Democrats	Jane Johnson	529	31.4	−2.3
Majority		627	37.2	+4.6
Turnout		1,685	35.0	−5.4
Conservative hold		Swing		

Park
Party	Candidate	Votes	%	±%
Conservative	Catherine Mayhew	1,250	63.9	+9.1
Liberal Democrats	Peter Hillier	707	36.1	+5.1
Majority		543	27.8	+4.0
Turnout		1,957	38.2	−4.2
Conservative hold		Swing		

Pembury
Party	Candidate	Votes	%	±%
Conservative	Michael Tompsett	1,124	56.2	−1.5
Liberal Democrats	Thomas Symondson	877	43.8	+10.0
Majority		247	12.4	−11.5
Turnout		2,001	44.7	+1.6
Conservative gain from Liberal Democrats		Swing		

St James'
Party	Candidate	Votes	%	±%
Liberal Democrats	David Neve	776	65.5	+5.2
Conservative	Christopher Browne	273	23.1	−3.1
Green	Richard Leslie	135	11.4	+11.4
Majority		503	42.4	+8.3
Turnout		1,184	35.6	+1.6
Liberal Democrats hold		Swing		

St John's
Party	Candidate	Votes	%	±%
Conservative	Christopher Woodward	760	44.7	+7.1
Liberal Democrats	Lesley Herriot	636	37.4	−4.5
Green	Phyllis Leslie	157	9.2	+1.8
Labour	Keith Hamm	146	8.6	+0.0
Majority		124	7.3	+3.0
Turnout		1,699	35.5	+0.2
Conservative gain from Liberal Democrats		Swing		

Sherwood
Party	Candidate	Votes	%	±%
Conservative	Edward Jolley	754	53.7	+0.3
Liberal Democrats	Alan Bullion	399	28.4	+7.0
Labour	Jemima Blackmore	252	17.9	−7.4
Majority		355	25.3	−2.8
Turnout		1,405	30.9	−0.6
Conservative hold		Swing		

Southborough and High Brooms
Party	Candidate	Votes	%	±%
Conservative	Colin Bothwell	849	49.4	+10.6
Labour	Dianne Hill	561	32.7	−4.5
Liberal Democrats	Marguerita Morton	308	17.9	+2.1
Majority		188	16.7	+15.1
Turnout		1,718	33.7	−0.5
Conservative hold		Swing		

Southborough North
Party	Candidate	Votes	%	±%
Conservative	Michael Rusbridge	797	57.8	+11.4
Liberal Democrats	Terence Driscoll	474	34.4	−14.0
Labour	Gregory Lay	107	7.8	+7.8
Majority		323	23.4	
Turnout		1,378	45.1	+7.1
Conservative hold		Swing		

Speldhurst and Bidborough
Party	Candidate	Votes	%	±%
Conservative	Melvyn Howell	1,400	75.6	+4.9
Liberal Democrats	Ian Williams	451	24.4	−4.9
Majority		949	51.2	+9.8
Turnout		1,851	42.3	−2.4
Conservative hold		Swing		
