= 2018 Tunbridge Wells Borough Council election =

2018 UK local government election

Map of the results

The 2018 Tunbridge Wells Borough Council election took place on 3 May 2018 to elect members of Tunbridge Wells Borough Council in England. This was on the same day as other local elections.

== Ward results ==
=== Benenden and Cranbook ===
Benenden and Cranbook
Party	Candidate	Votes	%	±%
Conservative	Tom Dawlings*	854	50	+8
Alliance	John Smith	542	32	N/A
Labour	Anne Musker	175	10	+1
Liberal Democrats	Saul Clackson	136	8	−18
Majority		312		
Turnout		1,699	32.15	
Conservative hold		Swing		

=== Brenchley and Horsmonden ===
Brenchley and Horsmonden
Party	Candidate	Votes	%	±%
Conservative	Alan McDermott*	951	65	+9
Labour	Kelly Llewellyn	262	18	+2
Liberal Democrats	Zoe Norman	240	17	+10
Majority		689		
Turnout		1,440	35.99	
Conservative hold		Swing		

=== Broadwater ===
Broadwater
Party	Candidate	Votes	%	±%
Conservative	Chris Woodward*	479	39	−7
Liberal Democrats	Christopher Hall	471	39	+31
Labour	Louise Reid	213	17	+1
UKIP	Alun Elder-Brown	59	5	−26
Majority		8		
Turnout		1,218	37.64	
Conservative hold		Swing		

=== Culverden ===
Culverden
Party	Candidate	Votes	%	±%
Conservative	David Scott	663	30	−17
Alliance	Lucy Willis	499	23	N/A
Liberal Democrats	Martin Brice	400	18	+5
Labour	Carol Wilson	327	15	+5
Women's Equality	Liz Orr	323	15	N/A
Majority		164		
Turnout		2,208	38.3	
Conservative hold		Swing		

=== Hawkhurst and Sandhurst ===
Hawkhurst and Sandhurst
Party	Candidate	Votes	%	±%
Conservative	Patrick Thomson	1,012	68	+17
Labour	Ana Draper	261	17	+10
Liberal Democrats	Clare Bishop	221	15	+10
Majority		751		
Turnout		1,486	31.74	
Conservative hold		Swing		

=== Paddock Wood East ===
Paddock Wood East
Party	Candidate	Votes	%	±%
Conservative	Allan Gooda	430	44	±0
Alliance	Rodney Atkins	265	27	N/A
Labour	Derek Boyle	196	20	+9
Liberal Democrats	Gillian Douglass	78	8	+1
Majority		165		
Turnout		967	31.47	
Conservative hold		Swing		

=== Paddock Wood West ===
Paddock Wood West
Party	Candidate	Votes	%	±%
Conservative	Elizabeth Thomas*	425	45	+1
Labour	Raymond Moon	235	25	+6
Alliance	Brian Ransley	143	15	N/A
Liberal Democrats	James Cole	72	8	+2
Green	Trevor Bisdee	65	7	N/A
Majority		190		
Turnout		936	33.03	
Conservative hold		Swing		

=== Pantiles and St. Mark's ===
Pantiles and St. Mark's
Party	Candidate	Votes	%	±%
Conservative	James Scholes*	983	48	−8
Liberal Democrats	Andy Hickey	729	35	+21
Labour	Lorna Blackmore	344	17	+2
Majority		254		
Turnout		2,042	39.63	
Conservative hold		Swing		

=== Park ===
Park
Party	Candidate	Votes	%	±%
Alliance	Nick Pope	773	34	N/A
Conservative	Catherine Rankin	630	28	−21
Liberal Democrats	Rachel Sadler	533	23	+10
Labour	Hugo Pound	335	15	−1
Majority		143		
Turnout		40.64	2,265	
Alliance gain from Conservative		Swing		

=== Pembury ===
Pembury
Party	Candidate	Votes	%	±%
Conservative	Paul Barrington-King*	1,014	63	+22
Liberal Democrats	Colin Sefton	301	19	+15
Labour	Sarah Carpenter	282	18	+12
Majority		713		
Turnout		1,589	35.74	
Conservative hold		Swing		

=== Sherwood ===
Sherwood
Party	Candidate	Votes	%	±%
Conservative	Bob Backhouse*	633	39	−8
Labour	Seb St John	520	32	+18
Alliance	Nick Twist	290	18	N/A
Liberal Democrats	Alan Bullion	113	7	+2
UKIP	Chris Hoare	67	4	−29
Majority		113		
Turnout		1,621	41.45	
Conservative hold		Swing		

=== Southborough and High Brooms ===
Southborough and High Brooms
Party	Candidate	Votes	%	±%
Labour	Alain Lewis	1,094	62	+30
Conservative	Harry Allen	455	26	−6
Liberal Democrats	Marguerita Morton	211	12	+2
Majority		639		
Turnout		1,747	32.17	
Labour hold		Swing		

=== Southborough North ===
Southborough North
Party	Candidate	Votes	%	±%
Conservative	Joe Simmons	614	51	−5
Liberal Democrats	Trevor Poile	354	29	+16
Labour	Martin Betts	247	20	+4
Majority		260		
Turnout		1,211	38.13	
Conservative hold		Swing		

=== Speldhurst and Bidborough ===
Speldhurst and Bidborough
Party	Candidate	Votes	%	±%
Conservative	Julia Soyke*	1,186	66	+5
Liberal Democrats	Jackie Prance	361	20	+10
Labour	David Adams	251	14	+4
Majority		825		
Turnout		1,789	38.39	
Conservative hold		Swing		

=== St. James' ===
St. James'
Party	Candidate	Votes	%	±%
Liberal Democrats	David Neve*	762	51	−2
Alliance	Steve Bowser	270	18	N/A
Labour	Isobel Kerrigan	246	16	+3
Conservative	Matt Bailey	230	15	−2
Majority		492		
Turnout		1,506	35.27	
Liberal Democrats hold		Swing		

=== St. John's ===
St. John's
Party	Candidate	Votes	%	±%
Liberal Democrats	Mark Ellis	1,038	47	+15
Labour	Bjorn Simpole	599	27	+18
Conservative	Jamil Nasir	575	26	−9
Majority		439		
Turnout		2,208	43.03	
Liberal Democrats gain from Conservative		Swing		
