= 2004 Tunbridge Wells Borough Council election =

2004 UK local government election

Results of the 2004 Tunbridge Wells Borough Council election

The 2004 Tunbridge Wells Borough Council election took place on 10 June 2004 to elect members of Tunbridge Wells Borough Council in Kent, England. One third of the council was up for election and the Conservative Party stayed in overall control of the council.

After the election, the composition of the council was:

- Conservative 35
- Liberal Democrat 12
- Labour 1

== Election result ==
Tunbridge Wells local election result 2004
Party	Seats	Gains	Losses	Net gain/loss	Seats %	Votes %	Votes	+/−
Conservative	12	1	0	+1	75.0	52.8	13,797	+0.8%
Liberal Democrats	4	0	0	0	25.0	33.1	8,645	+1.0%
Labour	0	0	1	−1	0	7.9	2,074	−1.6%
Green	0	0	0	0	0	3.8	1,000	+0.6%
UKIP	0	0	0	0	0	2.1	559	+0.4%
Independent	0	0	0	0	0	0.3	76	−1.2%

== Ward results ==
Benenden and Cranbrook
Party	Candidate	Votes	%	±%
Conservative	Eleanor North	1,135	52.3	−10.6
Liberal Democrats	Winifred Honnywill	740	34.1	+5.3
UKIP	Oliver Clement	294	13.6	+5.4
Majority		395	18.2	−15.9
Turnout		2,169	42.9	+12.0
Conservative hold		Swing		

Brenchley and Horsmonden
Party	Candidate	Votes	%	±%
Conservative	Nicholas Fairrie	1,016	61.7	
Liberal Democrats	Arthur Charlesworth	421	25.6	
Green	Matthew Robertson	209	12.7	
Majority		595	36.1	
Turnout		1,646	44.1	+10.8
Conservative hold		Swing		

Broadwater
Party	Candidate	Votes	%	±%
Conservative	Barbara Cobbold	561	46.2	
Liberal Democrats	Jamie Johnson	440	36.2	
UKIP	Victor Webb	120	9.9	
Labour	Richard Maryan	94	7.7	
Majority		121	10.0	
Turnout		1,215	41.0	+9.4
Conservative hold		Swing		

Capel
Party	Candidate	Votes	%	±%
Liberal Democrats	Hugh Patterson	496	69.6	+5.8
Conservative	Paul Green	217	30.4	−5.8
Majority		279	39.2	+11.6
Turnout		713	42.3	+5.3
Liberal Democrats hold		Swing		

Culverden
Party	Candidate	Votes	%	±%
Conservative	Eldred Wakefield	985	54.6	−6.6
Liberal Democrats	Andrew Ollive	420	23.3	−9.3
Labour	David Kirkham	206	11.4	+11.4
Green	Brian Leslie	194	10.7	−0.6
Majority		565	31.3	+2.7
Turnout		1,805	37.3	+10.6
Conservative hold		Swing		

Goudhurst and Lamberhurst
Party	Candidate	Votes	%	±%
Conservative	Colin Noakes	933	69.7	+10.7
Liberal Democrats	John Billingham	406	30.3	+13.2
Majority		527	39.4	+4.3
Turnout		1,339	42.8	+5.2
Conservative hold		Swing		

Hawkhurst and Sandhurst
Party	Candidate	Votes	%	±%
Conservative	Beverley Palmer	1,183	65.5	+0.8
Liberal Democrats	Keith Brown	457	25.3	−1.8
Labour	David Burgess	166	9.2	+1.0
Majority		726	40.2	+2.6
Turnout		1,806	41.9	+11.9
Conservative hold		Swing		

Pantiles and St Marks
Party	Candidate	Votes	%	±%
Conservative	Leonard Horwood	1,274	66.3	+2.0
Liberal Democrats	Peter Hillier	648	33.7	+4.9
Majority		626	32.6	−2.9
Turnout		1,922	40.4	+11.4
Conservative hold		Swing		

Park
Party	Candidate	Votes	%	±%
Conservative	Peter Bulman	1,204	54.8	+6.6
Liberal Democrats	Alan Bullion	681	31.0	−14.2
Green	Storm Poorun	165	7.5	+7.5
Labour	Jae Fassam	146	6.6	+0.1
Majority		523	23.8	+20.8
Turnout		2,196	42.4	+12.2
Conservative hold		Swing		

Pembury
Party	Candidate	Votes	%	±%
Conservative	Paul Barrington-King	1,112	57.7	+17.7
Liberal Democrats	Lorraine Braam	651	33.8	−18.6
Green	Toby Allen	163	8.5	+8.5
Majority		461	23.9	
Turnout		1,926	43.1	+7.7
Conservative hold		Swing		

Rusthall
Party	Candidate	Votes	%	±%
Liberal Democrats	Robert Wratten	691	51.6	+10.9
Conservative	James Perry	377	28.2	−6.6
UKIP	Patricia Theophanides	145	10.8	+2.5
Labour	Sarah Carpenter	126	9.4	−2.8
Majority		314	23.4	+17.5
Turnout		1,339	38.5	+12.7
Liberal Democrats hold		Swing		

St James'
Party	Candidate	Votes	%	±%
Liberal Democrats	Beatrice Lewis	717	60.3	
Conservative	Rosemary Fitzherbert	312	26.2	
Labour	Brian Clenshaw	160	13.5	
Majority		405	34.1	
Turnout		1,189	34.0	+2.5
Liberal Democrats hold		Swing		

St John's
Party	Candidate	Votes	%	±%
Liberal Democrats	Simon Bannister	715	41.9	−9.9
Conservative	Brian Ranslet	641	37.6	+6.1
Labour	Peter Ross-Skedd	147	8.6	−1.8
Green	Phyllis Leslie	126	7.4	+1.1
Independent	David Wilson	76	4.5	+4.5
Majority		74	4.3	−16.0
Turnout		1,705	35.3	+10.5
Liberal Democrats hold		Swing		

Sherwood
Party	Candidate	Votes	%	±%
Conservative	Frank Williams	792	53.4	+13.5
Labour	Ian Carvell	375	25.3	−5.3
Liberal Democrats	Cicilia Bannister	317	21.4	−2.6
Majority		417	28.1	+18.8
Turnout		1,484	31.5	+8.6
Conservative hold		Swing		

Southborough and High Brooms
Party	Candidate	Votes	%	±%
Conservative	Joseph Simmons	682	38.8	−2.8
Labour	David Belchem	654	37.2	−4.6
Liberal Democrats	Marguerita Morton	277	15.8	+15.8
Green	Chris Godson	143	8.1	0.0
Majority		28	1.6	
Turnout		1,756	34.2	+8.9
Conservative gain from Labour		Swing		

Speldhurst and Bidborough
Party	Candidate	Votes	%	±%
Conservative	Jennifer Paulson-Ellis	1,373	70.7	+0.1
Liberal Democrats	Jacqueline Cassidy	568	29.3	+6.1
Majority		805	41.4	−6.0
Turnout		1,941	44.7	+12.2
Conservative hold		Swing		
