= 2022 Tunbridge Wells Borough Council election =

Local election held in the Borough of Tunbridge Wells

- 5 May 2022

16 out of 48 seats to Tunbridge Wells Borough Council 25 seats needed for a majority

	First party	Second party
Leader	Ben Chapelard	Thomas Dawlings
Party	Liberal Democrats	Conservative
Last election	13 seats, 26.8%	24 seats, 36.9%
Seats won	6	2
Seats after	17	15
Seat change	▲4	▼9
Popular vote	6,379	9,150
Percentage	22.4%	32.1%
Swing	▼4.4%	▼4.8%
	Third party	Fourth party
Leader	Nicolas Pope	Hugo Pound
Party	Alliance	Labour
Last election	6 seats, 12.8%	5 seats, 16.8%
Seats won	5	3
Seats after	9	7
Seat change	▲3	▲2
Popular vote	6,134	5,573
Percentage	21.5%	19.6%
Swing	▲8.7%	▲2.8%
- Winner of each seat at the 2022 Tunbridge Wells Borough Council election
Leader of the council before election
Thomas Dawlings
Conservative
Leader of the council after election
Ben Chapelard
Liberal Democrats

The 2022 Tunbridge Wells Borough Council election took place on 5 May 2022 to elect one third of Tunbridge Wells Borough Council in England.

== Results summary ==
2022 Tunbridge Wells Borough Council election
Party	This election			Full council			This election		
Party	Seats	Net	Seats %	Other	Total	Total %	Votes	Votes %	+/−
Liberal Democrats	6	▲4	37.5	11	17	35.4	6,379	22.4	-4.4
Conservative	2	▼9	12.5	13	15	29.2	9,150	32.1	-4.8
Alliance	5	▲3	31.3	4	9	20.8	6,134	21.5	+8.7
Labour	3	▲2	18.8	4	7	14.6	5,573	19.6	+2.8
Green	0	Steady	0.0	0	0	0.0	1,140	4.0	-2.4
UKIP	0	Steady	0.0	0	0	0.0	103	0.4	+0.1
Socialist (GB)	0	Steady	0.0	0	0	0.0	11	<0.1	N/A

== Ward results ==
=== Benenden & Cranbrook ===
Benenden & Cranbrook
Party	Candidate	Votes	%	±%
Conservative	Thomas Dawlings	766	43.1	−5.5
Alliance	Lee Hatcher	675	38.0	+9.1
Labour	Dariel Francis	174	9.8	+2.6
Green	Julie Simpson	162	9.1	+2.8
Majority		91	5.1	
Turnout		1,777	33.8	
Conservative hold		Swing	▼7.3	

=== Brenchley & Horsmonden ===
Brenchley & Horsmonden
Party	Candidate	Votes	%	±%
Alliance	Stephen Mcmillan	755	45.1	+18.4
Conservative	Thomas Mobbs	556	33.2	−12.5
Labour	Kevin Kerrigan	225	13.4	+0.7
Green	Louise Wilby	139	8.3	−0.5
Majority		199	11.9	
Turnout		1,675	40.5	
Alliance gain from Conservative		Swing	▲15.5	

=== Broadwater ===
Broadwater
Party	Candidate	Votes	%	±%
Liberal Democrats	Jamie Johnson	429	34.1	+0.4
Green	Adrian Thorne	376	29.9	+3.5
Conservative	Christopher Woodward	296	23.5	−7.2
Labour	Anne Musker	72	5.7	−1.2
Alliance	Pennt Kift	68	5.4	N/A
UKIP	Alun Elder-Brown	18	1.4	−0.9
Majority		53	4.2	
Turnout		1,259	39.6	
Liberal Democrats gain from Conservative		Swing	▼1.6	

=== Culverden ===
Culverden
Party	Candidate	Votes	%	±%
Liberal Democrats	Martin Brice	1,313	54.6	+0.9
Conservative	David Scott	732	30.4	−2.6
Labour	Stephen Burgess	276	11.5	−1.8
UKIP	Victor Webb	85	3.5	N/A
Majority		581	24.2	
Turnout		2,406	39.0	
Liberal Democrats gain from Conservative		Swing	▲1.8	

=== Hawkhurst & Sandhurst ===
Hawkhurst & Sandhurst
Party	Candidate	Votes	%	±%
Alliance	Ellen Neville	868	48.1	+26.8
Conservative	Patrick Thomson	746	41.4	−16.8
Labour	Ana-Mari Draper	190	10.5	+2.1
Majority		122	6.7	
Turnout		1,804		
Alliance gain from Conservative		Swing	▲21.8	

=== Paddock Wood East ===
Paddock Wood East
Party	Candidate	Votes	%	±%
Alliance	Suzie Wakeman	577	48.0	N/A
Conservative	Sarah Hamilton	391	32.5	+1.1
Labour	Derek Boyle	175	14.5	+2.5
Green	Penelope Peerless	60	5.0	−3.9
Majority		186	15.5	
Turnout		1,203		
Alliance gain from Conservative		Swing	N/A	

=== Paddock Wood West ===
Paddock Wood West
Party	Candidate	Votes	%	±%
Labour	Raymond Moon	397	36.2	+5.3
Conservative	Vivek Gautam	301	27.4	−11.2
Alliance	Begnat Robichaud	217	19.8	N/A
Green	Trevor Bisdee	133	12.1	−13.4
Liberal Democrats	James Cole	50	4.6	−0.3
Majority		96	8.8	
Turnout		1,098	36.9	
Labour gain from Conservative		Swing	▲8.3	

=== Pantiles & St. Mark's ===
Pantiles & St. Mark's
Party	Candidate	Votes	%	±%
Liberal Democrats	Gavin Barrass	1,386	58.4	+10.3
Conservative	Dogan Delman	715	30.1	−6.0
Green	John Hurst	132	5.6	−3.1
Labour	Lorna Blackmore	130	5.5	−1.5
Socialist (GB)	Shannon Kennedy	11	0.5	N/A
Majority		671	28.3	
Turnout		2,374	45.1	
Liberal Democrats gain from Conservative		Swing	▲8.2	

=== Park ===
Park
Party	Candidate	Votes	%	±%
Alliance	Nicholas Pope	902	37.0	+11.6
Conservative	Sedat Zorba	793	32.5	−3.2
Liberal Democrats	Julia Luxford	437	17.9	+1.2
Labour	Susan Pound	308	12.6	−0.8
Majority		109	4.5	
Turnout		2,440	41.9	
Alliance hold		Swing	▲7.4	

=== Pembury ===
Pembury
Party	Candidate	Votes	%	±%
Conservative	Paul Barrington-King	808	46.1	−0.1
Alliance	Angela Ward	750	42.8	+8.4
Labour	Philip Wheeler	194	11.1	+0.5
Majority		58	3.3	
Turnout		1,752	40.0	
Conservative hold		Swing	▼4.3	

=== Sherwood ===
Sherwood
Party	Candidate	Votes	%	±%
Labour	Shadi Rogers	930	53.4	+15.2
Conservative	Robert Backhouse	813	46.6	−4.1
Majority		117	6.8	
Turnout		1,743	30.9	
Labour gain from Conservative		Swing	▲9.7	

=== Southborough & High Brooms ===
Southborough & High Brooms
Party	Candidate	Votes	%	±%
Labour	Alain Lewis	1,033	60.3	+7.8
Conservative	Nasir Jamil	436	25.5	−3.8
Liberal Democrats	Yvonne Raptis	243	14.2	+6.0
Majority		597	34.8	
Turnout		1,712	31.3	
Labour hold		Swing	▲5.8	

=== Southborough North ===
Southborough North
Party	Candidate	Votes	%	±%
Liberal Democrats	Brendon Le Page	630	43.8	−8.4
Conservative	Joseph Simmons	604	42.0	+10.5
Labour	John Francis	203	14.1	+3.8
Majority		26	1.8	
Turnout		1,437	43.8	
Liberal Democrats gain from Conservative		Swing	▼9.5	

=== Speldhurst & Bidborough ===
Speldhurst & Bidborough
Party	Candidate	Votes	%	±%
Alliance	Matthew Sankey	1,322	64.6	+37.6
Conservative	Clive Allen	579	28.3	−11.1
Labour	Millie Gray	146	7.1	−0.5
Majority		743	36.3	
Turnout		2,047	44.6	
Alliance hold		Swing	▲24.4	

=== St. James' ===
St. James'
Party	Candidate	Votes	%	±%
Liberal Democrats	Robert Wormington	984	62.8	−6.2
Conservative	Nicola King	229	14.6	−1.9
Labour	Alan Bullion	217	13.8	−0.7
Green	Alasdair Fraser	138	8.8	N/A
Majority		755	48.2	
Turnout		1,568	35.9	
Liberal Democrats hold		Swing	▼2.2	

=== St. John's ===
St. John's
Party	Candidate	Votes	%	±%
Liberal Democrats	Mark Ellis	907	41.3	−7.9
Labour	Michael Tapp	903	41.1	+15.5
Conservative	Thelma Huggett	385	17.5	−7.7
Majority		4	0.2	
Turnout		2,195	42.5	
Liberal Democrats hold		Swing	▼11.7	
