= 2000 Tunbridge Wells Borough Council election =

2000 UK local government election

The 2000 Tunbridge Wells Borough Council election took place on 4 May 2000 to elect members of Tunbridge Wells Borough Council in Kent, England. One third of the council was up for election and the Conservative Party stayed in overall control of the council.

After the election, the composition of the council was:

- Conservative 31
- Liberal Democrat 11
- Labour 5
- Independent 1

== Results ==
Tunbridge Wells local election result 2000
Party	Seats	Gains	Losses	Net gain/loss	Seats %	Votes %	Votes	+/−
Conservative	11			+3	68.8			
Liberal Democrats	5			−1	31.3			
Labour	0			−2	0			
