= 2024 Tunbridge Wells Borough Council election =

2024 English local election

- 2 May 2024

All 39 seats on Tunbridge Wells Borough Council 20 seats needed for a majority
- Turnout: 37%

| | First party | Second party | Third party |
|---|---|---|---|
| Leader | Ben Chapelard | Tom Dawlings | Hugo Pound |
| Party | Liberal Democrats | Conservative | Labour |
| Leader's seat | St James' | Benenden & Cranbrook | Sherwood |
| Last election | 17 seats, 25.3% | 11 seats, 29.4% | 8 seats, 16.3% |
| Seats before | 17 | 11 | 7 |
| Seats won | 22 | 7 | 5 |
| Seat change | ▲5 | ▼4 | ▼2 |
| Popular vote | 28,797 | 24,673 | 12,022 |
| Percentage | 34.2% | 29.3% | 14.3% |
| Swing | ▲8.9% | ▼0.1% | ▼2.0% |
| | Fourth party | Fifth party |
| Leader | Nicholas Pope |
| Party | Alliance | IfTW |
| Leader's seat | Park (defeated) |
| Last election | 9 seats, 18.1% | 1 seat, 2.4% |
| Seats before | 7 | 4 |
| Seats won | 4 | 1 |
| Seat change | ▼3 | ▼3 |
| Popular vote | 7,323 | 4,261 |
| Percentage | 8.7% | 5.1% |
| Swing | ▼9.4% | ▲2.7% |
- Winner of each seat at the 2024 Tunbridge Wells Borough Council election
Leader before election
Ben Chapelard
Liberal Democrat
No overall control
Leader after election
Ben Chapelard
Liberal Democrats

The 2024 Tunbridge Wells Borough Council election took place on 2 May 2024 to elect members of Tunbridge Wells Borough Council in Kent, England. This was on the same day as other local elections.

The council reported borough-wide turnout of 37% and published detailed results for each ward.

Following a review of ward boundaries, the election was contested with new electoral divisions and with a reduced number of seats, 39 down from 48.

== Summary ==
The council was under no overall control prior to the election, being run by a coalition of the Liberal Democrats, local party the Tunbridge Wells Alliance, and Labour, led by Liberal Democrat councillor Ben Chapelard. The election saw the Liberal Democrats take majority control of the council.

=== Election result ===
2024 Tunbridge Wells Borough Council election
| Party | Candidates | Seats | Gains | Losses | Net gain/loss | Seats % | Votes % | Votes | +/− |
|---|---|---|---|---|---|---|---|---|---|
| Liberal Democrats | 39 | 22 | 3 | 0 | ▲5 | 56.4 | 34.2 | 28,797 | +8.9 |
| Conservative | 39 | 7 | 0 | 2 | ▼4 | 18.0 | 29.3 | 24,673 | –0.1 |
| Labour | 25 | 5 | 0 | 0 | ▼2 | 12.8 | 14.3 | 12,022 | –2.0 |
| Alliance | 10 | 4 | 0 | 1 | ▼3 | 10.3 | 8.7 | 7,323 | –9.4 |
| Independents for Tunbridge Wells | 17 | 1 | 0 | 0 | ▼3 | 2.6 | 5.1 | 4,261 | +2.7 |
| Independent | 2 | 0 | 0 | 0 | Steady | 0.0 | 1.0 | 850 | N/A |
| Green | 18 | 0 | 0 | 0 | Steady | 0.0 | 6.5 | 5,485 | –1.7 |
| Reform | 5 | 0 | 0 | 0 | Steady | 0.0 | 1.1 | 906 | +0.8 |

== Ward results ==
The Statement of Persons Nominated, which details the candidates standing in each ward, was released by Tunbridge Wells Borough Council following the close of nominations on 8 April 2024.

=== Cranbrook, Sissinghurst & Frittenden ===
Cranbrook, Sissinghurst & Frittenden (3 seats)
| Party | Candidate | Votes | % | ±% |
|---|---|---|---|---|
| Conservative | Andy Fairweather* | 917 | 53.1 | |
| Alliance | Nancy Warne* | 843 | 48.8 | |
| Conservative | David Somers | 640 | 37.0 | |
| Conservative | John Austen | 547 | 31.7 | |
| Green | John Hurst | 360 | 20.8 | |
| Labour | Joel Turner | 275 | 15.9 | |
| Liberal Democrats | James Cole | 197 | 11.4 | |
| Liberal Democrats | Sally Moesgaard-Kjeldsen | 197 | 11.4 | |
| IfTW | Chris Hoare | 155 | 9.0 | |
| Liberal Democrats | Brian Guinnessy | 139 | 8.0 | |
| Turnout | | 1,736 | 31.3 | |
| Registered electors | | 5,552 | | |
| Conservative win (new seat) | | | | |
| Alliance win (new seat) | | | | |
| Conservative win (new seat) | | | | |

=== Culverden ===
Culverden (3 seats)
| Party | Candidate | Votes | % | ±% |
|---|---|---|---|---|
| Liberal Democrats | Justine Rutland* | 1,184 | 51.1 | |
| Liberal Democrats | Martin Brice* | 1,128 | 48.6 | |
| Liberal Democrats | David Osborne* | 1,070 | 46.1 | |
| Conservative | Alex Dunn | 713 | 30.7 | |
| Conservative | David Scott | 653 | 28.2 | |
| Conservative | Victoria White* | 620 | 26.7 | |
| Green | Victoria Moll | 337 | 14.5 | |
| Labour | Martin Betts | 330 | 14.2 | |
| Labour | Greg Holder | 267 | 11.5 | |
| IfTW | Sam Macdonald Walmsley | 166 | 7.2 | |
| Turnout | | 2,323 | 37.6 | |
| Registered electors | | 6,182 | | |
| Liberal Democrats hold | | | | |
| Liberal Democrats hold | | | | |
| Liberal Democrats hold | | | | |

=== Hawkhurst, Sandhurst & Benenden ===
Hawkhurst, Sandhurst & Benenden (3 seats)
| Party | Candidate | Votes | % | ±% |
|---|---|---|---|---|
| Conservative | Tom Dawlings* | 903 | 41.1 | |
| Conservative | Beverley Palmer* | 846 | 38.5 | |
| Alliance | Ellen Neville* | 809 | 36.8 | |
| Alliance | Clare Escombe | 748 | 34.1 | |
| Conservative | Martin Taylor-Smith | 745 | 33.9 | |
| Labour | Mia Dahl | 309 | 14.1 | |
| Green | Debs Keech | 281 | 12.8 | |
| Liberal Democrats | Hazel Strouts | 267 | 12.2 | |
| Reform | Simon Hilton | 248 | 11.3 | |
| Liberal Democrats | Andrew Dawson | 228 | 10.4 | |
| Liberal Democrats | Vivian Widgery | 123 | 5.6 | |
| IfTW | Angie Ward | 84 | 3.8 | |
| IfTW | Dan Littlechild | 82 | 3.7 | |
| Turnout | | 2,211 | 34.0 | |
| Registered electors | | 6,497 | | |
| Conservative win (new seat) | | | | |
| Conservative win (new seat) | | | | |
| Alliance win (new seat) | | | | |

=== High Brooms ===
High Brooms
| Party | Candidate | Votes | % | ±% |
|---|---|---|---|---|
| Labour Co-op | Dianne Hill* | 427 | 55.9 | |
| Liberal Democrats | Steve Humphreys | 130 | 17.0 | |
| Conservative | Freddie Mobbs | 82 | 10.7 | |
| Reform | Rick Williams | 61 | 8.0 | |
| Green | Paul Froome | 47 | 6.2 | |
| IfTW | David Kain | 17 | 2.2 | |
| Turnout | | 765 | 32.4 | |
| Registered electors | | 2,362 | | |
| Labour Co-op win (new seat) | | | | |

=== Paddock Wood ===
Paddock Wood (3 seats)
| Party | Candidate | Votes | % | ±% |
|---|---|---|---|---|
| Liberal Democrats | Mark Munday* | 872 | 38.8 | |
| Liberal Democrats | Don Kent | 850 | 37.8 | |
| Liberal Democrats | Adrian Pitts | 849 | 37.8 | |
| Conservative | Ros Tucker | 777 | 34.6 | |
| Independent | Rodney Atkins* | 670 | 29.8 | |
| Conservative | Nicolas Maari | 609 | 27.1 | |
| Conservative | John Hall | 550 | 24.5 | |
| IfTW | Begnat Robichaud | 370 | 16.5 | |
| Green | Trevor Bisdee | 340 | 15.1 | |
| Labour | Isobel Kerrigan | 224 | 10.0 | |
| Turnout | | 2,254 | 34.4 | |
| Registered electors | | 6,560 | | |
| Liberal Democrats win (new seat) | | | | |
| Liberal Democrats win (new seat) | | | | |
| Liberal Democrats win (new seat) | | | | |

=== Pantiles ===
Pantiles (3 seats)
| Party | Candidate | Votes | % | ±% |
|---|---|---|---|---|
| Liberal Democrats | Jamie Johnson* | 1,185 | 47.0 | |
| Liberal Democrats | Christopher Hall* | 1,179 | 46.7 | |
| Liberal Democrats | Pamela Wilkinson* | 1,011 | 40.1 | |
| Conservative | James Allen | 685 | 27.2 | |
| Conservative | Zoe Dommett | 670 | 26.6 | |
| Conservative | David Evans | 637 | 25.2 | |
| Green | Penny Peerless | 334 | 13.2 | |
| Labour Co-op | Alan Bullion | 333 | 13.2 | |
| Green | Michael Calvert | 265 | 10.5 | |
| Green | Kate Sergeant | 240 | 9.5 | |
| Reform | John Spence | 209 | 8.3 | |
| Independent | Penny Kift | 180 | 7.1 | |
| IfTW | Dino Myers-Lamptey | 146 | 5.8 | |
| Turnout | | 2,532 | 36.9 | |
| Registered electors | | 6,859 | | |
| Liberal Democrats win (new seat) | | | | |
| Liberal Democrats win (new seat) | | | | |
| Liberal Democrats win (new seat) | | | | |

=== Park ===
Park (3 seats)
| Party | Candidate | Votes | % | ±% |
|---|---|---|---|---|
| Liberal Democrats | Matt Lowe | 1,240 | 44.5 | |
| Liberal Democrats | Corinna Keefe | 1,076 | 38.6 | |
| Liberal Democrats | Tara Matthews | 1,009 | 36.2 | |
| Alliance | Nick Pope* | 864 | 31.0 | |
| Conservative | Bob Atwood | 747 | 26.8 | |
| Conservative | Andrew Hobart | 712 | 25.5 | |
| Conservative | Sedat Zorba | 689 | 24.7 | |
| Green | Alasdair Fraser | 434 | 15.6 | |
| Labour | Sue Pound | 339 | 12.2 | |
| Labour | Jack Faulkner | 309 | 11.1 | |
| Reform | Michael Jerrom | 216 | 7.7 | |
| Turnout | | 2,793 | 42.2 | |
| Registered electors | | 6,616 | | |
| Liberal Democrats gain from Alliance | | | | |
| Liberal Democrats gain from Conservative | | | | |
| Liberal Democrats gain from Alliance | | | | |

=== Pembury & Capel ===
Pembury & Capel (3 seats)
| Party | Candidate | Votes | % | ±% |
|---|---|---|---|---|
| Liberal Democrats | Hugh Patterson* | 1,099 | 40.8 | |
| Liberal Democrats | Astra Birch | 1,032 | 38.3 | |
| IfTW | David Hayward* | 989 | 36.7 | |
| Liberal Democrats | Colin Sefton | 888 | 33.0 | |
| IfTW | Suzie Wakeman* | 807 | 30.0 | |
| Conservative | Paul Barrington-King* | 797 | 29.6 | |
| Conservative | Paul Roberts* | 554 | 20.6 | |
| Conservative | Vivek Gautam | 446 | 16.6 | |
| Green | Evelien Hurst-Buist | 226 | 8.4 | |
| Labour | Anne Musker | 183 | 6.8 | |
| Turnout | | 2,701 | 41.5 | |
| Registered electors | | 6,513 | | |
| Liberal Democrats win (new seat) | | | | |
| Liberal Democrats win (new seat) | | | | |
| Independent win (new seat) | | | | |

=== Rural Tunbridge Wells ===
Rural Tunbridge Wells (3 seats)
| Party | Candidate | Votes | % | ±% |
|---|---|---|---|---|
| Conservative | Lynne Darrah | 1,034 | 37.7 | |
| Conservative | Thomas Mobbs | 904 | 33.0 | |
| Alliance | David Knight* | 887 | 32.3 | |
| Conservative | Jill Andrew | 863 | 31.5 | |
| Alliance | Alison Webster* | 786 | 28.7 | |
| Green | Jenny Fox | 532 | 19.4 | |
| Green | Geoff Mason | 439 | 16.0 | |
| Liberal Democrats | Quentin Rappoport | 367 | 13.4 | |
| Liberal Democrats | Gillian Douglass | 356 | 13.0 | |
| IfTW | Paul Glazier | 331 | 12.1 | |
| Green | Helen Yeo | 329 | 12.0 | |
| Labour | Kevin Kerrigan | 300 | 10.9 | |
| Liberal Democrats | Michael Gill | 275 | 10.0 | |
| Labour | Andrew Scott | 254 | 9.3 | |
| Turnout | | 2,751 | 35.1 | |
| Registered electors | | 7,828 | | |
| Conservative win (new seat) | | | | |
| Conservative win (new seat) | | | | |
| Alliance win (new seat) | | | | |

=== Rusthall & Speldhurst ===
Rusthall & Speldhurst (3 seats)
| Party | Candidate | Votes | % | ±% |
|---|---|---|---|---|
| Labour | Jayne Sharratt* | 1,004 | 30.9 | |
| Alliance | Matthew Sankey* | 975 | 30.0 | |
| Labour | Alex Britcher-Allan* | 886 | 27.3 | |
| Alliance | Paul Curry* | 828 | 25.5 | |
| Liberal Democrats | Rebecca Leach | 760 | 23.4 | |
| Liberal Democrats | Martin Franklin | 727 | 22.4 | |
| Liberal Democrats | John Moreland | 697 | 21.4 | |
| Labour | Phil Wheeler | 687 | 21.1 | |
| Conservative | Harry Allen* | 662 | 20.4 | |
| Conservative | Aaron Brand | 612 | 18.8 | |
| Conservative | James McInroy | 597 | 18.4 | |
| Green | Stephanie Gandon | 274 | 8.4 | |
| Reform | Mike Hardy | 172 | 5.3 | |
| IfTW | Graham Withers | 170 | 5.2 | |
| Turnout | | 3,257 | 44.3 | |
| Registered electors | | 7,349 | | |
| Labour win (new seat) | | | | |
| Alliance win (new seat) | | | | |
| Labour win (new seat) | | | | |

=== Sherwood ===
Sherwood (3 seats)
| Party | Candidate | Votes | % | ±% |
|---|---|---|---|---|
| Labour | Hugh Pound* | 721 | 39.2 | |
| Labour | Victoria Jones | 692 | 37.6 | |
| Conservative | Christian Atwood | 681 | 37.1 | |
| Conservative | Lynne Weatherly | 671 | 36.5 | |
| Labour | Shadi Rogers* | 661 | 36.0 | |
| Conservative | Richard Harrington | 647 | 35.2 | |
| Green | Sue Lovell | 225 | 12.2 | |
| Liberal Democrats | William Healing | 213 | 11.6 | |
| IfTW | Joe Dore | 200 | 10.9 | |
| Liberal Democrats | Marguerita Morton* | 188 | 10.2 | |
| Liberal Democrats | Yvonne Raptis | 175 | 9.5 | |
| Turnout | | 1,844 | 29.1 | |
| Registered electors | | 6,345 | | |
| Labour hold | | | | |
| Labour hold | | | | |
| Conservative hold | | | | |

=== Southborough & Bidborough ===
Southborough & Bidborough (3 seats)
| Party | Candidate | Votes | % | ±% |
|---|---|---|---|---|
| Liberal Democrats | Mark Ellis* | 1,059 | 35.6 | |
| Liberal Democrats | Brendon Le Page* | 1,037 | 34.8 | |
| Liberal Democrats | Joe Opara* | 917 | 30.8 | |
| Labour | Penny Breedon | 800 | 26.9 | |
| Conservative | Sarah Bridges | 795 | 26.7 | |
| Conservative | Peter Oakford | 792 | 26.6 | |
| Conservative | Alexander Puffette | 717 | 24.1 | |
| Labour | John Francis* | 708 | 23.8 | |
| Labour | Alain Lewis* | 683 | 23.0 | |
| IfTW | Lorenzo Colangelo | 347 | 11.7 | |
| Green | Mark McBennett | 275 | 9.2 | |
| Alliance | Jonathan Farina | 213 | 7.2 | |
| Turnout | | 2,986 | 40.7 | |
| Registered electors | | 7,330 | | |
| Liberal Democrats win (new seat) | | | | |
| Liberal Democrats win (new seat) | | | | |
| Liberal Democrats win (new seat) | | | | |

=== St. James' ===
St. James' (3 seats)
| Party | Candidate | Votes | % | ±% |
|---|---|---|---|---|
| Liberal Democrats | Ben Chapelard* | 1,427 | 66.1 | |
| Liberal Democrats | Rob Wormington* | 1,024 | 47.4 | |
| Liberal Democrats | Courtney Souper | 957 | 44.3 | |
| Green | Maria Gavin | 423 | 19.6 | |
| Labour | Darren Moore | 408 | 18.9 | |
| Alliance | Kit Hawes-Webb | 370 | 17.1 | |
| Labour | Chris Stevenson | 357 | 16.5 | |
| Conservative | Misha Mitchem | 255 | 11.8 | |
| Conservative | Christopher Woodward | 246 | 11.4 | |
| Conservative | Jamie Tucker | 243 | 11.3 | |
| IfTW | Colin Nicholson | 128 | 5.9 | |
| IfTW | Liberty Richardson | 117 | 5.4 | |
| Turnout | | 2,168 | 35.8 | |
| Registered electors | | 6,050 | | |
| Liberal Democrats hold | | | | |
| Liberal Democrats hold | | | | |
| Liberal Democrats win (new seat) | | | | |

=== St. John's ===
St. John's (2 seats)
| Party | Candidate | Votes | % | ±% |
|---|---|---|---|---|
| Liberal Democrats | Peter Lidstone* | 855 | 50.4 | |
| Liberal Democrats | Matt Fox | 810 | 47.7 | |
| Labour | Dariel Francis | 446 | 26.3 | |
| Labour | Maura Faulkner | 419 | 24.7 | |
| Conservative | Alexander Lewis-Gray | 221 | 13.0 | |
| Conservative | Rebecca Winter | 194 | 11.4 | |
| Green | Adrian Thorne | 124 | 7.3 | |
| IfTW | Fran Colangelo | 99 | 5.8 | |
| IfTW | Mark Nicholson | 53 | 3.1 | |
| Turnout | | 1,700 | 40.4 | |
| Registered electors | | 4,209 | | |
| Liberal Democrats hold | | | | |
| Liberal Democrats hold | | | | |

== Changes 2024–2026 ==
- March 2025: Peter Lidston (Liberal Democrats) and Tara Matthews (Liberal Democrats) resign, triggering by-elections in St John's and Park wards.
- May 2025: Richard Brown and Simon Davidson win the Park and St John's by-elections respectively.
- August 2025: David Knight leaves the Tunbridge Wells Alliance to sit as an independent.
- September 2025: Matthew Fox (Liberal Democrats) resigns from St John's ward, triggering a by-election, and David Knight joins the Conservative Party.
- October 2025: Ukonu Obasi wins the St John's by-election.
- 2026: Vic Jones (Labour) resigns from Sherwood ward and Brendon Le Page (Liberal Democrats) resigns from Southborough and Bidborough ward, creating double-vacancy elections at the 2026 election.

== By-elections ==
=== Park ===
Park by-election: 1 May 2025
| Party | Candidate | Votes | % | ±% |
|---|---|---|---|---|
| Liberal Democrats | Richard Brown | 973 | 38.4 | +6.1 |
| Conservative | Sedat Zorba | 448 | 17.7 | –1.8 |
| Alliance | Nick Pope | 416 | 16.4 | –6.1 |
| Reform | John Spence | 405 | 16.0 | +10.4 |
| Green | Jeremy Clapham | 179 | 7.1 | –4.2 |
| Labour | Kate McAlpine | 110 | 4.3 | –4.5 |
| Majority | | 525 | 20.7 | N/A |
| Turnout | | 2,538 | 38.0 | –4.2 |
| Registered electors | | 6,688 | | |
| Liberal Democrats hold | | Swing | ▲4.0 | |

The by-election was triggered by the resignation of Liberal Democrat councillor Tara Matthews.

=== St Johns (May 2025) ===
St Johns by-election: 1 May 2025
| Party | Candidate | Votes | % | ±% |
|---|---|---|---|---|
| Liberal Democrats | Simon Davidson | 780 | 51.1 | +3.5 |
| Reform | Chris Hoare | 247 | 16.2 | N/A |
| Conservative | Alex Grey | 171 | 11.2 | –1.1 |
| Labour Co-op | Alan Bullion | 126 | 8.3 | –16.5 |
| Green | Kate Sergeant | 111 | 7.3 | +0.4 |
| Alliance | Kit Hawes-Webb | 62 | 4.1 | N/A |
| IfTW | Joe Dore | 28 | 1.8 | N/A |
| Majority | | 533 | 34.9 | N/A |
| Turnout | | 1,529 | 36.2 | –4.2 |
| Registered electors | | 4,223 | | |
| Liberal Democrats hold | | | | |

The by-election was triggered by the resignation of Liberal Democrat councillor Peter Lidston.

=== St Johns (October 2025) ===
St Johns by-election: 30 October 2025
| Party | Candidate | Votes | % | ±% |
|---|---|---|---|---|
| Liberal Democrats | Ukonu Obasi | 629 | 53.3 | +4.3 |
| Reform | Chris Hoare | 177 | 15.0 | N/A |
| Green | Kate Sergeant | 160 | 13.5 | +6.4 |
| Alliance | Kit Hawes-Webb | 105 | 8.9 | N/A |
| Conservative | David Sumner | 90 | 7.6 | –5.1 |
| IfTW | Joe Dore | 20 | 1.7 | N/A |
| Majority | | 452 | 38.3 | N/A |
| Turnout | | 1,183 | 28.4 | –12.0 |
| Registered electors | | 4,159 | | |
| Liberal Democrats hold | | | | |

The by-election was triggered by the resignation of Liberal Democrat councillor Matthew Fox.
