= Tunbridge Wells Alliance =

- Leader: Ellen Neville
- Founded: 26 February 2018; 8 years ago
- Headquarters: Tunbridge Wells, Kent
- Ideology: Localism; NIMBYism (Alleged)
- Colours: Light Blue
- Tunbridge Wells Borough Council: 4 / 39

Website
- www.twalliance.org

The Tunbridge Wells Alliance is a local political party based in the Borough of Tunbridge Wells. It currently has three councillors on the opposition of Tunbridge Wells Borough Council.

The party does not have a whip. It has been described as "development sceptic".

== History ==
The party was founded in 2018 to oppose the construction of a civic centre, and to "ensure a balance between development and conservation".

The first election contested by the party was the 2018 Tunbridge Wells Borough Council election, where they elected one councillor: party leader Nicholas Pope.

After the 2022 Borough Council election, the party had nine councillors and joined a coalition administration with the Liberal Democrats and Labour. This brought to an end 24 years of Conservative leadership of the council.

In August 2023, the party's former leader, David Hayward, left to form his own party called "Independents for Tunbridge Wells". He claimed that the Alliance had become "shackled and subservient to the Lib Dems" because of their coalition together.

After the 2024 Borough council election, the party was reduced to four councillors and was no longer part of the administration as the Liberal Democrats now had a majority on the council.
