= Borough of Tunbridge Wells =

Coordinates: 51°07′44″N 0°15′39″E

- Borough and non-metropolitan district
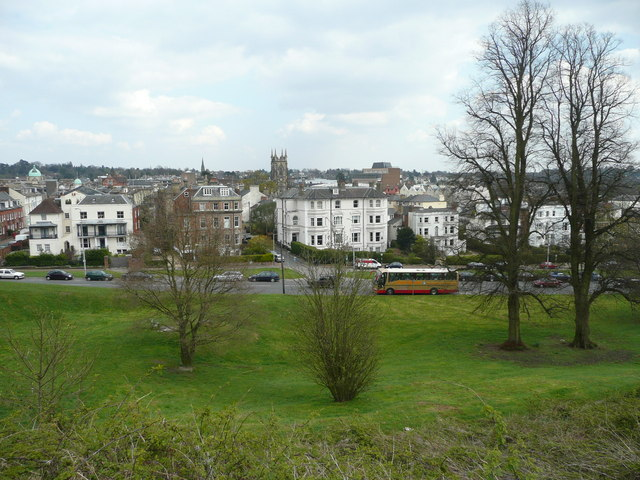
- Tunbridge Wells skyline

- Tunbridge Wells shown within Kent
- Sovereign state: United Kingdom
- Constituent country: England
- Region: South East England
- Non-metropolitan county: Kent
- Status: Non-metropolitan district
- Admin HQ: Royal Tunbridge Wells
- Incorporated: 1 April 1974

Government
  - Type: Non-metropolitan district council
  - Body: Tunbridge Wells Borough Council
  - MPs: Mike Martin; Helen Grant

Area
  - Total: 127.9 sq mi (331.3 km^{2})
  - Rank: 112th (of 296)

Population (2024)
  - Total: 119,694
  - Rank: 209th (of 296)
  - Density: 935.7/sq mi (361.3/km^{2})

Ethnicity (2021)
  - Ethnic groups: List: 91.5% White; 4% Asian; 2.6% Mixed; 1% Black; 1% other

Religion (2021)
  - Religion: List: 49.7% Christianity; 40.3% no religion; 6.3% not stated; 1.7% Islam; 1% Hinduism; 0.5% other; 0.4% Buddhism; 0.2% Judaism; 0.1% Sikhism
- Time zone: UTC0 (GMT)
  - Summer (DST): UTC+1 (BST)
- ONS code: 29UQ
- GSS code: E07000116
- OS grid reference: TQ5817739112

The Borough of Tunbridge Wells is a local government district with borough status in Kent, England. It takes its name from its main town, Royal Tunbridge Wells. The borough also contains the towns of Paddock Wood and Southborough, along with numerous villages and surrounding rural areas. Large parts of the borough fall within the High Weald Area of Outstanding Natural Beauty.

The neighbouring districts are Sevenoaks, Tonbridge and Malling, Maidstone, Ashford, Rother and Wealden.

Under current local government reorganisation plans, all district councils in Kent, as well as the county council, will be abolished in 2028, with the district becoming part of a new West Kent unitary authority.

== History ==
The town of Tunbridge Wells had been governed by improvement commissioners from 1835. The commissioners' district was reconstituted as a local government district in 1860, which in turn became a municipal borough in 1889. That first borough of Tunbridge Wells was renamed "Royal Tunbridge Wells" in 1909 following a petition from the borough council to Edward VII.

The modern district was created on 1 April 1974 under the Local Government Act 1972, covering the whole area of three former districts and parts of a fourth, which were all abolished at the same time:

- Cranbrook Rural District
- Tonbridge Rural District (except parishes of Hadlow and Hildenborough, which went to Tonbridge and Malling)
- Royal Tunbridge Wells Municipal Borough
- Southborough Urban District

The new district was named Tunbridge Wells after the area's largest town, but without the Royal prefix. The district was not initially granted borough status. The council resolved to petition for it in June 1974 and a borough charter was received on 20 December 1974, allowing the chair of the council to take the title mayor.

== Governance ==
Tunbridge Wells Borough Council

Type
- Type: Non-metropolitan district

History
- Founded: 1 April 1974

Leadership
- Mayor: Bev Palmer, Conservative since 20 May 2026
- Leader: Ben Chapelard, Liberal Democrat since 25 May 2022
- Chief Executive: William Benson since 2010

Structure
- Seats: 39 councillors
- Political groups: Administration (26) Liberal Democrats (26) Other parties (13) Conservative (6) Labour (3) Alliance (3) Independent (1)

Elections
- Voting system: First past the post
- Last election: May 2026

Meeting place
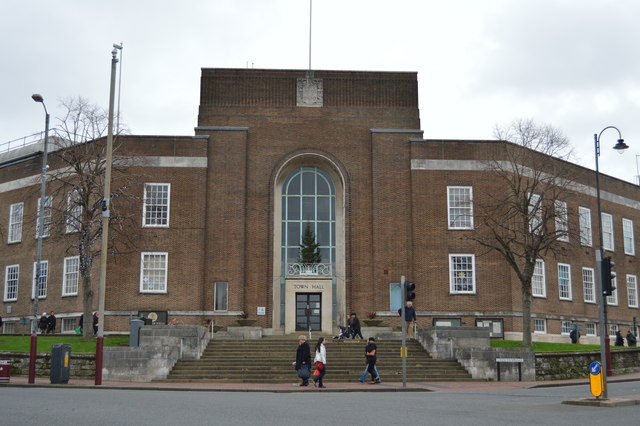
- Town Hall, Mount Pleasant Road, Royal Tunbridge Wells, TN1 1RS

Website
- www.tunbridgewells.gov.uk

Tunbridge Wells Borough Council provides district-level services. County-level services are provided by Kent County Council. Much of the borough is also covered by civil parishes, which form a third tier of local government.

=== Political control ===
The council has been under Liberal Democrat majority control since the 2024 election.

The first election to the council was held in 1973, initially operating as a shadow authority alongside the outgoing authorities before coming into its powers on 1 April 1974. Political control of the council since 1974 has been as follows:

Party in control	Years
Conservative	1974–1994
No overall control	1994–1996
Liberal Democrats	1996–1998
Conservative	1998–2021
No overall control	2021–2024
Liberal Democrats	2024–present

=== Leadership ===
The role of mayor is largely ceremonial in Tunbridge Wells. Political leadership is instead provided by the leader of the council. The leaders since 1998 have been:

Councillor	Party	From	To
James Scholes	Conservative	1998	May 2002
Len Horwood	Conservative	May 2002	Jun 2004
Melvyn Howell	Conservative	30 Jun 2004	May 2007
Roy Bullock	Conservative	23 May 2007	Jan 2011
Bob Atwood	Conservative	19 Jan 2011	May 2012
David Jukes	Conservative	23 May 2012	May 2019
Alan McDermott	Conservative	22 May 2019	23 May 2021
Tom Dawlings	Conservative	26 May 2021	May 2022
Ben Chapelard	Liberal Democrats	25 May 2022	

=== Composition ===
Following the 2026 election, the composition of the council was:

Party	Councillors
Liberal Democrats	25
Conservative	7
Labour	3
Alliance	3
Independent	1
Total	39

=== Elections ===
Since the last boundary changes in 2024 the council has comprised 39 councillors representing 14 wards, with each ward electing one, two or three councillors. Elections are held three years out of every four, with a third of the council being elected each time for a four year term of office. Kent County Council elections are held in the fourth year of the cycle when there are no borough council elections.

In the 2016 European Union referendum, Tunbridge Wells was the only district in Kent that voted to remain in the EU (54.89%).

=== Premises ===
The council is based at Tunbridge Wells Town Hall on Mount Pleasant Road, which had been completed in 1941 for the old Royal Tunbridge Wells Borough Council.

== Geography ==
The borough of Tunbridge Wells lies along the south western border of Kent, partly on the northern edge of the Weald, the remainder on the Weald Clay plain in the upper reaches of the rivers Teise and Beult.

Much of the borough lies within the High Weald, a designated Area of Outstanding Natural Beauty. The presence of sandstone outcrops and the chalybeate springs, together with old workings, point to ancient iron manufacturing in the area.

The Weald Clay plain along the northern edge of the borough forms part of the so-called Garden of England, named for its extensive orchards and former hop farms, sheep and cattle. A string of villages lies across this plain, from Brenchley and Horsmonden to Benenden and Headcorn.

== Transport ==
The main roads through the borough are the A21 London to Hastings road and in the east, the A229, which runs from the A21 at Hurst Green through Cranbrook to Maidstone.

There is a railway line across the clay plain in an almost unbroken straight line between Redhill, Tonbridge and Ashford, Kent. The SER line to Hastings passes through Tunbridge Wells; here there was once a further branch connection south-eastwards to Groombridge, and at Paddock Wood is the southern terminus of the Medway Valley Line to Maidstone.

== Media ==
The BBC has its regional centre at the Great Hall on Mount Pleasant Road in Royal Tunbridge Wells. It is the base of BBC Radio Kent and for BBC South East regional programmes, the complex contains studios and offices. ITV Meridian also covers the area but broadcast from its studios in Whiteley in Hampshire. Other radio stations that broadcast to the area are Heart South, Gold, and community based radio stations: KMFM West Kent and West Kent Radio. The area is served by the local newspaper, Kent and Sussex Courier.

== Places of interest ==
Apart from Tunbridge Wells itself, places of interest in the Borough include:

- Bedgebury Pinetum
- Bewl Water reservoir near Lamberhurst for leisure water pursuits and outdoor conferences
- Sissinghurst Castle gardens: the home of Vita Sackville-West
- facilities for rock-climbing at the 'High Rocks', 2 miles west of Tunbridge Wells

== See also ==
- List of places of worship in Tunbridge Wells (borough)
- Listed buildings in the borough of Tunbridge Wells, Kent
