= Listed buildings in the borough of Tunbridge Wells, Kent =

There are about 1,900 Listed Buildings in the borough of Tunbridge Wells, which are buildings of architectural historic interest.

- Grade I buildings are of exceptional interest.
- Grade II* buildings are particularly important buildings of more than special interest.
- Grade II buildings are of special interest.

The lists follow Historic England’s geographical organisation, with entries grouped by county, local authority, and parish (civil and non-civil). The following lists are arranged by parish.

parish	Listed buildings list	Grade I	Grade II*	Grade II	Total
Benenden	Listed buildings in Benenden				
Bidborough	Listed buildings in Bidborough				
Brenchley and Matfield	Listed buildings in Brenchley and Matfield				
Capel	Listed buildings in Capel, Kent				
Cranbrook and Sissinghurst	Listed buildings in Cranbrook and Sissinghurst	6	17	294	317
Frittenden	Listed buildings in Frittenden				
Goudhurst	Listed buildings in Goudhurst				
Hawkhurst	Listed buildings in Hawkhurst	1	6	132	139
Horsmonden	Listed buildings in Horsmonden				
Kilndown	no listed buildings				
Lamberhurst	Listed buildings in Lamberhurst	3	1	136	140
Matfield	no listed buildings				
Paddock Wood	Listed buildings in Paddock Wood				
Pembury	Listed buildings in Pembury	1	2	73	76
Royal Tunbridge Wells	Listed buildings in Royal Tunbridge Wells	1	35	254	290
Rusthall	Listed buildings in Rusthall				
Sandhurst	Listed buildings in Sandhurst, Kent				
Southborough	Listed buildings in Southborough, Kent				
Speldhurst	Listed buildings in Speldhurst				
