= Bidborough Windmill =

Windmill in Bidborough, Kent, England

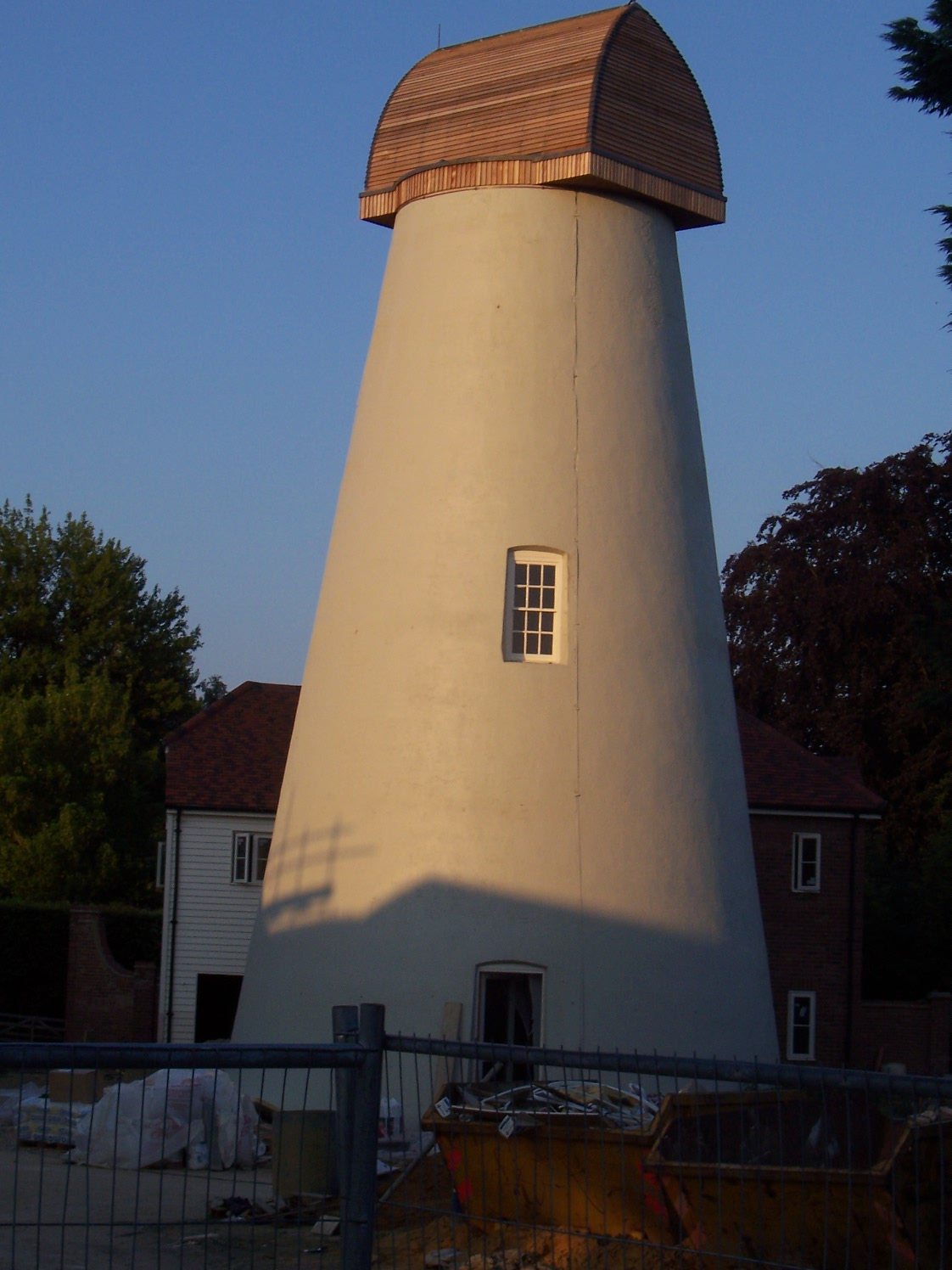
- Bidborough Windmill, June 2006

Origin
- Grid reference: TQ 562 435
- Coordinates: 51°10′8″N 0°13′55″E
- Year built: 1858

Information
- Purpose: Corn mill
- Type: Tower mill
- Storeys: Four storeys
- No. of sails: Four
- Type of sails: Patent sails
- Windshaft: Cast iron
- Winding: Fantail
- Fantail blades: Six blades
- Auxiliary power: External engine

Bidborough Mill is a Grade II listed, house converted tower mill west of Bidborough, Kent, England. It is now incorporated into a housing development called Mill Court, on the south side of the B2176 Penshurst Road.

== History ==
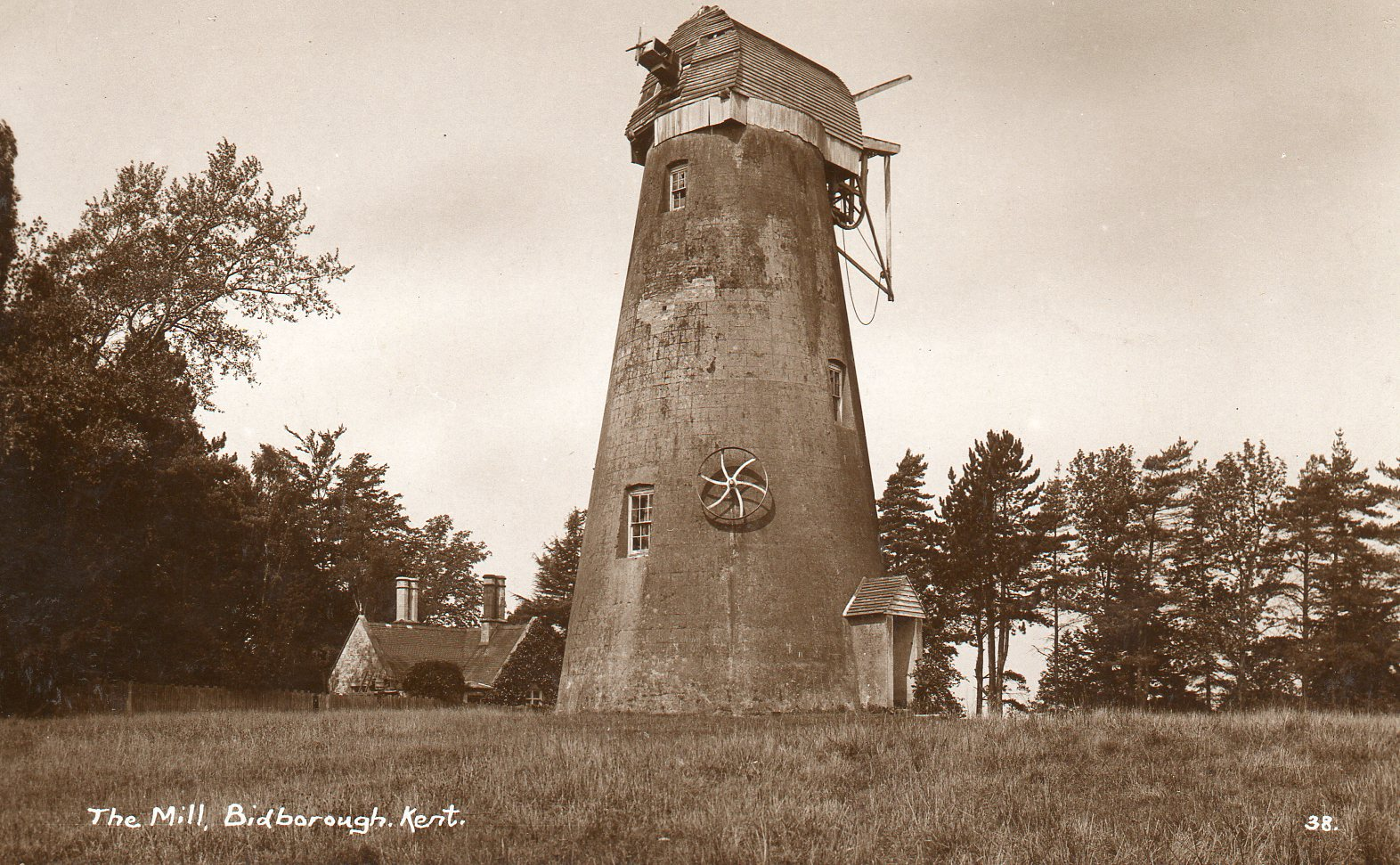
Bidborough Mill in the 1920s

Bidborough Mill may be an eighteenth-century tower mill, or an 1858 replacement for an earlier mill. Parish records from 1759, 1763 and 1765 mention the purchase of flour for the relief of the poor. A mill was marked on Andrews, Drury and Herbert's map of 1769. The date of the building of Bidborough Mill is unknown for certain (see above). In the 1890s, the mill was being worked in conjunction with a watermill at Speldhurst. The mill had four patent sails. The mill was struck by lightning c.1900 and lost two sails. This was the end of the mill's working life and the other two sails were removed a few years later. There was a proposal to erect an iron windpump on the mill in the 1930s but this was not carried out. In 1942, the cap roof and windshaft were blown off the mill. A replacement cap was made in 1949, but later replaced with a flat roof. The mill was house converted in 2006 and a replica cap was made and fitted on 1 May 2006.

== Description ==
Bidborough Mill is a four-storey brick tower mill, partly rendered with cement. It had a Kentish-style cap, four single patent sails and was winded by a fantail. The millstones were driven underdrift. A large pulley on the outside of the mill at first-floor level allowed the mill to be driven by belt from a traction engine or tractor, via a gear bolted to the underside of the Great Spur Wheel. A wheat cleaner and a flour dresser remained in the mill before conversion.

== Millers ==
- William Weaver 1759 - 1765
- Nicholas Arnold 1839 - 1845
- T Arnold 1851 - 1867
- William Reeves 1870
- G W Young 1874
- George Wood 1878
- Albert Oliver 1890 - 1891
- Oliver & Morris 1895
- Joseph Tabraham 1899

References for above.
