= Bidborough =

Village in Kent, England

Coordinates: 51.1693°N 0.2371°E

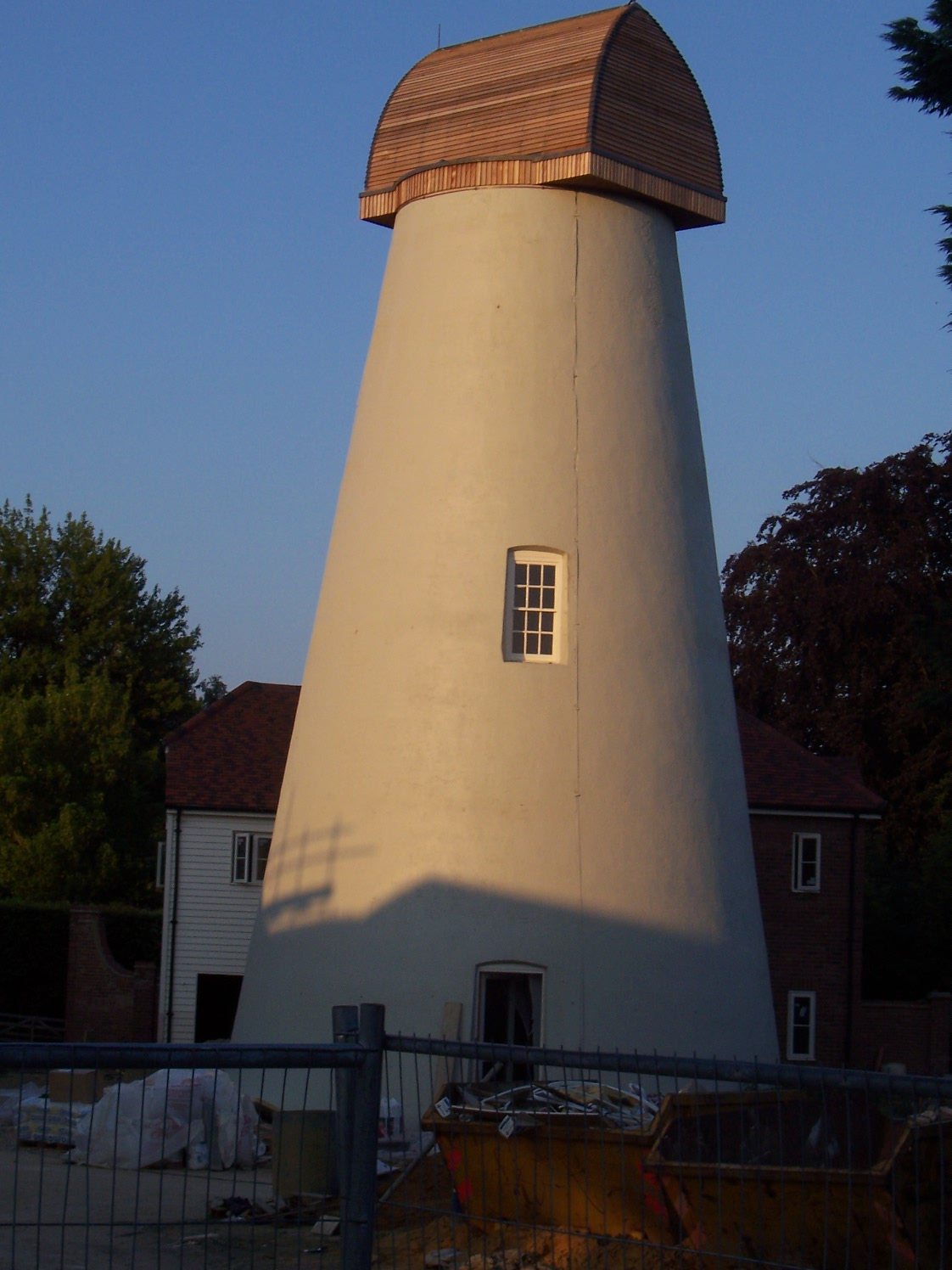
- Bidborough Windmill, June 2006

- Location within Kent
- Population: 958 (2001 census); 1,163 (2011 Census)
- OS grid reference: TQ565435
- Civil parish: Bidborough
- District: Tunbridge Wells
- Shire county: Kent
- Region: South East
- Country: England
- Sovereign state: United Kingdom
- Post town: Tunbridge Wells
- Postcode district: TN3
- Dialling code: 01892
- Police: Kent
- Fire: Kent
- Ambulance: South East Coast
- UK Parliament: Tunbridge Wells

Bidborough is a village and civil parish in the borough of Tunbridge Wells in Kent, England, north of Royal Tunbridge Wells and south of Tonbridge. According to the 2001 census it had a population of 958, increasing to 1,163 at the 2011 Census.

== Amenities ==
Amenities include the primary school, the 'Kentish Hare' pub (purchased in 2012 by a local resident and extensively refurbished), the historic 11th-century church of St Lawrence, and nearby community hall. The village has its own amateur dramatic group, 'BDS', which puts on productions twice a year, as well as a youth group, Women's Institute and a gardening association. The village also has its own garage, shop and used to have a post office that closed in 2008.

Sports facilities include a tennis court, a bowls green and two recreation ground areas, which are available for cricket and five-a-side football.

== Transport ==
Buses 231/233 connect Bidborough to Edenbridge and Tunbridge Wells. The bus 235 links Leigh to Bidborough and Tunbridge Wells. The bus 237 links Chiddingstone to Bidborough and Tunbridge Wells.

== See also ==
- Listed buildings in Bidborough
