= Listed buildings in Sandhurst, Kent =

Civil Parish in Kent, England

Sandhurst is a village and civil parish in the Borough of Tunbridge Wells of Kent, England. It contains 96 listed buildings that are recorded in the National Heritage List for England. Of these four are grade II* and 92 are grade II.

This list is based on the information retrieved online from Historic England.

== Key ==
Grade	Criteria
I	Buildings that are of exceptional interest
II*	Particularly important buildings of more than special interest
II	Buildings that are of special interest

== Listing ==
Name	Grade	Location	Type	Completed (Note: The date given is the date used by Historic England as significant for the initial building or that of an important part in the structure's description.)	Date designated	Grid ref. (Note: The grid reference is based on the British national grid reference system, sometimes known as OSGB36, used by the Ordnance Survey.) Geo-coordinates	Notes	Entry number (Note: The "List Entry Number" is a unique number assigned to each listed building and scheduled monument by Historic England.)	Image	Wikidata
Broad Oak House Oak View	II	Back Road			5 July 1993	TQ8004828288; 51°01′33″N 0°33′58″E		1336736	Upload Photo	Q26621213
Fairview Cottages	II	1-4, Back Road			5 November 1990	TQ7990928325; 51°01′34″N 0°33′51″E		1281134	Upload Photo	Q26570204
General Stores and Attached Property	II	Back Road			5 July 1993	TQ8008228282; 51°01′33″N 0°34′00″E		1204564	Upload Photo	Q26499996
Oaks Farm	II	Back Road			5 July 1993	TQ8000828289; 51°01′33″N 0°33′56″E		1085206	Upload Photo	Q26371301
Brick House Farmhouse	II	Bodiam Road			5 July 1993	TQ7964028108; 51°01′27″N 0°33′37″E		1336737	Upload Photo	Q26621214
Bryn Tirion Manor Cottage the Manor House	II	Bodiam Road			5 July 1993	TQ7976928367; 51°01′36″N 0°33′44″E		1204673	Upload Photo	Q26500094
Castle Gate	II	Bodiam Road			5 July 1993	TQ7931027902; 51°01′21″N 0°33′19″E		1085207	Upload Photo	Q26371308
Cherry Tree Cottage	II	Bodiam Road			5 July 1993	TQ7894227790; 51°01′18″N 0°33′00″E		1204586	Upload Photo	Q26500016
Cotmans	II	Bodiam Road			5 July 1993	TQ7980328408; 51°01′37″N 0°33′45″E		1085208	Upload Photo	Q26371313
Cowbeech	II	Bodiam Road			20 June 1967	TQ7976128278; 51°01′33″N 0°33′43″E		1204591	Upload Photo	Q26500019
Cowbeech Cottage	II	Bodiam Road			5 July 1993	TQ7975128266; 51°01′32″N 0°33′43″E		1336738	Upload Photo	Q26621215
Cross Cottages Old Priest's Cottage Periwinkle Cottage	II	2 and 1, Bodiam Road			9 June 1952	TQ7887627770; 51°01′17″N 0°32′57″E		1281143	Upload Photo	Q26570214
Greenside Cottage	II	Bodiam Road			5 July 1993	TQ7979328398; 51°01′37″N 0°33′45″E		1204641	Upload Photo	Q26500063
Old Priests House	II	Bodiam Road			9 June 1952	TQ7885227773; 51°01′17″N 0°32′56″E		1085209	Upload Photo	Q26371320
Old Swan House	II	Bodiam Road	house		5 July 1993	TQ7974828359; 51°01′35″N 0°33′43″E		1204659	Old Swan House More images	Q26500080
Old Tavern	II	Bodiam Road			5 July 1993	TQ7901927816; 51°01′19″N 0°33′04″E		1336739	Upload Photo	Q26621216
Store to Old Chapel House	II	Bodiam Road			5 July 1993	TQ7953328218; 51°01′31″N 0°33′31″E		1204665	Upload Photo	Q26500086
Swan Cottage	II	Bodiam Road			5 July 1993	TQ7973928351; 51°01′35″N 0°33′42″E		1085210	Upload Photo	Q26371326
Tanyard Farmhouse	II	Bodiam Road			5 July 1993	TQ7972228322; 51°01′34″N 0°33′41″E		1336740	Upload Photo	Q26621217
Bourne Farmhouse	II	Bourne Lane			20 June 1967	TQ7807528032; 51°01′27″N 0°32′16″E		1085211	Upload Photo	Q26371332
Ives Cottages	II	Bourne Lane			5 July 1993	TQ7845827759; 51°01′17″N 0°32′35″E		1204675	Upload Photo	Q26500096
Church of St Nicholas	II*	Church Road	church building		20 June 1967	TQ7905627308; 51°01′02″N 0°33′05″E		1085172	Church of St Nicholas More images	Q17547366
Monument Approximately 1 Metre South Monument to Mary Collins at St Nicholas Church	II	Church Road			5 July 1993	TQ7904927288; 51°01′02″N 0°33′05″E		1085173	Upload Photo	Q26371117
Monument to Howard Ward Approximately 6 Metres West of West Tower at St Nicholas Church	II	Church Road			5 July 1993	TQ7902627310; 51°01′02″N 0°33′04″E		1336760	Upload Photo	Q26621237
Monument to Mary Collins Approximately 5 Metres South of West Tower at St Nicholas Church	II	Church Road			5 July 1993	TQ7904827296; 51°01′02″N 0°33′05″E		1336759	Upload Photo	Q26621236
Mounting Block to North of St Nicholas Church	II	Church Road			5 July 1993	TQ7904027325; 51°01′03″N 0°33′04″E		1085174	Upload Photo	Q26371121
Oasthouse at Old Place	II	Church Road			5 July 1993	TQ7919227002; 51°00′52″N 0°33′12″E		1336741	Upload Photo	Q26621218
Old Place	II	Church Road			5 July 1993	TQ7910727067; 51°00′54″N 0°33′07″E		1281084	Upload Photo	Q26570160
Stables and Hayloft at Old Place	II	Church Road			5 July 1993	TQ7913027095; 51°00′55″N 0°33′09″E		1085171	Upload Photo	Q26371111
The Old Rectory	II	Church Road			5 July 1993	TQ7880927632; 51°01′13″N 0°32′53″E		1085176	Upload Photo	Q26371133
Ward Monument Approximately 2 Metres North East of North Porch at St Nicholas Church	II	Church Road			5 July 1993	TQ7906027321; 51°01′03″N 0°33′05″E		1085175	Upload Photo	Q26371129
Ward Monument Approximately 7 Metres West of West Tower at St Nicholas Church	II	Church Road			5 July 1993	TQ7901927309; 51°01′02″N 0°33′03″E		1336761	Upload Photo	Q26621238
Nightingale Cottage	II	Conghurst Road			5 July 1993	TQ7727529249; 51°02′07″N 0°31′37″E		1085177	Upload Photo	Q26371140
Barn at Puxtye Farm	II	Crouch Lane			5 July 1993	TQ8074728545; 51°01′40″N 0°34′34″E		1085178	Upload Photo	Q26371145
Hoad's Farmhouse	II	Crouch Lane			20 June 1967	TQ8104628623; 51°01′42″N 0°34′50″E		1281094	Upload Photo	Q26570170
Hope House Farmhouse	II	Crouch Lane			5 July 1993	TQ8153829594; 51°02′13″N 0°35′17″E		1085179	Upload Photo	Q26371151
Hope Oasts	II	Crouch Lane			5 July 1993	TQ8148829546; 51°02′12″N 0°35′14″E		1204711	Upload Photo	Q26500128
Oasthouse at Puxtye Farm	II	Crouch Lane			13 February 1991	TQ8077628547; 51°01′40″N 0°34′36″E		1085180	Upload Photo	Q26371157
Puxtye Farmhouse	II	Crouch Lane			5 July 1993	TQ8080928549; 51°01′40″N 0°34′37″E		1204717	Upload Photo	Q26500134
Ethnam	II	Ethnam Lane			20 June 1967	TQ8125027042; 51°00′51″N 0°34′57″E		1336762	Upload Photo	Q26621239
Little Boxhurst	II	Ethnam Lane			20 June 1967	TQ8106627393; 51°01′03″N 0°34′48″E		1281068	Upload Photo	Q26570147
Foxhole	II	Hinksden Lane			5 July 1993	TQ7840430510; 51°02′46″N 0°32′37″E		1085181	Upload Photo	Q26371162
Lomas	II	Lomas Lane			20 June 1967	TQ8178128279; 51°01′30″N 0°35′27″E		1204743	Upload Photo	Q26500158
Marsh Quarter Farmhouse	II	Marsh Quarter Lane			5 July 1993	TQ8029426570; 51°00′37″N 0°34′07″E		1085182	Upload Photo	Q26371168
Field Green House	II*	Megrims Hill			20 June 1967	TQ7853129661; 51°02′19″N 0°32′42″E		1204749	Upload Photo	Q17547446
Perrins	II	Megrims Hill			5 July 1993	TQ7870529335; 51°02′08″N 0°32′51″E		1336763	Upload Photo	Q26621240
Bayford House	II	Queen Street, TN18 5HR			5 July 1993	TQ7937828603; 51°01′44″N 0°33′24″E		1085157	Upload Photo	Q26371043
Bell Farmhouse Bell House	II	Queen Street			9 June 1952	TQ7987328447; 51°01′38″N 0°33′49″E		1204753	Upload Photo	Q26500167
Clematis Cottage	II	Queen Street			5 July 1993	TQ7971228478; 51°01′39″N 0°33′41″E		1336764	Upload Photo	Q26621241
Little Crouch	II	1-2, Queen Street			5 November 1990	TQ8029028263; 51°01′32″N 0°34′10″E		1085183	Upload Photo	Q26371173
Milestone Opposite Sandhurst Farm Shop	II	Queen Street			5 July 1993	TQ7936028722; 51°01′48″N 0°33′23″E		1204764	Upload Photo	Q26500178
Regency Lodge	II	Queen Street			5 July 1993	TQ7978828463; 51°01′39″N 0°33′45″E		1204762	Upload Photo	Q26500176
Saddlers Cottage	II	Queen Street			5 July 1993	TQ7980628461; 51°01′39″N 0°33′46″E		1085184	Upload Photo	Q26371179
Spar Stores	II	Queen Street			5 July 1993	TQ7981228431; 51°01′38″N 0°33′46″E		1085185	Upload Photo	Q26371185
The Malt House	II	Queen Street, TN18 5HR			20 June 1967	TQ7932328688; 51°01′46″N 0°33′21″E		1280986	Upload Photo	Q26570070
The Old House	II	Queen Street			5 July 1993	TQ7984928454; 51°01′38″N 0°33′48″E		1281044	Upload Photo	Q26570122
White Cottage	II	Queen Street			5 July 1993	TQ7976128448; 51°01′38″N 0°33′43″E		1336765	Upload Photo	Q26621242
Willow House	II	Queen Street			5 July 1993	TQ7978728442; 51°01′38″N 0°33′45″E		1204772	Upload Photo	Q26500184
Rosemeadow Cottage	II	Riseden Lane			5 July 1993	TQ7793829130; 51°02′02″N 0°32′11″E		1085186	Upload Photo	Q26371191
April Cottage Tile Cottage	II	Rye Road			5 July 1993	TQ8143827992; 51°01′22″N 0°35′09″E		1204797	Upload Photo	Q26500205
Baptist Chapel and Former School	II	Rye Road	chapel		20 June 1967	TQ8085828041; 51°01′24″N 0°34′39″E		1336769	Baptist Chapel and Former School More images	Q26621246
Barn and Garage at Boxhurst Farm	II	Rye Road			20 June 1967	TQ8071927639; 51°01′11″N 0°34′31″E		1085150	Upload Photo	Q26371001
Bolingbroke Lower Green	II	Rye Road			5 July 1993	TQ8011928339; 51°01′34″N 0°34′02″E		1204790	Upload Photo	Q26500200
Boxhurst	II	Rye Road			20 June 1967	TQ8069727662; 51°01′12″N 0°34′30″E		1336787	Upload Photo	Q26621263
Burnt Farmhouse	II	Rye Road			20 June 1967	TQ8023228171; 51°01′29″N 0°34′07″E		1336788	Upload Photo	Q26621264
Crouch Cottage and Ringle Crouch Cottage	II	Rye Road			5 July 1993	TQ8025928272; 51°01′32″N 0°34′09″E		1085187	Upload Photo	Q26371196
Dower Cottage Laburnum Cottage Oakfield Cottages Weavers Cottage	II	Rye Road			5 July 1993	TQ8014728323; 51°01′34″N 0°34′03″E		1336766	Upload Photo	Q26621243
Glassocks	II	Rye Road			20 June 1967	TQ8150927696; 51°01′12″N 0°35′12″E		1085152	Upload Photo	Q26371013
Green Gates	II	Rye Road			5 July 1993	TQ8096928042; 51°01′24″N 0°34′45″E		1336789	Upload Photo	Q26621265
Heronden	II	Rye Road			20 June 1967	TQ8201927805; 51°01′15″N 0°35′38″E		1281049	Upload Photo	Q26570127
Linkhill Cottage	II	Rye Road			14 August 1992	TQ8143627955; 51°01′20″N 0°35′08″E		1085151	Upload Photo	Q26371007
Linkhill Cottages	II	1 and 2, Rye Road			14 August 1992	TQ8118827970; 51°01′21″N 0°34′56″E		1085153	Upload Photo	Q26371020
Linkhill House	II	Rye Road			20 June 1967	TQ8139728012; 51°01′22″N 0°35′06″E		1085188	Upload Photo	Q26371202
Memorial to Sarah Martin to North of Baptist Chapel	II	Rye Road			5 July 1993	TQ8085028054; 51°01′24″N 0°34′38″E		1085191	Upload Photo	Q26371220
Memorial to Thomas Petter to North of Baptist Chapel	II	Rye Road			5 July 1993	TQ8086028051; 51°01′24″N 0°34′39″E		1204799	Upload Photo	Q26500207
Milestone Opposite Baptist Church	II	Rye Road			5 July 1993	TQ8083228101; 51°01′26″N 0°34′38″E		1204780	Upload Photo	Q26500191
Oakhurst	II	Rye Road			20 June 1967	TQ8089228031; 51°01′23″N 0°34′41″E		1085154	Upload Photo	Q26371025
Old Well House	II	Rye Road			20 June 1967	TQ8017128313; 51°01′33″N 0°34′04″E		1336767	Upload Photo	Q26621244
Quince Cottage	II	Rye Road			5 July 1993	TQ8006628351; 51°01′35″N 0°33′59″E		1204791	Upload Photo	Q26500201
Ringle Crouch Farmhouse	II	Rye Road			5 July 1993	TQ8052728225; 51°01′30″N 0°34′22″E		1085189	Upload Photo	Q26371209
Rosemullion	II	Rye Road			11 June 1993	TQ8134528041; 51°01′23″N 0°35′04″E		1281054	Upload Photo	Q26570133
Shrewsbury Cottage	II	Rye Road			5 July 1993	TQ8008228340; 51°01′34″N 0°34′00″E		1336768	Upload Photo	Q26621245
South View Tylers Cottage	II	Rye Road			8 June 1993	TQ8004028360; 51°01′35″N 0°33′57″E		1085190	Upload Photo	Q26371216
Stone House	II	Rye Road			20 June 1967	TQ8147227927; 51°01′19″N 0°35′10″E		1085155	Upload Photo	Q26371031
Sunnyside	II	Rye Road			5 July 1993	TQ7994128345; 51°01′35″N 0°33′52″E		1085156	Upload Photo	Q26371037
Tower House	II	Rye Road			20 June 1967	TQ7987328387; 51°01′36″N 0°33′49″E		1204886	Upload Photo	Q26500286
Downsgate	II	Silverden Lane			20 June 1967	TQ7873728564; 51°01′43″N 0°32′51″E		1085158	Upload Photo	Q26371049
Silverden	II	Silverden Lane			5 July 1993	TQ7889928220; 51°01′32″N 0°32′59″E		1280987	Upload Photo	Q26570071
Alderden Old Manor and Alderden Manor	II*	Sponden Lane, TN18 5NR			9 June 1952	TQ7961529154; 51°02′01″N 0°33′37″E		1085159	Upload Photo	Q17547360
Beeches Farm	II	Sponden Lane, TN18 5NP			20 June 1967	TQ7863529567; 51°02′16″N 0°32′48″E		1204909	Upload Photo	Q26500307
Field Green Cottage	II	Sponden Lane, Cranbrook, TN18 5NP			5 July 1993	TQ7872629638; 51°02′18″N 0°32′52″E		1085160	Upload Photo	Q26371056
Honey Cottage	II	Sponden Lane, TH18 5NR			5 July 1993	TQ7931329028; 51°01′58″N 0°33′21″E		1204912	Upload Photo	Q26500310
Little Sponden	II	Sponden Lane, Tn 18 5nr			5 July 1993	TQ7933829346; 51°02′08″N 0°33′23″E		1336790	Upload Photo	Q26621266
Sponden Old Hall	II*	Sponden Lane, TN18 5NP	architectural structure		5 July 1993	TQ7931329720; 51°02′20″N 0°33′23″E		1280956	Sponden Old Hall More images	Q17547654
Clocktower Monument	II	The Green			5 July 1993	TQ7983628378; 51°01′36″N 0°33′47″E		1085161	Upload Photo	Q26371060
Sandhurst War Memorial	II	The Green	World War I memorial		5 July 1993	TQ7984128399; 51°01′37″N 0°33′47″E		1336752	Sandhurst War Memorial More images	Q26621228

== See also ==
- Grade I listed buildings in Kent
- Grade II* listed buildings in Kent

== Sources ==
- Newman, John (2012) [1969], Kent: West and the Weald, The Buildings of England, New Haven and London: Yale University Press, ISBN 978-0-300-18509-6
