= Listed buildings in Pembury =

Historic structures in Kent, England

Pembury is village and civil parish in the Borough of Tunbridge Wells of Kent, England. It contains one grade I, two grade II* and 73 grade II listed buildings that are recorded in the National Heritage List for England.

This list is based on the information retrieved online from Historic England.

== Key ==
Grade	Criteria
I	Buildings that are of exceptional interest
II*	Particularly important buildings of more than special interest
II	Buildings that are of special interest

== Listing ==
Name	Grade	Location	Type	Completed (Note: The date given is the date used by Historic England as significant for the initial building or that of an important part in the structure's description.)	Date designated	Grid ref. (Note: The grid reference is based on the British national grid reference system, sometimes known as OSGB36, used by the Ordnance Survey.) Geo-coordinates	Notes	Entry number (Note: The "List Entry Number" is a unique number assigned to each listed building and scheduled monument by Historic England.)	Image	Wikidata
Amhurst Hill Farmhouse	II	Amhurst Bank Road			24 August 1990	TQ6325043360; 51°09′58″N 0°20′01″E		1261381	Upload Photo	Q26552337
The Old Mill	II	Amhurst Bank Road			24 August 1990	TQ6322243077; 51°09′49″N 0°19′59″E		1254300	Upload Photo	Q26545979
Carthouse Approximately 40 Metres West of Chalket Farmhouse	II	Chalket Lane			24 August 1990	TQ6236940266; 51°08′19″N 0°19′10″E		1261382	Upload Photo	Q26552338
Chalket Farmhouse	II	Chalket Lane			24 August 1990	TQ6241740279; 51°08′19″N 0°19′13″E		1254301	Upload Photo	Q26545980
Dislingbury Cottages	II	1 And 2, Half Moon Lane			24 August 1990	TQ6264243722; 51°10′11″N 0°19′30″E		1261308	Upload Photo	Q26552268
Kenward	II	Half Moon Lane			24 August 1990	TQ6233843518; 51°10′04″N 0°19′14″E		1254303	Upload Photo	Q26545982
The Almshouses	II	9-19, Hastings Road			20 October 1954	TQ6260140732; 51°08′34″N 0°19′23″E		1254390	Upload Photo	Q26546064
Churchyard Walls Belonging to the Upper Church of St Peter	II	Hastings Road			24 August 1990	TQ6260440629; 51°08′31″N 0°19′23″E		1261313	Churchyard Walls Belonging to the Upper Church of St Peter More images	Q26552273
Pastheap Farmhouse	II	Hastings Road			24 August 1990	TQ6365840218; 51°08′16″N 0°20′17″E		1254391	Upload Photo	Q26546065
Poppingbury	II	Hastings Road			24 August 1990	TQ6293540553; 51°08′28″N 0°19′40″E		1261314	Upload Photo	Q26552274
The Camden Arms	II	Hastings Road			20 October 1954	TQ6250640722; 51°08′34″N 0°19′18″E		1254386	The Camden Arms More images	Q26546061
Upper Church of St Peter	II*	Hastings Road			20 October 1954	TQ6260840643; 51°08′31″N 0°19′23″E		1254389	Upper Church of St Peter More images	Q17547581
Rose Cottage	II	130, Henwood Green Road			24 August 1990	TQ6299741242; 51°08′50″N 0°19′44″E		1254393	Upload Photo	Q26546067
Baileys Farm Cottages	II	44, Henwood Green Road			17 April 1974	TQ6309740680; 51°08′32″N 0°19′49″E		1254392	Upload Photo	Q26546066
Baileys Farmhouse	II	46, Henwood Green Road			24 August 1990	TQ6308340697; 51°08′32″N 0°19′48″E		1261316	Upload Photo	Q26552276
38, HENWOOD GREEN ROAD	II	Henwood Green Road			17 April 1974	TQ6310840680; 51°08′32″N 0°19′49″E		1261315	Upload Photo	Q26552275
Nos 15-21 (Odd) Including Front Area Railings	II	15-21, High Street			24 August 1990	TQ6238540731; 51°08′34″N 0°19′12″E		1254394	Upload Photo	Q26546068
23 and 23A, High Street	II	High Street			24 August 1990	TQ6235340737; 51°08′34″N 0°19′10″E		1261317	Upload Photo	Q26552277
Oasthouse Approximately 20 Metres South West of Romford House	II	Kings Toll Road			24 August 1990	TQ6400340894; 51°08′38″N 0°20′35″E		1261318	Upload Photo	Q26552278
Romford House	II	Kings Toll Road			24 August 1990	TQ6398540921; 51°08′39″N 0°20′35″E		1254395	Upload Photo	Q26546069
Slowery Farmhouse	II	Kings Toll Road			24 August 1990	TQ6414640785; 51°08′34″N 0°20′43″E		1254396	Upload Photo	Q26546070
Wellgrove Farmhouse	II	Kings Toll Road			24 August 1990	TQ6405040931; 51°08′39″N 0°20′38″E		1254433	Upload Photo	Q26546104
Chippings	II	61, Lower Green Road			24 August 1990	TQ6294241462; 51°08′57″N 0°19′42″E		1254398	Upload Photo	Q26546072
Queens Folly	II	64, Lower Green Road			24 August 1990	TQ6299841486; 51°08′58″N 0°19′45″E		1254437	Upload Photo	Q26546108
51, LOWER GREEN ROAD	II	Lower Green Road			24 August 1990	TQ6282641059; 51°08′44″N 0°19′35″E		1254397	Upload Photo	Q26546071
Knights Place	II	Lower Green Road			5 December 1973	TQ6286741181; 51°08′48″N 0°19′38″E		1254435	Upload Photo	Q26546106
Pembury County Primary School (Old School) Including Front Boundary Wall	II	Lower Green Road			24 August 1990	TQ6285841702; 51°09′05″N 0°19′38″E		1261300	Upload Photo	Q26552261
Hawkwell Cottages	II	1, 2 And 3, Maidstone Road			25 November 1988	TQ6365742895; 51°09′43″N 0°20′21″E		1254441	Upload Photo	Q26546111
Hawkwell Cottages	II	6 And 7, Maidstone Road			24 August 1990	TQ6368442912; 51°09′43″N 0°20′22″E		1254442	Upload Photo	Q26681741
Downingbury Farm Barn	II	Maidstone Road			24 August 1990	TQ6298342289; 51°09′24″N 0°19′45″E		1254439	Upload Photo	Q26546109
Downingbury Farm Oast	II	Maidstone Road			14 April 1986	TQ6301342315; 51°09′25″N 0°19′47″E		1254440	Upload Photo	Q26546110
Downingbury Farmhouse	II*	Maidstone Road			14 April 1986	TQ6297742250; 51°09′23″N 0°19′45″E		1254438	Upload Photo	Q17547586
Garden Walls Adjoining to East and Approximately 2 Metres West of Little Hawkwell Farmhouse	II	Maidstone Road			24 August 1990	TQ6387442980; 51°09′45″N 0°20′32″E		1261301	Upload Photo	Q26552262
Hawkwell Farm Cottages	II	Maidstone Road			24 August 1990	TQ6386143042; 51°09′47″N 0°20′32″E		1254454	Upload Photo	Q26546123
Little Hawkwell Farmhouse	II	Maidstone Road			20 October 1954	TQ6388742985; 51°09′46″N 0°20′33″E		1254443	Upload Photo	Q26546113
Men of Pembury War Memorial	II	Near Junction With Chalket Lane			7 August 2019	TQ6258140712; 51°08′33″N 0°19′22″E		1465121	Men of Pembury War Memorial More images	Q97324480
2 Adjacent Headstones Approximately 1 Metre South of the Nave of the Old Church of St Peter	II	Old Church Road			24 August 1990	TQ6260542972; 51°09′46″N 0°19′27″E		1360939	Upload Photo	Q26642980
Anonymous Chest Tomb Approximately 1.5 Metres South of the Nave of the Old Church of St Peter	II	Old Church Road			24 August 1990	TQ6260242972; 51°09′46″N 0°19′27″E		1261302	Upload Photo	Q26552263
Anonymous Chest Tomb Approximately 1.5 Metres South of the Porch of the Old Church of St Peter	II	Old Church Road			24 August 1990	TQ6259942964; 51°09′46″N 0°19′27″E		1261275	Anonymous Chest Tomb Approximately 1.5 Metres South of the Porch of the Old Church of St Peter More images	Q26552238
Bayly Headstone Approximately 3.5 Metres South of the Chancel of the Old Church of St Peter	II	Old Church Road			24 August 1990	TQ6261642963; 51°09′46″N 0°19′28″E		1240282	Upload Photo	Q26533213
Chapman Headstone Approximately 8 Metres South of the Nave of the Old Church of St Peter	II	Old Church Road			24 August 1990	TQ6260642954; 51°09′46″N 0°19′27″E		1261303	Chapman Headstone Approximately 8 Metres South of the Nave of the Old Church of St Peter More images	Q26552264
Chest Tomb Approximately 1 Metres South of the Chancel of the Old Church of St Peter	II	Old Church Road			24 August 1990	TQ6261142972; 51°09′46″N 0°19′27″E		1239918	Chest Tomb Approximately 1 Metres South of the Chancel of the Old Church of St Peter More images	Q26532864
Dickenson Headstone Approximately 7 Metres South of the Chancel of the Old Church of St Peter	II	Old Church Road			24 August 1990	TQ6261442956; 51°09′46″N 0°19′27″E		1240283	Upload Photo	Q26533214
Dix Headstone Approximately 7 Metres South of the Nave of the Old Church of St Peter	II	Old Church Road			24 August 1990	TQ6260642956; 51°09′46″N 0°19′27″E		1261109	Dix Headstone Approximately 7 Metres South of the Nave of the Old Church of St Peter More images	Q26552084
Fry Headstone Approximately 5 Metres South of the Porch of the Old Church of St Peter	II	Old Church Road			24 August 1990	TQ6259742958; 51°09′46″N 0°19′27″E		1240285	Upload Photo	Q26533216
Gibbon Monument Approximately 16 Metres North East of the Chancel of the Old Church of St Peter	II	Old Church Road			24 August 1990	TQ6263542986; 51°09′47″N 0°19′29″E		1254445	Upload Photo	Q26546114
Hartniep Headstone Approximately 3 Metres South West of the Porch of the Old Church of St Peter	II	Old Church Road			24 August 1990	TQ6259342962; 51°09′46″N 0°19′26″E		1240286	Upload Photo	Q26533217
Illegible Headstone Approximately 1 Metre South of the Chancel of the Old Church of St Peter	II	Old Church Road			24 August 1990	TQ6261842972; 51°09′46″N 0°19′28″E		1240291	Upload Photo	Q26533222
Kinzey Headstone Approximately 4 Metres South of the Chancel of the Old Church of St Peter	II	Old Church Road			24 August 1990	TQ6261742961; 51°09′46″N 0°19′28″E		1240288	Upload Photo	Q26533219
Lychgate to Churchyard of the Old Church of St Peter	II	Old Church Road			24 August 1990	TQ6260742936; 51°09′45″N 0°19′27″E		1239910	Lychgate to Churchyard of the Old Church of St Peter More images	Q26532856
Mancktell Headstone Approximately 2 Metres West of the Tower of the Old Church of St Peter	II	Old Church Road			24 August 1990	TQ6258142982; 51°09′47″N 0°19′26″E		1240289	Upload Photo	Q26533220
Old Church of St Peter	I	Old Church Road			20 October 1954	TQ6260442979; 51°09′47″N 0°19′27″E		1254444	Old Church of St Peter More images	Q17524645
Pair of Hartridge Headstones Approximately 4 Metres West South West of the Tower of the Old Church of St Peter	II	Old Church Road			24 August 1990	TQ6258142973; 51°09′46″N 0°19′26″E		1240287	Pair of Hartridge Headstones Approximately 4 Metres West South West of the Tower of the Old Church of St Peter More images	Q26533218
Peto Monument Approximately 2.5 Metres South of the Chancel of the Old Church of St Peter	II	Old Church Road			24 August 1990	TQ6260842965; 51°09′46″N 0°19′27″E		1254446	Peto Monument Approximately 2.5 Metres South of the Chancel of the Old Church of St Peter More images	Q26546115
Potter Headstone Approximately 3.5 Metres South of the Chancel of the Old Church of St Peter	II	Old Church Road			24 August 1990	TQ6260942963; 51°09′46″N 0°19′27″E		1261110	Upload Photo	Q26552085
Row of 3 Driver Headstones Approximately 6 Metres South of the Tower of the Old Church of St Peter	II	Old Church Road			24 August 1990	TQ6258742967; 51°09′46″N 0°19′26″E		1240284	Row of 3 Driver Headstones Approximately 6 Metres South of the Tower of the Old Church of St Peter More images	Q26533215
Weller Headstone Approximately 3 Metres South West of the Tower of the Old Church of St Peter	II	Old Church Road			24 August 1990	TQ6258242972; 51°09′46″N 0°19′26″E		1240290	Upload Photo	Q26533221
Woodward Headstone Approximately 1.5 Metres North of the Chancel of the Old Church of St Peter	II	Old Church Road			24 August 1990	TQ6261342986; 51°09′47″N 0°19′27″E		1074952	Woodward Headstone Approximately 1.5 Metres North of the Chancel of the Old Church of St Peter More images	Q26337587
Cockshoot Cottages	II	1 And 2, Redwings Lane			24 August 1990	TQ6275142426; 51°09′29″N 0°19′34″E		1261111	Upload Photo	Q26552086
Myrtle Cottage	II	2, Romford Road			24 August 1990	TQ6296841248; 51°08′50″N 0°19′43″E		1074939	Upload Photo	Q26337560
Albans Farmhouse	II	Romford Road			24 August 1990	TQ6440542110; 51°09′17″N 0°20′58″E		1074935	Upload Photo	Q26337550
Hazelwood	II	Romford Road			24 August 1990	TQ6362640998; 51°08′42″N 0°20′16″E		1074941	Upload Photo	Q26337564
Mays Barn	II	Romford Road			24 August 1990	TQ6379640980; 51°08′41″N 0°20′25″E		1360968	Upload Photo	Q26643006
Mays Farmhouse	II	Romford Road			24 August 1990	TQ6380640962; 51°08′40″N 0°20′25″E		1074940	Upload Photo	Q26337561
Romford Farmhouse	II	Romford Road			24 August 1990	TQ6399741246; 51°08′49″N 0°20′36″E		1074934	Upload Photo	Q26337549
Stantons	II	Romford Road			24 August 1990	TQ6355340988; 51°08′41″N 0°20′12″E		1360969	Upload Photo	Q26643007
The Forresters	II	Romford Road			24 August 1990	TQ6395441157; 51°08′46″N 0°20′33″E		1074942	Upload Photo	Q26337566
The Lodge	II	7, The Green			24 August 1990	TQ6252740838; 51°08′37″N 0°19′19″E		1254379	The Lodge More images	Q26546055
No 5, Gates House Including Front Area Railings	II	The Green			24 August 1990	TQ6251340823; 51°08′37″N 0°19′19″E		1261383	No 5, Gates House Including Front Area Railings More images	Q26552339
The Manor House Including Front Garden Walls	II	The Green			24 August 1990	TQ6249340792; 51°08′36″N 0°19′18″E		1254302	The Manor House Including Front Garden Walls More images	Q26545981
Chapel at Pembury Hospital	II	Tonbridge Road			11 May 2007	TQ6135241354; 51°08′55″N 0°18′20″E		1391959	Upload Photo	Q26671288
Fairthorne Cottage	II	Tonbridge Road			19 June 1986	TQ6137243030; 51°09′50″N 0°18′24″E		1074937	Upload Photo	Q26337556
Fairthorne House	II	Tonbridge Road			14 October 1987	TQ6139743081; 51°09′51″N 0°18′25″E		1074936	Upload Photo	Q26337553
Milestone at TQ 612 422	II	Tonbridge Road			24 August 1990	TQ6121842130; 51°09′21″N 0°18′14″E		1067580	Upload Photo	Q26320388
Sandhill Farmhouse	II	Tonbridge Road			24 August 1990	TQ6124841880; 51°09′12″N 0°18′15″E		1074895	Upload Photo	Q26337466
Yew Tree Farmhouse	II	Tonbridge Road			20 October 1986	TQ6129342416; 51°09′30″N 0°18′19″E		1074938	Upload Photo	Q26337557

== See also ==
- Grade I listed buildings in Kent
- Grade II* listed buildings in Kent

== Sources ==
- Newman, John (2012) [1969], Kent: West and the Weald, The Buildings of England, New Haven and London: Yale University Press, ISBN 978-0-300-18509-6
