= Listed buildings in Bidborough =

Civil Parish in Kent, England

Bidborough is a village and civil parish in the Borough of Tunbridge Wells of Kent, England. It contains 33 listed buildings that are recorded in the National Heritage List for England. Of these two are grade II* and 31 are grade II.

This list is based on the information retrieved online from Historic England.

== Key ==
Grade	Criteria
I	Buildings that are of exceptional interest
II*	Particularly important buildings of more than special interest
II	Buildings that are of special interest

== Listing ==
Name	Grade	Location	Type	Completed (Note: The date given is the date used by Historic England as significant for the initial building or that of an important part in the structure's description.)	Date designated	Grid ref. (Note: The grid reference is based on the British national grid reference system, sometimes known as OSGB36, used by the Ordnance Survey.) Geo-coordinates	Notes	Entry number (Note: The "List Entry Number" is a unique number assigned to each listed building and scheduled monument by Historic England.)	Image	Wikidata
Bidborough Ridge Cottage	II	Bidborough Ridge			24 August 1990	TQ5721243741; 51°10′17″N 0°14′51″E		1248824	Upload Photo	Q26541012
The Chalet	II	Franks Hollow Road			24 August 1990	TQ5643243134; 51°09′58″N 0°14′10″E		1248825	Upload Photo	Q26541014
The Grange	II*	Franks Hollow Road			20 October 1954	TQ5641843034; 51°09′55″N 0°14′09″E		1277723	Upload Photo	Q17547648
Broadfield	II	Gate Farm Road			24 August 1990	TQ5640443781; 51°10′19″N 0°14′09″E		1277724	Upload Photo	Q26567119
Chest Tomb 1 1/2 Metres South East of the Porch of the Church of St Lawrence	II	High Street			24 August 1990	TQ5651243192; 51°10′00″N 0°14′14″E		1248830	Upload Photo	Q26541018
Darnley Chest Tomb About 3 Metres North of the Vestry of the Church of St Lawrence	II	High Street			24 August 1990	TQ5652043213; 51°10′00″N 0°14′14″E		1248828	Upload Photo	Q26541016
Deacon House	II	High Street			1 July 1987	TQ5644443357; 51°10′05″N 0°14′11″E		1248833	Upload Photo	Q26541021
Garden Chest Tomb About 13 Metres North of the Vestry of the Church of St Lawrence	II	High Street			24 August 1990	TQ5651843216; 51°10′00″N 0°14′14″E		1277726	Upload Photo	Q26567121
Headstone and Footstone About 11 Metres South East of the Porch of the Church of St Lawrence	II	High Street			24 August 1990	TQ5651443194; 51°10′00″N 0°14′14″E		1248829	Upload Photo	Q26541017
North West Lychgate to the Church of St Lawrence	II	High Street			24 August 1990	TQ5648143284; 51°10′03″N 0°14′12″E		1277725	Upload Photo	Q26567120
Parish Church of St Lawrence	II*	High Street	church building		20 October 1954	TQ5651143205; 51°10′00″N 0°14′14″E		1248826	Parish Church of St Lawrence More images	Q17547518
Prendergast and De Roll Chest Tombs Immediately West of the Porch of the Church of St Lawrence	II	High Street			24 August 1990	TQ5650743194; 51°10′00″N 0°14′14″E		1277727	Upload Photo	Q26567122
School House and the Old School	II	High Street			24 August 1990	TQ5651143140; 51°09′58″N 0°14′14″E		1248832	Upload Photo	Q26541020
South Lychgate to the Church of St Lawrence Including 3 Flights of Stone Steps and the Churchyard Wall to the North East	II	High Street			24 August 1990	TQ5649843162; 51°09′59″N 0°14′13″E		1248827	Upload Photo	Q26541015
Sycamore Cottages	II	1 and 2, High Street			24 August 1990	TQ5648743125; 51°09′57″N 0°14′12″E		1277698	Upload Photo	Q26567095
Bakers Cottage	II	4, High Street			24 August 1990	TQ5648543216; 51°10′00″N 0°14′13″E		1248922	Upload Photo	Q26541101
6, High Street	II	6, High Street			24 August 1990	TQ5648443206; 51°10′00″N 0°14′12″E		1248831	Upload Photo	Q26541019
9, High Street	II	9, High Street			24 August 1990	TQ5649043179; 51°09′59″N 0°14′13″E		1248924	Upload Photo	Q26541103
Boundary Wall to Swaylands School Along the Penshurst Road and Marlpit Corner	II	Marlpit Corner			24 August 1990	TQ5351143110; 51°10′00″N 0°11′39″E		1277666	Upload Photo	Q26567065
Ashour Farm Cottage Including Garden Wall to South	II	Penshurst Road			24 August 1990	TQ5475743485; 51°10′11″N 0°12′44″E		1277667	Upload Photo	Q26567066
Bidborough Court	II	Penshurst Road			24 August 1990	TQ5598743372; 51°10′06″N 0°13′47″E		1277665	Upload Photo	Q26567064
Four Winds Windmill	II	Penshurst Road	tower mill		24 August 1990	TQ5613543444; 51°10′08″N 0°13′55″E		1248949	Four Winds Windmill More images	Q4904034
Lodge to Swaylands School	II	Penshurst Road			24 August 1990	TQ5343543166; 51°10′02″N 0°11′36″E		1248953	Upload Photo	Q26541130
Mill Cottage	II	Penshurst Road			24 August 1990	TQ5615543382; 51°10′06″N 0°13′56″E		1248951	Upload Photo	Q26541128
Stable Block at Swaylands School	II	Penshurst Road			24 August 1990	TQ5337143217; 51°10′04″N 0°11′32″E		1248954	Upload Photo	Q26541131
Terrace Walls and Balustrades South and West of Bidborough Court	II	Penshurst Road			24 August 1990	TQ5599143355; 51°10′05″N 0°13′47″E		1248952	Upload Photo	Q26541129
Wyatts	II	Rectory Drive			24 August 1990	TQ5653643366; 51°10′05″N 0°14′15″E		1248955	Upload Photo	Q26541132
Fosters Farmhouse	II	Upper Hayesden			24 August 1990	TQ5613244755; 51°10′51″N 0°13′57″E		1248956	Upload Photo	Q26541133
Judd Farmhouse	II	Upper Hayesden			24 June 1987	TQ5606744359; 51°10′38″N 0°13′53″E		1249048	Upload Photo	Q26541214
Threshing Barn 30 Metres South West of Fosters Farmhouse	II	Upper Hayesden			24 August 1990	TQ5610844731; 51°10′50″N 0°13′55″E		1248957	Upload Photo	Q26541134
Fosters Cottages	II	1, 2 and 3, Upper Hayesden			24 August 1990	TQ5616344624; 51°10′46″N 0°13′58″E		1277669	Upload Photo	Q26567068

== See also ==
- Grade I listed buildings in Kent
- Grade II* listed buildings in Kent

== Sources ==
- Newman, John (2012) [1969], Kent: West and the Weald, The Buildings of England, New Haven and London: Yale University Press, ISBN 978-0-300-18509-6
