= Listed buildings in Hawkhurst =

Historic structures in Kent, England

Hawkhurst is a village and civil parish in the borough of Tunbridge Wells in Kent, England.. It contains one grade I, six grade II* and 132 grade II listed buildings that are recorded in the National Heritage List for England.

This list is based on the information retrieved online from Historic England.

== Key ==
Grade	Criteria
I	Buildings that are of exceptional interest
II*	Particularly important buildings of more than special interest
II	Buildings that are of special interest

== Listing ==
Name	Grade	Location	Type	Completed (Note: The date given is the date used by Historic England as significant for the initial building or that of an important part in the structure's description.)	Date designated	Grid ref. (Note: The grid reference is based on the British national grid reference system, sometimes known as OSGB36, used by the Ordnance Survey.) Geo-coordinates	Notes	Entry number (Note: The "List Entry Number" is a unique number assigned to each listed building and scheduled monument by Historic England.)	Image	Wikidata
Netters Hall	II	Allwaters Lane			22 June 1989	TQ7755233018; 51°04′09″N 0°31′58″E		1084633	Upload Photo	Q26368396
Reynolds Farmhouse	II	Allwaters Lane			22 June 1989	TQ7676032889; 51°04′05″N 0°31′17″E		1338735	Upload Photo	
Attwaters and Wall Attached	II	Attwaters Lane			22 June 1989	TQ7737733078; 51°04′11″N 0°31′49″E		1084632	Upload Photo	
Attwaters Cottage and Rowan Cottage	II	Attwaters Lane			17 March 1981	TQ7705432988; 51°04′08″N 0°31′33″E		1084631	Upload Photo	
Barn About 20 Metres West of Netters Hall	II	Attwaters Lane			22 June 1989	TQ7753533035; 51°04′09″N 0°31′57″E		1338737	Upload Photo	
Barn/outbuildings About 50 Metres South West of Attwaters	II	Attwaters Lane			22 June 1989	TQ7733333033; 51°04′09″N 0°31′47″E		1338736	Upload Photo	
Little Conghurst	II	Conghurst Lane			22 June 1989	TQ7723629193; 51°02′05″N 0°31′35″E		1338738	Upload Photo	
Charlwood	II	Conghurst Lane			22 June 1989	TQ7769129723; 51°02′22″N 0°31′59″E		1106300	Upload Photo	
Conghurst, With Walls and Outhouses Attached	II	Conghurst Lane			22 June 1989	TQ7699328208; 51°01′34″N 0°31′21″E		1325969	Upload Photo	
Little Conghurst Cottage	II	Conghurst Lane			22 June 1989	TQ7730829314; 51°02′09″N 0°31′39″E		1106275	Upload Photo	
Oasthouse About 100 Metres West of Conghurst	II	Conghurst Lane			22 June 1989	TQ7688628204; 51°01′34″N 0°31′15″E		1107205	Oasthouse About 100 Metres West of Conghurst More images	Q26401015
Stable Court, About 20 Metres West of Conghurst	II	Conghurst Lane			22 June 1989	TQ7695828216; 51°01′34″N 0°31′19″E		1084635	Upload Photo	
Osborne's Farmhouse	II	Cranbrook Road			22 June 1989	TQ7585833339; 51°04′21″N 0°30′32″E		1107218	Upload Photo	
Rose's Farmhouse	II	Cranbrook Road			20 June 1967	TQ7580732938; 51°04′08″N 0°30′28″E		1084636	Upload Photo	
Delmonden Grange	II	Delmonden Green			22 June 1989	TQ7354030346; 51°02′47″N 0°28′28″E		1325517	Upload Photo	
Delmonden Manor House	II	Delmonden Green			22 June 1989	TQ7352130184; 51°02′41″N 0°28′26″E		1084637	Upload Photo	
Ashfield Cottages	II	Delmonden Lane			22 June 1989	TQ7422629474; 51°02′18″N 0°29′01″E		1325546	Upload Photo	
Delmonden Farm House	II	Delmonden Lane			20 June 1967	TQ7391229663; 51°02′24″N 0°28′45″E		1338739	Upload Photo	
Keepers Cottage	II	Delmonden Road			22 June 1989	TQ7383830240; 51°02′43″N 0°28′43″E		1084638	Upload Photo	
Horns Cottage	II	Demolden Road			22 June 1989	TQ7433829557; 51°02′20″N 0°29′07″E		1325548	Upload Photo	
Beacon Lodge	II	Foxhole Lane			22 June 1989	TQ7773729789; 51°02′24″N 0°32′02″E		1084599	Upload Photo	
4, Gingerbread Lane	II	Gingerbread Lane			22 June 1989	TQ7281630976; 51°03′08″N 0°27′52″E		1107938	Upload Photo	Q26401729
Bedgebury Lower School	II*	Hastings Road			20 June 1967	TQ7572729313; 51°02′11″N 0°30′18″E		1084640	Upload Photo	
Bedgebury Lower School Lillesden With Terraces, Collingwood House and Wall Attached	II	1, Hastings Road			22 June 1989	TQ7565229036; 51°02′02″N 0°30′14″E		1338742	Upload Photo	
Elford Lodge	II	Hastings Road			22 June 1989	TQ7569029466; 51°02′16″N 0°30′16″E		1338741	Upload Photo	
Elfords	II	Hastings Road			22 June 1989	TQ7574629430; 51°02′14″N 0°30′19″E		1107917	Upload Photo	
Gate Lodge to Lillesden	II	Hastings Road			22 June 1989	TQ7566929221; 51°02′08″N 0°30′15″E		1325218	Upload Photo	
Herschels Dairy	II	Hastings Road			20 June 1967	TQ7570429096; 51°02′04″N 0°30′16″E		1107890	Upload Photo	
St Margarets Cross and wall to garden	II	Hastings Road			22 June 1989	TQ7565529442; 51°02′15″N 0°30′15″E		1084643	Upload Photo	
Stable Courtyard About 25 Metres North West of Gate Lodge, Lillesden	II	Hastings Road			22 June 1989	TQ7563429257; 51°02′09″N 0°30′13″E		1084642	Upload Photo	
Stables, Walled Gardens and Outhouses Adjoining Collingwood House to the South and West	II	Hastings Road			22 June 1989	TQ7568729320; 51°02′11″N 0°30′16″E		1084641	Upload Photo	
The Old Vicarage	II	Hastings Road			20 June 1967	TQ7557429379; 51°02′13″N 0°30′10″E		1325221	Upload Photo	
The Ram House	II	Hastings Road			17 February 2005	TQ7583428401; 51°01′41″N 0°30′22″E		1391307	Upload Photo	
Water Tower Adjoining Tower Cottage	II	Hastings Road			17 July 1990	TQ7565829358; 51°02′12″N 0°30′15″E		1261916	Upload Photo	
Barretts Green Farmhouse	II	Heartenoak Road			22 June 1989	TQ7614230783; 51°02′58″N 0°30′42″E		1084645	Upload Photo	
Beals Green Farmhouse	II	Heartenoak Road			22 June 1989	TQ7604631674; 51°03′27″N 0°30′38″E		1119644	Upload Photo	
The Lodge, Fir Trees	II	Heartenoak Road			22 June 1989	TQ7611630658; 51°02′54″N 0°30′40″E		1084644	Upload Photo	
Hensill and Courtyard Buildings and Walls Attached to Rear	II	Hensill Lane			22 June 1989	TQ7546830149; 51°02′38″N 0°30′06″E		1084646	Upload Photo	
Lodge Cottage	II	Hensill Lane			22 June 1989	TQ7535829729; 51°02′25″N 0°30′00″E		1084647	Upload Photo	
Iddenden Cottages	II	High Street			20 June 1967	TQ7494030665; 51°02′55″N 0°29′40″E		1084614	Upload Photo	
Iddenden Cottages	II	High Street			22 June 1989	TQ7491730673; 51°02′56″N 0°29′39″E		1120923	Upload Photo	
Barn and Outbuilding About 20 Metres North of Lea Farm	II	High Street			22 June 1989	TQ7340830997; 51°03′08″N 0°28′22″E		1338728	Upload Photo	
Barnfield Cottage and Barn Attached	II	High Street			22 June 1989	TQ7501430647; 51°02′55″N 0°29′44″E		1120887	Upload Photo	
Barnfield Farmhouse	II	High Street			22 June 1989	TQ7504130646; 51°02′55″N 0°29′45″E		1084617	Upload Photo	
Chittenden Cottage	II	High Street			22 June 1989	TQ7524930725; 51°02′57″N 0°29′56″E		1120919	Upload Photo	
Crane House and Rear Garden Wall	II	High Street			20 June 1967	TQ7586830668; 51°02′54″N 0°30′28″E		1084612	Upload Photo	
Garden Court and Attached Walls	II	High Street			22 June 1989	TQ7568530785; 51°02′58″N 0°30′18″E		1119592	Upload Photo	
Geering and Colyer Estate Agents Stone Rock	II	High Street			20 June 1967	TQ7596830552; 51°02′51″N 0°30′32″E		1084619	Upload Photo	
Great Pix Hall	II	High Street			22 June 1989	TQ7482130685; 51°02′56″N 0°29′34″E		1338727	Upload Photo	
Highgate House	II	High Street			22 June 1989	TQ7602730592; 51°02′52″N 0°30′36″E		1084611	Upload Photo	
Iddenden	II	High Street			22 June 1989	TQ7487430630; 51°02′54″N 0°29′37″E		1323107	Upload Photo	
Lea Farm	II	High Street			22 June 1989	TQ7341530976; 51°03′07″N 0°28′22″E		1084615	Upload Photo	
Little Pix Hall and Attached Wall	II	High Street			9 June 1952	TQ7351530833; 51°03′02″N 0°28′27″E		1120929	Upload Photo	
Marlborough House School	II*	High Street			9 June 1952	TQ7529030675; 51°02′55″N 0°29′58″E		1338729	Upload Photo	
Milestone at 753 307	II	High Street			22 June 1989	TQ7533130724; 51°02′57″N 0°30′00″E		1084613	Upload Photo	
Nos 1 to 3 Northgrove Terrace, With Railed Basement Areas	II	High Street			22 June 1989	TQ7593430613; 51°02′53″N 0°30′31″E		1338725	Upload Photo	
Oakfield House and Wellington House	II	High Street			20 June 1967	TQ7571930767; 51°02′58″N 0°30′20″E		1338726	Upload Photo	
Pithall Cottage	II	High Street			22 June 1989	TQ7343031029; 51°03′09″N 0°28′23″E		1120912	Upload Photo	
Seacox Cottages	II	High Street			22 June 1989	TQ7303230844; 51°03′03″N 0°28′02″E		1084616	Upload Photo	
Stable Block Adjoining Marlborough House School to the West	II	High Street			20 June 1967	TQ7526830679; 51°02′55″N 0°29′57″E		1120857	Upload Photo	
The Clearing	II	High Street			22 June 1989	TQ7584530582; 51°02′52″N 0°30′26″E		1338730	Upload Photo	
The Little Manor, Wall and Water Pump Attached	II	High Street			22 June 1989	TQ7571230631; 51°02′53″N 0°30′20″E		1120866	Upload Photo	
Walls and Gatepiers to North of Marlborough House School	II	High Street			22 June 1989	TQ7526530702; 51°02′56″N 0°29′57″E		1084618	Upload Photo	
War Memorial	II	Highgate			12 September 2002	TQ7603730554; 51°02′50″N 0°30′36″E		1031908	War Memorial More images	Q26283303
Cockshot Cottage	II	Highgate Hill			11 August 1988	TQ7592430103; 51°02′36″N 0°30′29″E		1084610	Upload Photo	
Cockshott Farmhouse	II	Highgate Hill			22 June 1989	TQ7597130146; 51°02′37″N 0°30′32″E		1084608	Upload Photo	
Lorenden	II	Highgate Hill			11 August 1988	TQ7596730487; 51°02′48″N 0°30′32″E		1084609	Upload Photo	
Rose Cottage	II	Highgate Hill			22 June 1989	TQ7596930156; 51°02′38″N 0°30′32″E		1338760	Upload Photo	
2 to 4, Hunters Cottages	II	Hunters Cottages			22 June 1989	TQ7768229712; 51°02′21″N 0°31′59″E		1084634	Upload Photo	
7 and 8	II	Moor Hill			22 June 1989	TQ7582229911; 51°02′30″N 0°30′24″E		1084590	Upload Photo	
Dragons	II	Moor Hill			22 June 1989	TQ7577729780; 51°02′26″N 0°30′21″E		1084589	Upload Photo	
Wych House	II	Moor Hill			22 June 1989	TQ7573029779; 51°02′26″N 0°30′19″E		1338752	Upload Photo	
Northgrove Cottages	II	Northgrove Road			22 June 1989	TQ7594230633; 51°02′53″N 0°30′31″E		1338753	Upload Photo	
The Ingles	II	Northgrove Road			22 June 1989	TQ7605430621; 51°02′53″N 0°30′37″E		1084591	Upload Photo	
Housefield Cottage Little Ockley	II	Ockley Lane			22 June 1989	TQ7612330913; 51°03′02″N 0°30′41″E		1338558	Upload Photo	
Ockley	II	Ockley Lane			22 June 1989	TQ7621531304; 51°03′15″N 0°30′46″E		1084592	Upload Photo	
Ockley Farmhouse	II	Ockley Lane			22 June 1989	TQ7605231388; 51°03′17″N 0°30′38″E		1084593	Upload Photo	
The Old Bazaar and Weald House	II	Ockley Lane			22 June 1989	TQ7609230662; 51°02′54″N 0°30′39″E		1119649	Upload Photo	
Tanyard Farmhouse	II	Park Lane			22 June 1989	TQ7424232402; 51°03′52″N 0°29′07″E		1084594	Upload Photo	
Whitelime Cottages Whitelimes Farm	II	Park Lane			22 June 1989	TQ7484833789; 51°04′36″N 0°29′41″E		1121885	Upload Photo	
Whitelimes Barn	II	Park Lane			30 October 1987	TQ7483133737; 51°04′35″N 0°29′40″E		1338754	Upload Photo	
Kemp's	II	Potter's Lane			20 June 1967	TQ7616932848; 51°04′05″N 0°30′47″E		1121898	Upload Photo	
Potter's Farmhouse	II	Potter's Lane			22 June 1989	TQ7633232798; 51°04′03″N 0°30′55″E		1338755	Upload Photo	
The Coach Houses	II	Rye Road			20 June 1967	TQ7667630448; 51°02′46″N 0°31′09″E		1337642	Upload Photo	
Dunk's School and Almshouses	II	Rye Road			9 June 1952	TQ7620130578; 51°02′51″N 0°30′44″E		1084595	Upload Photo	
The Colonnade	II	Rye Road			20 June 1967	TQ7607930574; 51°02′51″N 0°30′38″E		1121863	Upload Photo	
Church of All Saints	II	Rye Road			22 June 1989	TQ7620830509; 51°02′49″N 0°30′45″E		1124178	Church of All Saints More images	Q26417256
Clayhill	II	Rye Road			22 June 1989	TQ7807529747; 51°02′22″N 0°32′19″E		1123700	Upload Photo	
Fothersby Fothersby West	II	Rye Road			22 June 1989	TQ7719130313; 51°02′41″N 0°31′35″E		1084601	Upload Photo	
Fowlers Park House	II	Rye Road			20 June 1967	TQ7666330400; 51°02′45″N 0°31′08″E		1084596	Upload Photo	
Galimorph Queens Mews	II	Rye Road			22 June 1989	TQ7623430562; 51°02′51″N 0°30′46″E		1338756	Upload Photo	
Hawkhurst Place	II	0, Rye Road			9 June 1952	TQ7680130313; 51°02′42″N 0°31′15″E		1084602	Upload Photo	
Milestone at 765 304	II	Rye Road			22 June 1989	TQ7684830342; 51°02′43″N 0°31′17″E		1338757	Upload Photo	
Miss Margarets Zan Restaurant	II	Rye Road			22 June 1989	TQ7601430529; 51°02′50″N 0°30′35″E		1084605	Upload Photo	
National Westminster Bank	II	Rye Road			20 June 1967	TQ7622230579; 51°02′51″N 0°30′46″E		1123739	Upload Photo	
North Ridge	II	Rye Road			20 June 1967	TQ7608830528; 51°02′50″N 0°30′39″E		1084604	Upload Photo	
Oak and Ivy Public House	II	Rye Road			22 June 1989	TQ7734430308; 51°02′41″N 0°31′43″E		1084598	Oak and Ivy Public House More images	
Old Forge Cottage	II	Rye Road			22 June 1989	TQ7760529905; 51°02′28″N 0°31′55″E		1123725	Upload Photo	
Quadrant Walls and Gate Piers to Tongswood Drive	II	Rye Road			22 June 1989	TQ7746030185; 51°02′37″N 0°31′48″E		1338758	Upload Photo	
Riseden Clockhouse	II	Rye Road			20 June 1967	TQ7777029737; 51°02′22″N 0°32′04″E		1338759	Upload Photo	
Royal Oak Inn	II	Rye Road			20 June 1967	TQ7603330527; 51°02′50″N 0°30′36″E		1110842	Royal Oak Inn More images	
Solomons	II	Rye Road			22 June 1989	TQ7784929781; 51°02′23″N 0°32′08″E		1123731	Upload Photo	
Southgate and Eastgate	II	Rye Road			22 June 1989	TQ7687130360; 51°02′43″N 0°31′18″E		1123716	Upload Photo	
The Lodge, Fowlers Park	II	Rye Road			22 June 1989	TQ7670930366; 51°02′44″N 0°31′10″E		1084597	Upload Photo	
The Lodge, Tongswood	II	Rye Road			22 June 1989	TQ7748230171; 51°02′37″N 0°31′50″E		1123720	Upload Photo	
The Queen's Hotel	II	Rye Road			9 June 1952	TQ7627130579; 51°02′51″N 0°30′48″E		1123743	The Queen's Hotel More images	
The Victorian Hall and Railed Forecourt	II	Rye Road			22 June 1989	TQ7611230541; 51°02′50″N 0°30′40″E		1124182	Upload Photo	
Well and Housing in Churchyard Wall About 25 Metres North East of Church of All Saints	II	Rye Road			22 June 1989	TQ7622930516; 51°02′49″N 0°30′46″E		1084603	Upload Photo	
Well Cottage	II	Rye Road			22 June 1989	TQ7797629769; 51°02′23″N 0°32′14″E		1084600	Upload Photo	
Wentworth Cottage and Mistletoe Cottage	II	Rye Road			22 June 1989	TQ7740630201; 51°02′38″N 0°31′46″E		1337698	Upload Photo	
Chittenden	II	Slip Mill Lane			22 June 1989	TQ7532030757; 51°02′58″N 0°30′00″E		1084606	Upload Photo	
Chittenden Lodge	II	Slip Mill Lane			22 June 1989	TQ7532230776; 51°02′58″N 0°30′00″E		1084565	Upload Photo	
Barn About 25 Metres South West of Holmans	II	Slip Mill Road			22 June 1989	TQ7551431497; 51°03′22″N 0°30′11″E		1338777	Upload Photo	
Coach House and Yard With Outbuilding About 20 Metres West of Slip Mill House	II	Slip Mill Road			22 June 1989	TQ7550931345; 51°03′17″N 0°30′10″E		1338778	Upload Photo	
Holmans	II	Slip Mill Road			9 June 1952	TQ7552231527; 51°03′23″N 0°30′11″E		1084566	Upload Photo	
Primrose Hill	II	Slip Mill Road			20 June 1967	TQ7547631460; 51°03′20″N 0°30′09″E		1084569	Upload Photo	
Slip Mill Cottage	II	Slip Mill Road			22 June 1989	TQ7541531141; 51°03′10″N 0°30′05″E		1084568	Upload Photo	
Slip Mill House	II	Slip Mill Road			20 June 1967	TQ7553831350; 51°03′17″N 0°30′12″E		1084567	Upload Photo	
Tickners Tickners East	II	Slip Mill Road			22 June 1989	TQ7538730834; 51°03′00″N 0°30′03″E		1110845	Upload Photo	
Sisley Farmhouse	II	Soper's Lane			22 June 1989	TQ7427831916; 51°03′36″N 0°29′08″E		1338779	Upload Photo	
Soper's Lane Farmhouse	II	Soper's Lane			22 June 1989	TQ7485031646; 51°03′27″N 0°29′37″E		1084570	Upload Photo	
Cranford Farmhouse	II	Stream Lane			21 November 1986	TQ7606329411; 51°02′14″N 0°30′35″E		1338780	Upload Photo	
East Heath	II	Stream Lane			20 June 1967	TQ7624929040; 51°02′01″N 0°30′44″E		1111777	Upload Photo	
Oasthouse About 25 Metres South East of East Heath	II	Stream Lane			22 June 1989	TQ7629629034; 51°02′01″N 0°30′47″E		1084571	Oasthouse About 25 Metres South East of East Heath More images	
Stream Hill Cottage	II	Stream Lane			22 June 1989	TQ7693728955; 51°01′58″N 0°31′19″E		1337006	Upload Photo	
Howes Cottages	II	Talbot Road			22 June 1989	TQ7555729634; 51°02′21″N 0°30′10″E		1111781	Upload Photo	
Jasmine Cottages	II	Talbot Road			22 June 1989	TQ7555029619; 51°02′21″N 0°30′09″E		1084572	Upload Photo	
Floral Cottage	II	Talbot Road			22 June 1989	TQ7551429632; 51°02′21″N 0°30′08″E		1338744	Upload Photo	
Moor House	II	Talbot Road			20 June 1967	TQ7549829595; 51°02′20″N 0°30′07″E		1084574	Upload Photo	
Moor Lodge	II	Talbot Road			22 June 1989	TQ7557429714; 51°02′24″N 0°30′11″E		1338743	Upload Photo	
Stable Block About 20 Metres North West of Moor Lodge	II	Talbot Road			22 June 1989	TQ7556529730; 51°02′24″N 0°30′10″E		1111742	Upload Photo	
The Chestnuts	II	Talbot Road			22 June 1989	TQ7552429635; 51°02′21″N 0°30′08″E		1111744	Upload Photo	
The Rockery	II	Talbot Road			22 June 1989	TQ7555429712; 51°02′24″N 0°30′10″E		1084573	Upload Photo	
Fir Cottages	II	The Moor			22 June 1989	TQ7551229524; 51°02′18″N 0°30′07″E		1084587	Upload Photo	
Church Court the Chantry the Close	II	The Moor			9 June 1952	TQ7554229478; 51°02′16″N 0°30′09″E		1338749	Upload Photo	
Church of St Laurence	I	The Moor			20 June 1967	TQ7559629449; 51°02′15″N 0°30′11″E		1120819	Church of St Laurence More images	Q17530361
Chest Tomb to George West, About 15 Metres West of Church of St Laurence	II	The Moor			22 June 1989	TQ7555329442; 51°02′15″N 0°30′09″E		1120805	Upload Photo	
Chest Tomb to John Colletson, About 30 Metres North of Church of St Lawrence	II	The Moor			22 June 1989	TQ7558729484; 51°02′16″N 0°30′11″E		1253109	Upload Photo	
Chest Tomb to William Durrant, About 15 Metres East of Church of St Lawrence	II	The Moor			22 June 1989	TQ7563029443; 51°02′15″N 0°30′13″E		1084624	Upload Photo	
Gunther Tomb, About 50 Metres West of Church of St Lawrence	II	The Moor			22 June 1989	TQ7552729446; 51°02′15″N 0°30′08″E		1338732	Upload Photo	
Hawkhurst Primary School	II	The Moor			22 June 1989	TQ7568329721; 51°02′24″N 0°30′16″E		1084620	Upload Photo	
Hazel Cottage the Old Bakehouse the Old Bakehouse and Hazel Cottage and Rear Yard	II	The Moor			20 June 1967	TQ7560729514; 51°02′17″N 0°30′12″E		1338731	Upload Photo	
Market Cross	II	The Moor			20 June 1967	TQ7564629445; 51°02′15″N 0°30′14″E		1107844	Upload Photo	
Oak Cottage	II	The Moor			22 June 1989	TQ7554029525; 51°02′18″N 0°30′09″E		1084586	Upload Photo	
Pair of Chest Tombs 1 to 2 Metres South of West Tower of Church of St Lawrence	II	The Moor			22 June 1989	TQ7557729440; 51°02′15″N 0°30′10″E		1323165	Upload Photo	
Pair of Headstones About 10 to 12 Metres West of Church of St Laurence	II	The Moor			22 June 1989	TQ7556429454; 51°02′15″N 0°30′10″E		1084621	Upload Photo	
Pair of Mid C19 Monuments About 25 Metres South West of Church of St Lawrence	II	The Moor			22 June 1989	TQ7555129427; 51°02′15″N 0°30′09″E		1120814	Upload Photo	
Row of 5 Headstones to Chittenden Family, 2 to 10 Metres North of Church of St Lawrence	II	The Moor			22 June 1989	TQ7558829466; 51°02′16″N 0°30′11″E		1253104	Upload Photo	
The Eight Bells Hotel	II	The Moor			22 June 1989	TQ7562929541; 51°02′18″N 0°30′13″E		1120843	Upload Photo	
The Moor Brewery, House and Courtyards With Outbuildings	II	The Moor			22 June 1989	TQ7558129662; 51°02′22″N 0°30′11″E		1338751	Upload Photo	
The Moor Post Office and House Attached	II	The Moor			22 June 1989	TQ7564229733; 51°02′24″N 0°30′14″E		1120876	Upload Photo	
Three Chest Tombs About 10-15 Metres North of Church of St Lawrence	II	The Moor			22 June 1989	TQ7558629470; 51°02′16″N 0°30′11″E		1253108	Upload Photo	
Three Chest Tombs About 2 Metres East of Church of St Lawrence	II	The Moor			22 June 1989	TQ7562029447; 51°02′15″N 0°30′13″E		1253092	Upload Photo	
Three Chest Tombs, 2 to 5 Metres North of Church of St Lawrence	II	The Moor			22 June 1989	TQ7558629463; 51°02′16″N 0°30′11″E		1084627	Upload Photo	
Two Chest Tombs 1 Metre North East of Church of St Lawrence	II	The Moor			22 June 1989	TQ7561329463; 51°02′16″N 0°30′12″E		1084625	Upload Photo	
Two Chest Tombs About 1 Metre South of South Aisle of Church of St Lawrence	II	The Moor			22 June 1989	TQ7560229439; 51°02′15″N 0°30′12″E		1084623	Upload Photo	
Two Headstones 10 and 12 Metres East of Church of St Lawrence	II	The Moor			22 June 1989	TQ7563129451; 51°02′15″N 0°30′13″E		1253095	Upload Photo	
Two Headstones to Exeter Family, About 20 Metres North West of Church of St Lawrence	II	The Moor			22 June 1989	TQ7563429469; 51°02′16″N 0°30′13″E		1084626	Upload Photo	
Two Railed Chest Tombs About 15 Metres South West of Church of St Lawrence	II	The Moor			22 June 1989	TQ7556329427; 51°02′15″N 0°30′10″E		1084622	Upload Photo	
Vine Cottage	II	The Moor			22 June 1989	TQ7559529593; 51°02′20″N 0°30′12″E		1084588	Upload Photo	
Wetheringhope and Wall Attached	II*	The Moor			20 June 1967	TQ7558229564; 51°02′19″N 0°30′11″E		1338750	Upload Photo	
Baretilt	II	Water Lane			22 June 1989	TQ7651933305; 51°04′19″N 0°31′06″E		1084580	Upload Photo	
Barn About 25 Metres North East of Paul's	II	Water Lane			22 June 1989	TQ7663631765; 51°03′29″N 0°31′09″E		1084582	Upload Photo	
Barn and Outhouse About 30 Metres West of Woodsden	II	Water Lane			22 June 1989	TQ7793131853; 51°03′30″N 0°32′16″E		1111910	Upload Photo	
Barns/stock Houses About 30 Metres East of Main Stable Block, Tongswood Farm	II	Water Lane			22 June 1989	TQ7767731020; 51°03′04″N 0°32′01″E		1111907	Upload Photo	
Barns/stock Houses About 30 Metres North East of Main Stable Block, Tongswood Farm	II	Water Lane			22 June 1989	TQ7767631042; 51°03′04″N 0°32′01″E		1338746	Upload Photo	
Birchbarns	II	Water Lane			22 June 1989	TQ7722930477; 51°02′47″N 0°31′37″E		1084584	Upload Photo	
Bridge at TQ 775 313	II	Water Lane			22 June 1989	TQ7752731322; 51°03′14″N 0°31′54″E		1084577	Upload Photo	
Bridge at TQ 775 314	II	Water Lane			22 June 1989	TQ7751431356; 51°03′15″N 0°31′53″E		1084578	Upload Photo	
Coach House Block and the Flat, About 20 Metres North West of Tongswood	II	Water Lane			22 June 1989	TQ7777430828; 51°02′57″N 0°32′06″E		1084575	Upload Photo	
Ellenden Farmhouse	II	Water Lane			20 June 1967	TQ7676332280; 51°03′46″N 0°31′16″E		1338748	Upload Photo	
Four Wents and Four Wents Cottage	II	Water Lane			22 June 1989	TQ7659632773; 51°04′02″N 0°31′09″E		1084581	Upload Photo	
Furnace Mill Farmhouse	II	Water Lane			22 June 1989	TQ7743131364; 51°03′15″N 0°31′49″E		1084583	Upload Photo	
Gun Green Farmhouse	II	Water Lane			20 June 1967	TQ7750030802; 51°02′57″N 0°31′52″E		1111896	Upload Photo	
Main Stable Block About 100 Metres North West of Tongswood Farmhouse	II	Water Lane			22 June 1989	TQ7763031040; 51°03′04″N 0°31′59″E		1337034	Upload Photo	
Oasthouse About 15 Metres East of Tubslake	II	Water Lane			22 June 1989	TQ7594633532; 51°04′27″N 0°30′37″E		1111889	Upload Photo	
Octagonal Tank at Tongswood Farm	II	Water Lane			11 October 1996	TQ7760631093; 51°03′06″N 0°31′57″E		1268433	Upload Photo	
Open Sided Barn at Tongswood Farm	II	Water Lane			11 October 1996	TQ7769031037; 51°03′04″N 0°32′02″E		1268435	Upload Photo	
Paul's	II	Water Lane			22 June 1989	TQ7660331747; 51°03′28″N 0°31′07″E		1336943	Upload Photo	
Rectangular Tank at Tongswood Farm	II	Water Lane			11 October 1996	TQ7776531081; 51°03′06″N 0°32′06″E		1268434	Upload Photo	
Stable Block About 20 Metres East of Main Stable Block, Tongswood Farm	II	Water Lane			22 June 1989	TQ7765031049; 51°03′05″N 0°32′00″E		1084576	Upload Photo	
Stable Block About 30 Metres West of Woodsden	II	Water Lane			22 June 1989	TQ7794131847; 51°03′30″N 0°32′16″E		1084579	Upload Photo	
Stable Range and Cottages to South of Main Stable Block, Tongswood Farm	II	Water Lane			22 June 1989	TQ7763531018; 51°03′04″N 0°31′59″E		1111758	Upload Photo	
Stock House to North of Stables at Tongswood Farm	II	Water Lane			11 October 1996	TQ7765731057; 51°03′05″N 0°32′00″E		1268437	Upload Photo	
Tilden	II	Water Lane			22 June 1989	TQ7761332106; 51°03′39″N 0°32′00″E		1111915	Upload Photo	
Tollgate	II	Water Lane			11 August 1988	TQ7594430093; 51°02′36″N 0°30′30″E		1084607	Upload Photo	
Tongswood Farmhouse With Walled Fore Yard	II	Water Lane			22 June 1989	TQ7765330971; 51°03′02″N 0°32′00″E		1338745	Upload Photo	
Tongswood, Now St Roman's School, With Garden Terrace	II	Water Lane			22 June 1989	TQ7780130807; 51°02′57″N 0°32′07″E		1111749	Upload Photo	
Tubslake	II	Water Lane			22 June 1989	TQ7592133554; 51°04′28″N 0°30′35″E		1336953	Upload Photo	
Walled Garden With Glasshouses About 100 Metres South West of Tongswood	II	Water Lane			22 June 1989	TQ7766430635; 51°02′51″N 0°32′00″E		1111755	Upload Photo	
Woodsden	II	Water Lane			22 June 1989	TQ7796131833; 51°03′30″N 0°32′17″E		1338747	Upload Photo	
Barn About 30 Metres North East of Duval's Farmhouse	II	White's Lane			22 June 1989	TQ7713630852; 51°02′59″N 0°31′33″E		1084545	Upload Photo	
Duval's Farmhouse	II	White's Lane			20 June 1967	TQ7716330840; 51°02′59″N 0°31′34″E		1084585	Upload Photo	
White's Cottage	II	White's Lane			22 June 1989	TQ7679330966; 51°03′03″N 0°31′16″E		1111901	Upload Photo	
Barn About 30 Metres North West of Gill's Green Farmhouse	II				22 June 1989	TQ7557031931; 51°03′36″N 0°30′14″E		1107929	Upload Photo	
Charlton Farmhouse	II				22 June 1989	TQ7768931546; 51°03′21″N 0°32′03″E		1111909	Upload Photo	
Gill's Green Farmhouse	II				22 June 1989	TQ7561331904; 51°03′35″N 0°30′17″E		1107924	Upload Photo	
Oasthouse About 15 Metres North of Gill's Green Farmhouse	II				22 June 1989	TQ7560731927; 51°03′35″N 0°30′16″E		1338740	Oasthouse About 15 Metres North of Gill's Green Farmhouse More images	
The Manor House and Wall Attached	II				20 June 1967	TQ7572932464; 51°03′53″N 0°30′24″E		1084639	Upload Photo	

== See also ==
- Grade I listed buildings in Kent
- Grade II* listed buildings in Kent

== Sources ==
- Newman, John (2012) [1969], Kent: West and the Weald, The Buildings of England, New Haven and London: Yale University Press, ISBN 978-0-300-18509-6
