= Listed buildings in Brenchley and Matfield =

Civil Parish in Kent, England

Brenchley and Matfield is a civil parish containing the villages Brenchley and Matfield in the Borough of Tunbridge Wells of Kent, England. It contains 165 listed buildings that are recorded in the National Heritage List for England. Of these three are grade I, 13 are grade II* and 149 are grade II.

This list is based on the information retrieved online from Historic England.

== Key ==
Grade	Criteria
I	Buildings that are of exceptional interest
II*	Particularly important buildings of more than special interest
II	Buildings that are of special interest

== Listing ==
Name	Grade	Location	Type	Completed (Note: The date given is the date used by Historic England as significant for the initial building or that of an important part in the structure's description.)	Date designated	Grid ref. (Note: The grid reference is based on the British national grid reference system, sometimes known as OSGB36, used by the Ordnance Survey.) Geo-coordinates	Notes	Entry number (Note: The "List Entry Number" is a unique number assigned to each listed building and scheduled monument by Historic England.)	Image	Wikidata
Cowden	II				24 August 1990	TQ6845040939; 51°08′35″N 0°24′24″E		1248958	Upload Photo	Q26541135
The Blue Boys Inn	II	Blue Boys Inn, Hastings Road, Matfield, Tonbridge, TN12 7HE	pub		15 May 2014	TQ6467539920; 51°08′06″N 0°21′08″E		1419679	The Blue Boys Inn More images	Q26676750
Foxella	II	Bramble Reed Lane			24 August 1990	TQ6499541490; 51°08′56″N 0°21′27″E		1248960	Upload Photo	Q26541137
Archway About 15 Metres East of Brenchley Manor	II*	Brenchley Road, Brenchley			24 August 1990	TQ6762342094; 51°09′13″N 0°23′44″E		1249084	Upload Photo	Q17547523
Beals Cottages	II	Brenchley Road, Market Heath			24 August 1990	TQ6719641813; 51°09′04″N 0°23′21″E		1249115	Upload Photo	Q26541278
Brenchley Manor	II*	Brenchley Road, Brenchley			20 October 1954	TQ6759542105; 51°09′13″N 0°23′42″E		1277671	Upload Photo	Q17547643
Brenchley Manor Oast	II	Brenchley Road, Brenchley			24 August 1990	TQ6756542152; 51°09′15″N 0°23′41″E		1249088	Upload Photo	Q26541251
Chapel Cottage	II	Brenchley Road, Walnut Tree			24 August 1990	TQ6666041790; 51°09′04″N 0°22′54″E		1277595	Upload Photo	Q26566999
Chapel Immediately North of Chapel Cottage	II	Brenchley Road, Walnut Tree	chapel		24 August 1990	TQ6665341796; 51°09′04″N 0°22′53″E		1249094	Chapel Immediately North of Chapel Cottage More images	Q26541257
Garden Walls to the Garden East and South of Brenchley Manor	II	Brenchley Road, Brenchley			24 August 1990	TQ6759142068; 51°09′12″N 0°23′42″E		1248961	Upload Photo	Q26541138
Holmbush	II	Brenchley Road, Homebush			24 August 1990	TQ6643941950; 51°09′09″N 0°22′42″E		1277613	Upload Photo	Q26567015
Homebush Cottage	II	Brenchley Road, Homebush			24 August 1990	TQ6640541975; 51°09′10″N 0°22′41″E		1249089	Upload Photo	Q26541252
Market Heath Cottage	II	Brenchley Road, Market Heath			24 August 1990	TQ6711841789; 51°09′03″N 0°23′17″E		1249091	Upload Photo	Q26541254
Studmore	II*	Brenchley Road			20 October 1954	TQ6681641824; 51°09′05″N 0°23′02″E		1277603	Upload Photo	Q17547639
Swingle Swangle Cottages	II	Brenchley Road, Walnut Tree			24 August 1990	TQ6661441806; 51°09′05″N 0°22′51″E		1249093	Upload Photo	Q26541256
The Crescent	II	Brenchley Road, Market Heath			24 August 1990	TQ6732741863; 51°09′06″N 0°23′28″E		1249092	Upload Photo	Q26541255
Town Farm Dairy	II	Brenchley Road, Market Heath			24 August 1990	TQ6725941803; 51°09′04″N 0°23′24″E		1249118	Upload Photo	Q26541281
Whitethorn Cottage	II	Brenchley Road, Homebush			24 August 1990	TQ6630141997; 51°09′11″N 0°22′35″E		1249090	Upload Photo	Q26541253
Whitethorn Cottages	II	5 and 6, Brenchley Road, Homebush			24 August 1990	TQ6631841996; 51°09′11″N 0°22′36″E		1277614	Upload Photo	Q26567016
Town Farm Oast	II	Church Close, Brenchley			24 August 1990	TQ6798941758; 51°09′02″N 0°24′02″E		1249095	Upload Photo	Q26541258
Crittenden House	II	Crittenden Road			11 May 1988	TQ6572943485; 51°10′00″N 0°22′08″E		1254230	Upload Photo	Q26545913
Gazebo About 30 Metres North East of Gedges Farmhouse	II	Crittenden Road			24 August 1990	TQ6613643013; 51°09′44″N 0°22′29″E		1249096	Upload Photo	Q26541259
Gedges Farmhouse Including Wall Forming North East Boundary of the Garden	II	Crittenden Road			24 August 1990	TQ6609543028; 51°09′45″N 0°22′27″E		1249142	Upload Photo	Q26541305
Little Crittenden	II	Crittenden Road			24 August 1990	TQ6563843378; 51°09′56″N 0°22′04″E		1254229	Upload Photo	Q26545912
Pimms	II	Crittenden Road			24 August 1990	TQ6569042377; 51°09′24″N 0°22′05″E		1277568	Upload Photo	Q26566974
Ashmede	II	Crooke Road, Castle Hill			24 August 1990	TQ6928842337; 51°09′19″N 0°25′10″E		1263695	Upload Photo	Q26554468
Castle Hill Cottages	II	Crooke Road, Castle Hill			24 August 1990	TQ6910142373; 51°09′20″N 0°25′00″E		1249519	Upload Photo	Q26541649
Hatchways	II	Crooke Road, Castle Hill			24 August 1990	TQ6921542334; 51°09′19″N 0°25′06″E		1249520	Upload Photo	Q26541650
The Crook	II	Crooke Road			24 August 1990	TQ6917642365; 51°09′20″N 0°25′04″E		1249518	Upload Photo	Q26541648
Old Cryals	II*	Cryals Road			24 August 1990	TQ6613140337; 51°08′18″N 0°22′24″E		1249521	Upload Photo	Q17547527
Little Dunks Farmhouse	II	Cuckoo Lane			24 August 1990	TQ6657238719; 51°07′25″N 0°22′44″E		1249523	Upload Photo	Q26541652
Oasthouse About 15 Metres North East of Little Dunks Farmhouse	II	Cuckoo Lane			24 August 1990	TQ6660038746; 51°07′26″N 0°22′45″E		1249524	Upload Photo	Q26541653
Rowley Plain	II	Cuckoo Lane			24 August 1990	TQ6717339231; 51°07′41″N 0°23′16″E		1249522	Upload Photo	Q26541651
Barn About 10 Metres South East of Hodges	II	Dundle Lane			24 August 1990	TQ6446839872; 51°08′04″N 0°20′58″E		1249527	Upload Photo	Q26541656
Elmhurst	II	Dundle Lane			24 August 1990	TQ6423539527; 51°07′53″N 0°20′45″E		1249525	Upload Photo	Q26541654
Hodges	II	Dundle Lane			24 August 1990	TQ6446339895; 51°08′05″N 0°20′57″E		1249526	Upload Photo	Q26541655
Barn Immediately South West of Chill Mill	II	Fairmans Lane			24 August 1990	TQ6753140744; 51°08′29″N 0°23′37″E		1263697	Upload Photo	Q26554470
Brattles Grange	II	Fairmans Lane			20 October 1954	TQ6744040392; 51°08′18″N 0°23′31″E		1249579	Upload Photo	Q26541701
Chill Mill	II	Fairmans Lane			20 October 1954	TQ6753740773; 51°08′30″N 0°23′37″E		1249573	Upload Photo	Q26541695
Gatehouse Cottages	II	3, Fairmans Lane			24 August 1990	TQ6785741429; 51°08′51″N 0°23′55″E		1249529	Upload Photo	Q26541658
Gatehouse Cottages	II	1 and 2, Fairmans Lane			24 August 1990	TQ6785541446; 51°08′52″N 0°23′54″E		1263696	Upload Photo	Q26682289
Gatehouse Farmhouse	II	Fairmans Lane			20 October 1954	TQ6785341472; 51°08′52″N 0°23′54″E		1249528	Upload Photo	Q26541657
Woodlands	II	Fairmans Lane			20 October 1954	TQ6799041117; 51°08′41″N 0°24′01″E		1263686	Upload Photo	Q26554460
Hononton Farmhouse	II	Furnace Lane			24 August 1990	TQ6883141373; 51°08′48″N 0°24′45″E		1249599	Upload Photo	Q26541717
Wrangling Cottage	II	Furnace Lane			24 August 1990	TQ6963041746; 51°08′59″N 0°25′26″E		1263698	Upload Photo	Q26554471
Wrangling Green	II	Furnace Lane			24 August 1990	TQ6972741820; 51°09′02″N 0°25′31″E		1249530	Upload Photo	Q26541659
Walls, Gate Piers, Railings and Gates to the Garden South and West of Matfield House	II*	Gate Piers, Railings And Gates To The Garden South And West Of Matfield House, The Green, Matfield			20 October 1954	TQ6579841909; 51°09′09″N 0°22′09″E		1263149	Upload Photo	Q17547623
Barn About 40 Metres South West of Maynards	II	Gedges Hill			24 August 1990	TQ6642642366; 51°09′23″N 0°22′42″E		1249602	Upload Photo	Q26541720
Maynards	II	Gedges Hill			24 August 1990	TQ6646242373; 51°09′23″N 0°22′44″E		1263654	Upload Photo	Q26554430
Pippins	II	Gedges Hill			24 August 1990	TQ6637442729; 51°09′35″N 0°22′40″E		1249601	Upload Photo	Q26541719
Weirleigh	II	Gedges Hill			24 August 1990	TQ6643942741; 51°09′35″N 0°22′44″E		1249600	Upload Photo	Q26541718
Kippings Cross Farmhouse	II	Hastings Road			24 August 1990	TQ6441240063; 51°08′10″N 0°20′55″E		1263655	Upload Photo	Q26554431
Brookside Cottage	II	Hatmill Lane			24 August 1990	TQ6773141353; 51°08′49″N 0°23′48″E		1249603	Upload Photo	Q26541721
2 Chest Tombs About 9 Metres South East of the Porch of the Church of All Saints	II	2 Chest Tombs About 9 Metres South East Of The Porch Of The Church Of All Saints, High Street, Brenchley			24 August 1990	TQ6796641751; 51°09′01″N 0°24′01″E		1263494	Upload Photo	Q26554280
2 Headstones and 5 Bodystones About 21 Metres South East of the Chancel of the Church of All Saints	II	2 Headstones And 5 Bodystones About 21 Metres South East Of The Chancel Of The Church Of All Saints, High Street, Brenchley			24 August 1990	TQ6800241692; 51°08′59″N 0°24′02″E		1250002	Upload Photo	Q26542082
2 Wimshurst Memorials Immediately East of the North Transept of the Church of All Saints	II	2 Wimshurst Memorials Immediately East Of The North Transept Of The Church Of All Saints, High Street, Brenchley			24 August 1990	TQ6797941720; 51°09′00″N 0°24′01″E		1250067	Upload Photo	Q26542142
2 Woodgate Headstones About 3 Metres South of the South Transept of the Church of All Saints	II	2 Woodgate Headstones About 3 Metres South Of The South Transept Of The Church Of All Saints, High Street, Brenchley			24 August 1990	TQ6797941692; 51°08′59″N 0°24′01″E		1263449	Upload Photo	Q26554239
3 Wimshurst Headstones and 5 Bodystones About 10 Metres South East of the Porch of the Church of All Saints	II	3 Wimshurst Headstones And 5 Bodystones About 10 Metres South East Of The Porch Of The Church Of All Saints, High Street, Brenchley			24 August 1990	TQ6796741751; 51°09′01″N 0°24′01″E		1263448	Upload Photo	Q26554238
Barn About 20 Metres East of Portobello	II	High Street, Brenchley			24 August 1990	TQ6783941920; 51°09′07″N 0°23′54″E		1249606	Upload Photo	Q26541724
Bournes Shop and House Adjoining at the West	II	High Street, Brenchley			20 October 1954	TQ6788041798; 51°09′03″N 0°23′56″E		1250069	Upload Photo	Q26542144
Chest Tomb About 1 Metre East of the Chancel of the Church of All Saints	II	High Street, Brenchley			24 August 1990	TQ6799041711; 51°09′00″N 0°24′02″E		1250001	Upload Photo	Q26542081
Church House	II	High Street, Brenchley			20 October 1954	TQ6796041802; 51°09′03″N 0°24′00″E		1249607	Upload Photo	Q26541725
Edward Down Headstone About 13 Metres South of the South Transept of the Church of All Saints	II	High Street, Brenchley			24 August 1990	TQ6797441687; 51°08′59″N 0°24′01″E		1250006	Upload Photo	Q26542086
Elizabeth Fuggle Headstone About 9 Metres South West of the Tower of the Church of All Saints	II	High Street, Brenchley			24 August 1990	TQ6794141695; 51°09′00″N 0°23′59″E		1263460	Upload Photo	Q26554250
Fielder Chest Tomb and Railings About 5 Metres North of the North Transept of the Church of All Saints	II	High Street, Brenchley			24 August 1990	TQ6797341727; 51°09′01″N 0°24′01″E		1263459	Upload Photo	Q26554249
Francis Bully Headstone About 4 Metres South East of the South Transept of the Church of All Saints	II	High Street, Brenchley			24 August 1990	TQ6798141691; 51°08′59″N 0°24′01″E		1263457	Upload Photo	Q26554247
Frith and Osborne Chest Tombs About 7 Metres East of the North Transept of the Church of All Saints	II	High Street, Brenchley			24 August 1990	TQ6798341720; 51°09′00″N 0°24′01″E		1250007	Upload Photo	Q26542087
Garden Walls and Railings West and South of Portobello Including Pedestrian Gate and Piers to Carriage Gate	II	High Street, Brenchley			24 August 1990	TQ6780241887; 51°09′06″N 0°23′52″E		1263657	Upload Photo	Q26554434
Hooker Memorial Immediately West of the North Transept of the Church of All Saints	II	High Street, Brenchley			24 August 1990	TQ6797041698; 51°09′00″N 0°24′01″E		1263461	Upload Photo	Q26554251
John Boulds Headstone About 4 Metres South of the Tower of the Church of All Saints	II	High Street, Brenchley			24 August 1990	TQ6795541694; 51°09′00″N 0°24′00″E		1250003	Upload Photo	Q26542083
John Hanbury Headstone About 23 Metres North West of the Tower of the Church of All Saints	II	High Street, Brenchley			24 August 1990	TQ6793441728; 51°09′01″N 0°23′59″E		1250009	Upload Photo	Q26542089
John Mileiss Headstone About 13 Metres South of the South Aisle of the Church of All Saints	II	High Street, Brenchley			24 August 1990	TQ6796541693; 51°08′59″N 0°24′01″E		1263446	Upload Photo	Q26554236
Jonathan Monckton Chest Tomb About 4 Metres South of the Priests' Door in the South Wall of the Chancel of the Church of All Saints	II	High Street, Brenchley			24 August 1990	TQ6798241699; 51°09′00″N 0°24′01″E		1263463	Upload Photo	Q26554253
Lychgate and Churchyard Walls to the Parish Church of All Saints	II	High Street, Brenchley			24 August 1990	TQ6796041756; 51°09′02″N 0°24′00″E		1249610	Upload Photo	Q26541726
Mainwaring Memorial About 39 Metres South of the South Transept of the Church of All Saints	II	High Street, Brenchley			24 August 1990	TQ6798941669; 51°08′59″N 0°24′02″E		1263462	Upload Photo	Q26554252
Matthew Diamond Headstone About 11 Metres South West of the West Door of the Church of All Saints	II	High Street, Brenchley			24 August 1990	TQ6794041699; 51°09′00″N 0°23′59″E		1263458	Upload Photo	Q26554248
Pair of Noakes Headstones and Railings in the South East Corner of the Churchyard of the Church of All Saints	II	High Street, Brenchley			24 August 1990	TQ6798341657; 51°08′58″N 0°24′01″E		1250063	Upload Photo	Q26542138
Pair of Prall Headstones About 5 Metres North of the Tower of the Church of All Saints	II	High Street, Brenchley			24 August 1990	TQ6795441716; 51°09′00″N 0°24′00″E		1250064	Upload Photo	Q26542139
Parish Church of All Saints	I	High Street, Brenchley	church building		20 October 1954	TQ6796941708; 51°09′00″N 0°24′01″E		1249609	Parish Church of All Saints More images	Q17524613
Park Cottage	II	High Street, Brenchley			24 August 1990	TQ6783441837; 51°09′04″N 0°23′54″E		1263385	Upload Photo	Q26554178
Portobello	II	High Street, Brenchley			20 October 1954	TQ6781341889; 51°09′06″N 0°23′53″E		1263656	Upload Photo	Q26554432
Richard Wells Headstone Immediately East of the North Transept of the Church of All Saints	II	High Street, Brenchley			24 August 1990	TQ6798041718; 51°09′00″N 0°24′01″E		1263447	Upload Photo	Q26554237
Richard Wills Headstone About 14 Metres South of the South Aisle of the Church of All Saints	II	High Street, Brenchley			24 August 1990	TQ6796641689; 51°08′59″N 0°24′01″E		1250066	Upload Photo	Q26542141
Row of 5 Diamond Headstones, 6 Footstones and 2 Bodystones About 10 Metres West of the West Door of the Church of All Saints	II	6 Footstones And 2 Bodystones About 10 Metres West Of The West Door Of The Church Of All Saints, High Street, Brenchley			24 August 1990	TQ6794141707; 51°09′00″N 0°23′59″E		1250005	Upload Photo	Q26542085
South Cottage	II	High Street			20 October 1954	TQ6794541795; 51°09′03″N 0°24′00″E		1249643	Upload Photo	Q26541756
Stephen Monkton Memorial and Railings About 20 Metres South East of the Chancel of the Church of All Saints	II	High Street, Brenchley			24 August 1990	TQ6800241695; 51°08′59″N 0°24′02″E		1250061	Upload Photo	Q26542136
Storr Ledger Stone and Railings About 27 Metres South West of the Tower of the Church of All Saints	II	High Street, Brenchley			24 August 1990	TQ6793641671; 51°08′59″N 0°23′59″E		1250065	Upload Photo	Q26542140
Terry's Town Farm Cottage Town Farmhouse	II*	High Street, Brenchley	farmhouse		20 October 1954	TQ6798141778; 51°09′02″N 0°24′01″E		1249608	Terry's Town Farm Cottage Town Farmhouse More images	Q17547532
The Bull Public House	II	High Street, Brenchley	pub		24 August 1990	TQ6792441771; 51°09′02″N 0°23′59″E		1250068	The Bull Public House More images	Q26542143
The Cottage South East of Portobello Including Walls to the Garden East of Portobello	II	High Street, Brenchley			24 August 1990	TQ6783041888; 51°09′06″N 0°23′54″E		1249605	Upload Photo	Q26541723
The Drinking Fountain	II	High Street, Brenchley			24 August 1990	TQ6796241775; 51°09′02″N 0°24′00″E		1249647	Upload Photo	Q26541760
The Old Palace	II*	High Street, Brenchley	architectural structure		20 October 1954	TQ6791241800; 51°09′03″N 0°23′58″E		1263658	The Old Palace More images	Q17547634
The Old Vicarage	II*	High Street, Brenchley			20 October 1954	TQ6793641759; 51°09′02″N 0°23′59″E		1250138	Upload Photo	Q17547542
The Old Workhouse	II*	1-3, High Street, Brenchley	architectural structure		20 October 1954	TQ6778441855; 51°09′05″N 0°23′51″E		1250070	The Old Workhouse More images	Q17547537
The War Memorial	II	High Street, Brenchley	war memorial		24 August 1990	TQ6778441884; 51°09′06″N 0°23′52″E		1249604	The War Memorial More images	Q26541722
The White House	II	High Street, Brenchley			20 October 1954	TQ6791041781; 51°09′02″N 0°23′58″E		1250163	Upload Photo	Q26542231
Thomas Hickmott Headstone About 19 Metres North of the Chancel of the Church of All Saints	II	High Street, Brenchley			24 August 1990	TQ6798141736; 51°09′01″N 0°24′01″E		1250010	Upload Photo	Q26542090
Thomas Monkton Chest Tomb About 21 Metres South East of the Chancel of the Church of All Saints	II	High Street, Brenchley			24 August 1990	TQ6800041694; 51°08′59″N 0°24′02″E		1250062	Upload Photo	Q26542137
Walters Farmhouse	II	High Street, Brenchley, Tonbridge, TN12 7NU			24 August 1990	TQ6776841859; 51°09′05″N 0°23′51″E		1250181	Upload Photo	Q26542247
William Clark Headstone About 11 Metres South of the Chancel of the Church of All Saints	II	High Street, Brenchley			24 August 1990	TQ6798541693; 51°08′59″N 0°24′02″E		1250004	Upload Photo	Q26542084
William Gibbons Headstone About 9 Metres South of the South Aisle of the Church of All Saints	II	High Street, Brenchley			24 August 1990	TQ6796141694; 51°09′00″N 0°24′00″E		1250008	Upload Photo	Q26542088
Halfway Cottage	II	Horsmonden Road			24 August 1990	TQ6820341383; 51°08′49″N 0°24′12″E		1263451	Upload Photo	Q26554241
Halfway House Public House	II	Horsmonden Road	pub		24 August 1990	TQ6821341366; 51°08′49″N 0°24′13″E		1250186	Halfway House Public House More images	Q26542252
Acer Cottage	II	Maidstone Road, Matfield			24 August 1990	TQ6606142077; 51°09′14″N 0°22′23″E		1250190	Upload Photo	Q26542256
Chapel of Ease of St Luke	II	Maidstone Road, Matfield	church building		24 August 1990	TQ6537240844; 51°08′35″N 0°21′46″E		1263395	Chapel of Ease of St Luke More images	Q26554187
Kings Toll Farmhouse	II	Maidstone Road			20 October 1954	TQ6471540386; 51°08′21″N 0°21′11″E		1250188	Upload Photo	Q26542254
Matfield War Memorial	II	Maidstone Road	war memorial		16 August 2001	TQ6541540867; 51°08′35″N 0°21′48″E		1389374	Matfield War Memorial More images	Q26668812
North West Lychgate to the Chapel of Ease of St Luke	II	Maidstone Road, Matfield			24 August 1990	TQ6536040861; 51°08′35″N 0°21′45″E		1250194	Upload Photo	Q26542260
Row of 4 Sharp Chest Tombs Immediately South East of the Chancel of the Chapel of Ease of St Luke	II	Maidstone Road, Matfield			24 August 1990	TQ6538940838; 51°08′35″N 0°21′47″E		1250196	Upload Photo	Q26542262
South East Lychgate to the Chapel of Ease of St Luke	II	Maidstone Road, Matfield			24 August 1990	TQ6539540802; 51°08′33″N 0°21′47″E		1250195	Upload Photo	Q26542261
Storr Memorial About 20 Metres South East of the Chancel of the Chapel of Ease of St Luke	II	Maidstone Road, Matfield			24 August 1990	TQ6540440835; 51°08′34″N 0°21′47″E		1263397	Upload Photo	Q26554189
The Poet at Matfield	II	Maidstone Road, Matfield, Tonbridge, TN12 7JH	pub		24 August 1990	TQ6609042106; 51°09′15″N 0°22′25″E		1250191	The Poet at Matfield More images	Q26542257
The Star Public House	II	Maidstone Road, Matfield	pub		24 August 1990	TQ6592541935; 51°09′09″N 0°22′16″E		1250189	The Star Public House More images	Q26542255
Thorn Cottages	II	Maidstone Road, Matfield			24 August 1990	TQ6634742267; 51°09′20″N 0°22′38″E		1250192	Upload Photo	Q26542258
Thorn House	II	Maidstone Road, Matfield			24 August 1990	TQ6611242088; 51°09′14″N 0°22′26″E		1250193	Upload Photo	Q26542259
Wilshin Memorial Immediately South of the Vestry of the Chapel of Ease of St Luke	II	Maidstone Road, Matfield			24 August 1990	TQ6538440835; 51°08′34″N 0°21′46″E		1263396	Upload Photo	Q26554188
Gazebo in the Garden South East of Marle Place	II	Marle Place Road			24 August 1990	TQ6814039754; 51°07′57″N 0°24′06″E		1250197	Upload Photo	Q26542263
Marle Place Including Courtyard Wall and Gateway Wall to the North West	II	Marle Place Road			20 October 1954	TQ6809039787; 51°07′58″N 0°24′04″E		1250611	Upload Photo	Q26542652
Garden Walls to the Garden South and East of Marle Place Including Gateway to the Courtyard	II	Marle Road			24 August 1990	TQ6814239788; 51°07′58″N 0°24′06″E		1250198	Upload Photo	Q26542264
Holly Tree Cottage	II	Mile Oak			24 August 1990	TQ6810543443; 51°09′56″N 0°24′11″E		1251133	Upload Photo	Q26543127
Hoppers Cottage the Roundels	II	Mile Oak			24 August 1990	TQ6809743465; 51°09′57″N 0°24′10″E		1251132	Upload Photo	Q26543126
Mile Oak Cottage	II	Mile Oak			24 August 1990	TQ6809943485; 51°09′57″N 0°24′10″E		1263153	Upload Photo	Q26553961
Watermans	II	Mile Oak			24 August 1990	TQ6809543427; 51°09′55″N 0°24′10″E		1262924	Upload Photo	Q26553762
Former Rose and Crown Public House	II	1-3, Old Inn Cottage, Brenchley, TN12 7NQ	pub		20 October 1954	TQ6787041805; 51°09′03″N 0°23′56″E		1263450	Former Rose and Crown Public House More images	Q26554240
Hononton Cottage	II	Palmers Green Lane			24 August 1990	TQ6879241720; 51°08′59″N 0°24′43″E		1251134	Upload Photo	Q26543128
Petteridge Place	II	Petteridge Lane, Brenchley			24 August 1990	TQ6715441677; 51°09′00″N 0°23′19″E		1262925	Upload Photo	Q26553763
Flightshott	II	Spout Lane			2 February 1979	TQ6850040287; 51°08′13″N 0°24′26″E		1251135	Upload Photo	Q26543129
Converted Barn About 40 Metres North of Wat Tyler's Cottage	II	The Crook			24 August 1990	TQ6835342299; 51°09′19″N 0°24′21″E		1263694	Upload Photo	Q26554467
Oasthouse About 45 Metres North East of Wat Tyler's Cottage	II	The Crook			24 August 1990	TQ6837042303; 51°09′19″N 0°24′22″E		1249098	Upload Photo	Q26541261
Wat Tylers Cottage	II	The Crook			20 October 1954	TQ6834842246; 51°09′17″N 0°24′21″E		1249097	Upload Photo	Q26541260
Barn West of Hatherleigh	II	The Green, Matfield			24 August 1990	TQ6571741920; 51°09′09″N 0°22′05″E		1263147	Upload Photo	Q26553957
Canterbury Cottage Hodge Cottage	II	The Green, Matfield Green			24 August 1990	TQ6576841923; 51°09′09″N 0°22′08″E		1250643	Upload Photo	Q26542681
Cherry Trees Including Post Office and Art Gallery	II	The Green, Matfield			24 August 1990	TQ6593741885; 51°09′08″N 0°22′17″E		1250649	Upload Photo	Q26542683
Coach House About 40 Metres North East of Matfield House	II*	The Green, Matfield			20 October 1954	TQ6585441938; 51°09′10″N 0°22′12″E		1263150	Upload Photo	Q17547629
Cottage Immediately North West of Hatherleigh	II	The Green, Matfield			24 August 1990	TQ6572741905; 51°09′09″N 0°22′06″E		1250642	Upload Photo	Q26542680
Forge Cottage	II	The Green, Matfield			20 October 1954	TQ6578641732; 51°09′03″N 0°22′09″E		1250633	Upload Photo	Q26542672
Hatherliegh Including Garden Walls and Gate to the East	II	The Green, Matfield			20 October 1954	TQ6574341901; 51°09′09″N 0°22′07″E		1250641	Upload Photo	Q26542679
Homecroft Cottage	II	The Green, Matfield			24 August 1990	TQ6572041881; 51°09′08″N 0°22′05″E		1263146	Upload Photo	Q26553956
Lees Court	II	The Green, Matfield			20 October 1954	TQ6562741765; 51°09′04″N 0°22′00″E		1250640	Upload Photo	Q26542678
Masters	II	The Green, Matfield			24 August 1990	TQ6587841842; 51°09′06″N 0°22′13″E		1263152	Upload Photo	Q26553960
Matfield House	I	The Green, Matfield, TN12 7JT	building		20 October 1954	TQ6581541928; 51°09′09″N 0°22′10″E		1250644	Matfield House More images	Q17524626
Matfield House Cottages	II*	1-3, The Green, Matfield	cottage		20 October 1954	TQ6586841907; 51°09′09″N 0°22′13″E		1250648	Matfield House Cottages More images	Q17547553
Maycots	II	The Green, Matfield			24 August 1990	TQ6575942010; 51°09′12″N 0°22′08″E		1263148	Upload Photo	Q26553958
Mounting Block Immediately East of Matfield House	II	The Green, Matfield			24 August 1990	TQ6583241934; 51°09′09″N 0°22′11″E		1250645	Upload Photo	Q26542682
Oasthouse About 100 Metres North of Matfield House	II	The Green, Matfield			24 August 1990	TQ6586942053; 51°09′13″N 0°22′13″E		1263151	Upload Photo	Q26553959
Stable Block Immediately North East of Matfield House	I	The Green, Matfield	stable		20 October 1954	TQ6583541943; 51°09′10″N 0°22′11″E		1250646	Stable Block Immediately North East of Matfield House More images	Q17524632
Stable Building About 50 Metres East of Matfield House	II*	The Green, Matfield			20 October 1954	TQ6585541919; 51°09′09″N 0°22′12″E		1250647	Upload Photo	Q17547547
The Forge	II	The Green, Matfield			24 August 1990	TQ6578641722; 51°09′03″N 0°22′09″E		1263398	Upload Photo	Q26554190
The Old Laundry	II	The Green, Matfield			24 August 1990	TQ6586441810; 51°09′05″N 0°22′13″E		1250650	Upload Photo	Q26542684
The Wheelwright's Arms	II	The Green, Matfield	pub		24 August 1990	TQ6578341700; 51°09′02″N 0°22′08″E		1250624	The Wheelwright's Arms More images	Q26542663
The White House	II	The Green, Matfield			20 October 1954	TQ6578341742; 51°09′03″N 0°22′08″E		1250199	Upload Photo	Q26681385
Tutty's Farmhouse	II	The Green, Matfield			24 August 1990	TQ6585241701; 51°09′02″N 0°22′12″E		1262923	Upload Photo	Q26553761
Hilltop Cottage	II	Tibbs Court Lane			24 August 1990	TQ6680941226; 51°08′46″N 0°23′00″E		1251137	Upload Photo	Q26543131
No. 3 Bourne Cottages	II	3 Bourne Cottages, Tibbs Court Lane			24 August 1990	TQ6683241242; 51°08′46″N 0°23′02″E		1251136	Upload Photo	Q26543130
The Cottage	II	Tibbs Court Lane			24 August 1990	TQ6691141247; 51°08′46″N 0°23′06″E		1262926	Upload Photo	Q26553764
Old Tong Farmhouse	II*	Tong Road			20 October 1954	TQ6749039735; 51°07′57″N 0°23′33″E		1251138	Upload Photo	Q17547558
Biggenden Farmhouse	II	Watermans Lane			24 August 1990	TQ6761643272; 51°09′51″N 0°23′45″E		1262928	Upload Photo	Q26553766
Marchant Chest Tomb and Railings About 19 Metres North of the Church Porch, West Side of the Path	II	West Side Of The Path, High Street, Brenchley			24 August 1990	TQ6796041737; 51°09′01″N 0°24′00″E		1250012	Upload Photo	Q26542092
Marchant Chest Tomb and Railings About 13 Metres North of the Church Porch, West Side of the Path of the Church of All Saints	II	West Side Of The Path Of The Church Of All Saints, High Street, Brenchley			24 August 1990	TQ6796041730; 51°09′01″N 0°24′00″E		1250011	Upload Photo	Q26542091
Hill House	II	Windmil Hill, Brenchley			24 August 1990	TQ6796441873; 51°09′05″N 0°24′01″E		1251140	Upload Photo	Q26543133
Little Broad Oak Including Railings and Gate to Garden to the West and Brick Walls to Garden to the East	II	Windmill Hill, Brenchley			20 October 1954	TQ6798041844; 51°09′04″N 0°24′02″E		1251139	Upload Photo	Q26543132
Little Portobello Including Garden Railings to the West	II	Windmill Hill, Brenchley			20 October 1954	TQ6794941859; 51°09′05″N 0°24′00″E		1251142	Upload Photo	Q26543135
Mill Cottage	II	Windmill Hill, Brenchley			24 August 1990	TQ6792742168; 51°09′15″N 0°23′59″E		1251141	Upload Photo	Q26543134
The View	II	Windmill Hill, Brenchley			24 August 1990	TQ6792942220; 51°09′17″N 0°24′00″E		1262929	Upload Photo	Q26553767
Burtons	II	Yew Tree Road			24 August 1990	TQ6957742276; 51°09′17″N 0°25′24″E		1251195	Upload Photo	Q26543179

== See also ==
- Grade I listed buildings in Kent
- Grade II* listed buildings in Kent

== Sources ==
- Newman, John (2012) [1969], Kent: West and the Weald, The Buildings of England, New Haven and London: Yale University Press, ISBN 978-0-300-18509-6
