= Listed buildings in Lamberhurst =

Historic buildings in Kent, England

Lamberhurst is a village and civil parish in the Borough of Tunbridge Wells of Kent, England. It contains three grade I, one grade II* and 136 grade II listed buildings that are recorded in the National Heritage List for England.

This list is based on the information retrieved online from Historic England.

== Key ==
Grade	Criteria
I	Buildings that are of exceptional interest
II*	Particularly important buildings of more than special interest
II	Buildings that are of special interest

== Listing ==
Name	Grade	Location	Type	Completed (Note: The date given is the date used by Historic England as significant for the initial building or that of an important part in the structure's description.)	Date designated	Grid ref. (Note: The grid reference is based on the British national grid reference system, sometimes known as OSGB36, used by the Ordnance Survey.) Geo-coordinates	Notes	Entry number (Note: The "List Entry Number" is a unique number assigned to each listed building and scheduled monument by Historic England.)	Image	Wikidata
Barn and Outbuildings East of Old Swan Farmhouse	II				15 June 1988	TQ6522838778; 51°07′28″N 0°21′35″E		1336675	Upload Photo	Q26621153
Oasthouse at Little Scotney Farm	II				10 October 1989	TQ6950536246; 51°06′02″N 0°25′10″E		1085290	Upload Photo	Q26371767
Bayham Abbey and garden terraces	II				20 October 1954	TQ6445336819; 51°06′25″N 0°20′52″E		1121925	Upload Photo	Q26415067
Lindridge Lodge	II				10 October 1989	TQ6631838082; 51°07′04″N 0°22′30″E		1186879	Upload Photo	Q26482121
K6 Telephone Kiosk Outside Village Hall	II	A21			10 October 1989	TQ6760636193; 51°06′02″N 0°23′33″E		1084516	Upload Photo	Q26368223
Gates and Piers About 100 Metres North West of Bayham Abbey	II	Bayham Abbey			10 October 1989	TQ6424436906; 51°06′29″N 0°20′41″E		1084517	Upload Photo	Q26368224
Gate Lodge About 100 Metres North West of Bayham Abbey	II	Bayham Abbey			10 October 1989	TQ6424636920; 51°06′29″N 0°20′41″E		1338565	Upload Photo	Q26622879
Former stable courtyard about 20 metres north east of Bayham Abbey	II	Bayham Abbey			10 October 1989	TQ6447436890; 51°06′28″N 0°20′53″E		1338794	Upload Photo	Q26623086
Christmas Cottage and 28 and 30 Brewer Street	II	Brewer Street			10 October 1989	TQ6755736398; 51°06′09″N 0°23′31″E		1121911	Upload Photo	Q26415052
Bradworth Lodge Cromwell House	II	Church Lane			10 October 1989	TQ6782636705; 51°06′18″N 0°23′45″E		1084518	Upload Photo	Q26368226
Church of St Mary	I	Church Lane			20 October 1954	TQ6820736580; 51°06′14″N 0°24′04″E		1084519	Upload Photo	Q17530340
Monument to Pomfret Family, About 20 Metres South West of Church of St Mary	II	Church Lane			10 October 1989	TQ6818536554; 51°06′13″N 0°24′03″E		1084520	Upload Photo	Q26368227
Group of Four Chest Tombs About 5 to 20 Metres South of Church of St Mary	II	Church Lane			10 October 1989	TQ6821236560; 51°06′13″N 0°24′05″E		1123704	Upload Photo	Q26416775
Chest Tomb to Morland Family, About 10 Metres West of Church of St Mary	II	Church Lane			10 October 1989	TQ6818236570; 51°06′14″N 0°24′03″E		1337697	Upload Photo	Q26622088
Court Lodge Stable Yard and Walled Gardens	II	Church Lane			20 October 1954	TQ6806736598; 51°06′15″N 0°23′57″E		1338588	Upload Photo	Q26622900
Hook Green House	II	Clay Hill Road			10 October 1989	TQ6555835951; 51°05′56″N 0°21′47″E		1084521	Upload Photo	Q26368228
Bridge Over River Teise at TQ 657 365	II	Clay Hill Road			10 October 1989	TQ6567336470; 51°06′13″N 0°21′54″E		1084522	Upload Photo	Q26368230
Clay Hill Cottages	II	Clay Hill Road			10 October 1989	TQ6555037971; 51°07′02″N 0°21′50″E		1084523	Upload Photo	Q26368231
Bridge About 30 Metres North West of Bayham L'eglise	II	Clay Hill Road			10 October 1989	TQ6501436683; 51°06′21″N 0°21′21″E		1085295	Upload Photo	Q26371796
Sandhurst Farnhouse	II	Clay Hill Road			10 October 1989	TQ6485037987; 51°07′03″N 0°21′14″E		1111762	Upload Photo	Q26405561
Hoathly Farmhouse	II	Clay Hill Road			10 October 1989	TQ6573736652; 51°06′19″N 0°21′58″E		1123707	Upload Photo	Q26416783
Bayham Leglise	II	Clay Hill Road			24 July 1989	TQ6511036652; 51°06′19″N 0°21′25″E		1336704	Upload Photo	Q26621181
Cottages at Snaggs Well	II	Clay Hill Road			10 October 1989	TQ6569737318; 51°06′40″N 0°21′57″E		1338795	Upload Photo	Q26623087
Barn About 10 Metres West of Three Chimneys	II	Cousley Wood			10 October 1989	TQ6478534263; 51°05′02″N 0°21′05″E		1085296	Upload Photo	Q26371803
Three Chimneys	II	Cousley Wood			10 October 1989	TQ6480234264; 51°05′02″N 0°21′06″E		1336705	Upload Photo	Q26621182
Dundale Farmhouse	II	Dundale Road			10 October 1989	TQ6297738400; 51°07′18″N 0°19′39″E		1085297	Upload Photo	Q26371808
Bridge Over River Teise	II	Dundale Road			10 October 1989	TQ6289238477; 51°07′21″N 0°19′34″E		1336706	Upload Photo	Q26621183
Hook Green Farmhouse	II	Free Heath Road			10 October 1989	TQ6551035720; 51°05′49″N 0°21′44″E		1085298	Upload Photo	Q26371814
Apps Farmhouse	II	Free Heath Road			10 October 1989	TQ6519335768; 51°05′51″N 0°21′28″E		1085299	Upload Photo	Q26371820
Post Office Cottage/trafalgar Lodge	II	Free Heath Road			9 August 1979	TQ6529235747; 51°05′50″N 0°21′33″E		1336707	Upload Photo	Q26621184
Hall Cottage Inglenook	II	Furnace Lane			10 October 1989	TQ6708735542; 51°05′41″N 0°23′05″E		1085300	Upload Photo	Q26371824
Furnace Farmhouse	II	Furnace Lane			10 October 1989	TQ6666135578; 51°05′43″N 0°22′43″E		1085301	Upload Photo	Q26371831
Furnace Mill Farmhouse	II	Furnace Lane			10 October 1989	TQ6612036143; 51°06′02″N 0°22′16″E		1085302	Upload Photo	Q26371835
Oasthouse About 30 Metres North East of Furnace Mill House	II	Furnace Lane			10 October 1989	TQ6612836170; 51°06′03″N 0°22′17″E		1085303	Upload Photo	Q26371841
Easter Cottage Peter Pan Cottage	II	Furnace Lane			10 October 1989	TQ6674035576; 51°05′43″N 0°22′47″E		1111887	Upload Photo	Q26405701
Wagon Barn About 10 Metres North of Furnace Farmhouse	II	Furnace Lane			10 October 1989	TQ6664635612; 51°05′44″N 0°22′43″E		1111888	Upload Photo	Q26405703
Furnace Mill, Walls and Outbuildings	II	Furnace Lane			10 October 1989	TQ6614736138; 51°06′02″N 0°22′18″E		1336941	Upload Photo	Q26621404
Pittsgate Farmhouse	II	Goudhurst Road			10 October 1989	TQ6855337520; 51°06′44″N 0°24′24″E		1085304	Upload Photo	Q26371847
Barn About 15 Metres West of Pittsgate Farmhouse	II	Goudhurst Road			10 October 1989	TQ6852937523; 51°06′44″N 0°24′23″E		1111893	Upload Photo	Q26405709
Spray Hill Farmhouse	II	Hastings Road			10 October 1989	TQ6777435398; 51°05′36″N 0°23′40″E		1085305	Upload Photo	Q26371852
Oasthouse About 50 Metres South of Spray Hill Farmhouse	II	Hastings Road			10 October 1989	TQ6776635348; 51°05′34″N 0°23′40″E		1085306	Upload Photo	Q26371859
Oasthouse 15 Metres East of Whisketts Farmhouse	II	Hastings Road			10 October 1989	TQ6768535006; 51°05′23″N 0°23′35″E		1085307	Upload Photo	Q26371864
Barn About 25 Metres South of Spray Hill Farmhouse	II	Hastings Road			10 October 1989	TQ6776335372; 51°05′35″N 0°23′40″E		1111894	Upload Photo	Q26405710
Whisketts Farmhouse	II	Hastings Road			10 October 1989	TQ6766835002; 51°05′23″N 0°23′34″E		1111905	Upload Photo	Q26405726
Toll Gate Cottage	II	Hastings Road			10 October 1989	TQ6827534771; 51°05′15″N 0°24′05″E		1336708	Upload Photo	Q26621185
Scotney Castle Lodge	II	Hastings Road			10 October 1989	TQ6772435290; 51°05′33″N 0°23′37″E		1336946	Upload Photo	Q26621409
Barn and Stables 15 Metres North of Whisketts Rarmhouse	II	Hastings Road			10 October 1989	TQ6766335031; 51°05′24″N 0°23′34″E		1336971	Upload Photo	Q26621432
1 and 2, High Street	II	1 and 2, High Street			20 October 1954	TQ6753636119; 51°06′00″N 0°23′29″E		1336710	1 and 2, High Street More images	Q26621187
3, High Street	II	3, High Street			20 October 1954	TQ6752036112; 51°05′59″N 0°23′28″E		1111852	3, High Street More images	Q26405650
4, High Street	II	4, High Street			20 October 1954	TQ6751536110; 51°05′59″N 0°23′28″E		1085310	4, High Street More images	Q26371881
5 and 6, High Street	II	5 and 6, High Street			20 October 1954	TQ6751036107; 51°05′59″N 0°23′28″E		1186849	5 and 6, High Street More images	Q26482091
Mill Cottage	II	High Street			10 October 1989	TQ6750336130; 51°06′00″N 0°23′27″E		1085308	Mill Cottage More images	Q26371870
Hicknotts Cottages	II	High Street			20 October 1954	TQ6755536133; 51°06′00″N 0°23′30″E		1085309	Hicknotts Cottages More images	Q26371875
Arnold House	II	High Street			10 October 1989	TQ6750636133; 51°06′00″N 0°23′28″E		1111875	Upload Photo	Q26405684
Mill Building Now F Hawkins and Sons Limited Premises	II	High Street			10 October 1989	TQ6754936102; 51°05′59″N 0°23′30″E		1111878	Upload Photo	Q26405689
Mill House	II	High Street			10 October 1989	TQ6748636114; 51°06′00″N 0°23′27″E		1336709	Mill House More images	Q26621186
Coachhouse/garage About 10 Metres East of the Elephants Head Public House	II	Hook Green			10 October 1989	TQ6557435867; 51°05′54″N 0°21′48″E		1085311	Upload Photo	Q26371887
Elephants Head Public House	II	Hook Green			10 October 1989	TQ6555935856; 51°05′53″N 0°21′47″E		1298999	Upload Photo	Q26586430
School House School Lodge	II	Hook Green			10 October 1989	TQ6541335894; 51°05′55″N 0°21′40″E		1336711	Upload Photo	Q26621188
Oasthouse About 30 Metres North of Old Farm Farmhouse	II	Lamberhurst Quarter			10 October 1989	TQ6564339236; 51°07′42″N 0°21′57″E		1081544	Upload Photo	Q26357006
Ambleford	II	Lamberhurst Quarter			10 October 1989	TQ6505039137; 51°07′40″N 0°21′26″E		1085312	Upload Photo	Q26371893
Blue Gums	II	Lamberhurst Quarter			10 October 1989	TQ6699037867; 51°06′57″N 0°23′04″E		1085313	Upload Photo	Q26371898
Barn About 50 Metres North West of Old Farm Farmhouse	II	Lamberhurst Quarter			10 October 1989	TQ6558539237; 51°07′43″N 0°21′54″E		1085314	Upload Photo	Q26371903
Old Swan Farmhouse	II	Lamberhurst Quarter			15 June 1988	TQ6520938773; 51°07′28″N 0°21′34″E		1186872	Upload Photo	Q26482113
Old Farm Farmhouse	II	Lamberhurst Quarter			10 October 1989	TQ6564239206; 51°07′41″N 0°21′57″E		1336676	Upload Photo	Q26621154
Lindridge Place	II	Lamberhurst Quarter			10 October 1989	TQ6634038138; 51°07′06″N 0°22′31″E		1350015	Upload Photo	Q26633257
Barn About 50 Metres East of Grantham Hall Cottages	II	London Road			10 October 1989	TQ6769937238; 51°06′36″N 0°23′39″E		1085315	Upload Photo	Q26371909
Grantham Hall Cottages	II	London Road			10 October 1989	TQ6765037217; 51°06′35″N 0°23′37″E		1366272	Upload Photo	Q26647877
Barn About 30 Metres East of Mount Pleasant Farmhouse	II	Mount Pleasant			10 October 1989	TQ6609636885; 51°06′26″N 0°22′16″E		1085273	Upload Photo	Q26371682
The Owl House	II	Mount Pleasant			10 October 1989	TQ6638237289; 51°06′39″N 0°22′32″E		1085274	Upload Photo	Q26371688
Mount Pleasant Farmhouse	II	Mount Pleasant			10 October 1989	TQ6607536913; 51°06′27″N 0°22′15″E		1336677	Upload Photo	Q26621155
Stables about 30 metres south east of Mount Pleasant Farmhouse	II	Mount Pleasant			10 October 1989	TQ6606936878; 51°06′26″N 0°22′15″E		1336695	Upload Photo	Q26621173
Neills Cottage	II	Neills Road			17 July 1987	TQ6585035132; 51°05′29″N 0°22′01″E		1085275	Upload Photo	Q26371693
Bewkes	II	Neills Road			10 October 1989	TQ6568634745; 51°05′17″N 0°21′52″E		1085276	Upload Photo	Q26371699
Crowhurst	II	Neills Road			10 October 1989	TQ6538834594; 51°05′13″N 0°21′36″E		1085277	Upload Photo	Q26371705
Yew Tree Farmhouse	II	Neills Road			10 October 1989	TQ6542634677; 51°05′15″N 0°21′38″E		1336696	Upload Photo	Q26621174
Cutthorn	II	Parsonage Lane			9 July 1973	TQ6756336634; 51°06′16″N 0°23′31″E		1085278	Upload Photo	Q26371709
The Priory	II	Parsonage Lane			15 June 1988	TQ6743836718; 51°06′19″N 0°23′25″E		1336697	Upload Photo	Q26621175
Bedlam	II	1 and 2, School Hill			10 October 1989	TQ6773936594; 51°06′15″N 0°23′40″E		1099123	Upload Photo	Q26391277
Holly House and Ricardes Toft	II	1 and 2, School Hill			30 November 1971	TQ6765036367; 51°06′08″N 0°23′35″E		1336698	Upload Photo	Q26621176
The Charity	II	1-3, School Hill			10 October 1989	TQ6765136388; 51°06′08″N 0°23′35″E		1349065	Upload Photo	Q26632387
Manor Cottages	II	3, School Hill			10 October 1989	TQ6767936444; 51°06′10″N 0°23′37″E		1099105	Upload Photo	Q26391261
5,6,7, School Hill	II	5, 6, 7, School Hill			10 October 1989	TQ6768636466; 51°06′11″N 0°23′37″E		1085283	Upload Photo	Q26371737
Durham Cottages	II	School Hill			10 October 1989	TQ6767636361; 51°06′07″N 0°23′37″E		1085279	Upload Photo	Q26371715
Tyled Cottage	II	School Hill			10 October 1989	TQ6770336405; 51°06′09″N 0°23′38″E		1085280	Upload Photo	Q26371721
Caroline Cottage/youth Club (The Institute)	II	School Hill			10 October 1989	TQ6770336414; 51°06′09″N 0°23′38″E		1085281	Upload Photo	Q26371727
Lamberhust Primary School	II	School Hill			10 October 1989	TQ6769436503; 51°06′12″N 0°23′38″E		1085282	Upload Photo	Q26371732
Campers	II	School Hill			20 October 1954	TQ6767136440; 51°06′10″N 0°23′37″E		1085284	Upload Photo	Q26371744
Tudor Cottage	II	School Hill			20 October 1954	TQ6766636425; 51°06′09″N 0°23′36″E		1085285	Upload Photo	Q26371748
Coggers Hall	II*	School Hill			20 October 1954	TQ6762936322; 51°06′06″N 0°23′34″E		1085286	Upload Photo	Q17547380
Lamberhurst Forge	II	School Hill			10 October 1989	TQ6768436490; 51°06′11″N 0°23′37″E		1099101	Upload Photo	Q26391258
The Tyled House	II	School Hill			10 October 1989	TQ6769036394; 51°06′08″N 0°23′38″E		1099193	Upload Photo	Q26391344
Stair House	II	School Hill			10 October 1989	TQ6766436312; 51°06′06″N 0°23′36″E		1099224	Upload Photo	Q26391377
Wall About 10 Metres East of Coggers Hall	II	School Hill			10 October 1989	TQ6764436320; 51°06′06″N 0°23′35″E		1348530	Upload Photo	Q26631904
Laburnum Cottage	II	School Hill			20 October 1954	TQ6767036434; 51°06′10″N 0°23′37″E		1349062	Upload Photo	Q26632384
Scotney Castle With Courtyards and Garden Terrace	I	Scotney			20 October 1954	TQ6873435373; 51°05′34″N 0°24′29″E		1336699	Scotney Castle With Courtyards and Garden Terrace More images	Q7435720
The Ruins of Old Scotney Castle	I	Scotney			20 October 1954	TQ6896835229; 51°05′29″N 0°24′41″E		1085287	The Ruins of Old Scotney Castle More images	Q17530343
Causeway and Walls About 20 Metres West of Old Scotney Castle	II	Scotney			10 October 1989	TQ6893935232; 51°05′29″N 0°24′40″E		1085288	Causeway and Walls About 20 Metres West of Old Scotney Castle More images	Q26371755
Well Head With the West Courtyard of Old Scotney Castle	II	Scotney			10 October 1989	TQ6895635251; 51°05′30″N 0°24′41″E		1100316	Well Head With the West Courtyard of Old Scotney Castle More images	Q26392426
Walled Garden About 75 Metres North West of Scotney Castle	II	Scotney			10 October 1989	TQ6856035399; 51°05′35″N 0°24′21″E		1100308	Walled Garden About 75 Metres North West of Scotney Castle More images	Q26392412
Boathouse on Outer Island at Old Scotney Castle	II	Scotney			10 October 1989	TQ6889635192; 51°05′28″N 0°24′37″E		1100280	Boathouse on Outer Island at Old Scotney Castle More images	Q26392371
Ice House About 50 Metres North East of Old Scotney Castle	II	Scotney			10 October 1989	TQ6901135330; 51°05′33″N 0°24′44″E		1100289	Upload Photo	Q26392384
Bridge Over the Sweetbourne at TQ 6875 3510	II	Scotney			10 October 1989	TQ6863135087; 51°05′25″N 0°24′24″E		1085289	Upload Photo	Q26371761
Barn at Little Scotney Farm	II	Scotney			10 October 1989	TQ6955036198; 51°06′00″N 0°25′13″E		1100293	Upload Photo	Q26392387
The Bastion	II	Scotney			10 October 1989	TQ6878435337; 51°05′33″N 0°24′32″E		1336700	Upload Photo	Q26621177
Bridge over the River Bewl at TQ 6872 3495	II	Scotney			10 October 1989	TQ6875334965; 51°05′21″N 0°24′30″E		1336701	Upload Photo	Q26621178
Tanyard Cottages	II	1-3, The Broadway			10 October 1989	TQ6759236107; 51°05′59″N 0°23′32″E		1085292	Tanyard Cottages More images	Q26371778
Bridge House	II	The Broadway			10 October 1989	TQ6760736259; 51°06′04″N 0°23′33″E		1085253	Bridge House More images	Q26371569
Outhouse About 1 Metre East of the Chequers Inn	II	The Broadway			10 October 1989	TQ6763936226; 51°06′03″N 0°23′35″E		1085291	Upload Photo	Q26371772
Coggers Farmhouse and Walled Forecourt (Farm Shop and National Westminster Bank)	II	The Broadway			10 October 1989	TQ6759336229; 51°06′03″N 0°23′32″E		1085293	Coggers Farmhouse and Walled Forecourt (Farm Shop and National Westminster Bank) More images	Q26371785
Forge House	II	The Broadway			10 October 1989	TQ6760236244; 51°06′04″N 0°23′33″E		1085294	Forge House More images	Q26371791
The Chequers Inn	II	The Broadway			10 October 1989	TQ6762436231; 51°06′03″N 0°23′34″E		1100271	The Chequers Inn More images	Q26392359
Victoria House	II	The Broadway			20 October 1954	TQ6756136160; 51°06′01″N 0°23′30″E		1101502	Upload Photo	Q26394995
Stable Block About 25 Metres East of the Chequers Inn and Wall Attached	II	The Broadway			10 October 1989	TQ6764336207; 51°06′02″N 0°23′35″E		1101541	Upload Photo	Q26395079
Rope House	II	The Broadway			20 October 1954	TQ6761336172; 51°06′01″N 0°23′33″E		1101546	Rope House More images	Q26395088
Section of Railings Adjoining Village Hall	II	The Broadway			10 October 1989	TQ6761336217; 51°06′03″N 0°23′33″E		1336702	Upload Photo	Q26621179
Coggers Cottages	II	The Broadway			20 October 1954	TQ6756736171; 51°06′01″N 0°23′31″E		1336703	Coggers Cottages More images	Q26621180
Manorden	II	The Broadway			14 October 1970	TQ6758536216; 51°06′03″N 0°23′32″E		1347905	Manorden More images	Q26631326
Down Cottages	II	1-3, The Down			9 July 1973	TQ6733335523; 51°05′41″N 0°23′18″E		1085255	Upload Photo	Q26371580
Down Farm Oasts Down Farm Oasts and Fuggles Oast House	II	3, The Down			9 July 1973	TQ6750235535; 51°05′41″N 0°23′26″E		1336723	Upload Photo	Q26621200
Down Cottages	II	4-6, The Down			10 October 1989	TQ6732335510; 51°05′40″N 0°23′17″E		1336724	Upload Photo	Q26685016
Ridge Farmhouse	II	The Down			10 October 1989	TQ6722435635; 51°05′44″N 0°23′12″E		1068573	Upload Photo	Q26321278
Down Farmhouse	II	The Down			10 October 1989	TQ6752035575; 51°05′42″N 0°23′27″E		1085254	Upload Photo	Q26371575
Down House	II	The Down			10 October 1989	TQ6716035429; 51°05′38″N 0°23′09″E		1085256	Upload Photo	Q26371585
Coachhouse and Stable About 20 Metres North West of Down House	II	The Down			10 October 1989	TQ6714235457; 51°05′39″N 0°23′08″E		1085257	Upload Photo	Q26371590
The Vineyard	II	The Down			10 October 1989	TQ6715335513; 51°05′40″N 0°23′08″E		1085258	Upload Photo	Q26371596
Coachhouse, walls and outbuildings in rear courtyard of The Vineyard	II	The Down			10 October 1989	TQ6715235512; 51°05′40″N 0°23′08″E		1085259	Upload Photo	Q26371602
Oasthouse About 20 Metres South of Ridge Farmhouse	II	The Down			10 October 1989	TQ6719935620; 51°05′44″N 0°23′11″E		1085260	Upload Photo	Q26371607
Bakehouse/brewhouse About 10 Metres West of Down House	II	The Down			10 October 1989	TQ6712835437; 51°05′38″N 0°23′07″E		1336725	Upload Photo	Q26621202
Bedwyn Cottage Orchard Cottage	II	The Slade			10 October 1989	TQ6711935066; 51°05′26″N 0°23′06″E		1068671	Upload Photo	Q26321369
Riverside House	II	Town Hill			10 October 1989	TQ6746136080; 51°05′58″N 0°23′25″E		1068678	Riverside House More images	Q26321376
Strict Baptist Chapel and Walled Forecourt	II	Town Hill			10 October 1989	TQ6742436002; 51°05′56″N 0°23′23″E		1068714	Strict Baptist Chapel and Walled Forecourt More images	Q26321410
Wall and Railings to Front Garden of Bankside	II	Town Hill			10 October 1989	TQ6741935965; 51°05′55″N 0°23′23″E		1068732	Upload Photo	Q26321427
Sunny Bank	II	Town Hill			10 October 1989	TQ6737935907; 51°05′53″N 0°23′21″E		1068740	Upload Photo	Q26321435
The Tanhouse	II	Town Hill			10 October 1989	TQ6746636088; 51°05′59″N 0°23′25″E		1085261	The Tanhouse More images	Q26371614
Horse and Groom Public House	II	Town Hill			10 October 1989	TQ6745136071; 51°05′58″N 0°23′25″E		1085262	Horse and Groom Public House More images	Q26371619
Gates to Murlingden, Piers and Wall Attached, Immediately North of the Strict Baptist Chapel	II	Town Hill			10 October 1989	TQ6743236009; 51°05′56″N 0°23′24″E		1085263	Upload Photo	Q26371625
Walsingham, Formerly Called Hillside, With Stable Block Attached	II	Town Hill			10 October 1989	TQ6739435957; 51°05′55″N 0°23′22″E		1085264	Upload Photo	Q26371630
Bankside	II	Town Hill			10 October 1989	TQ6741235972; 51°05′55″N 0°23′23″E		1336726	Upload Photo	Q26621203
The Vicarage	II	Town Hill			10 October 1989	TQ6749836012; 51°05′56″N 0°23′27″E		1336727	Upload Photo	Q26621204

== See also ==
- Grade I listed buildings in Kent
- Grade II* listed buildings in Kent

== Sources ==
- Newman, John (2012) [1969], Kent: West and the Weald, The Buildings of England, New Haven and London: Yale University Press, ISBN 978-0-300-18509-6
