= 2025 Kent County Council election =

2025 English local election

- 1 May 2025

All 81 seats to Kent County Council 41 seats needed for a majority
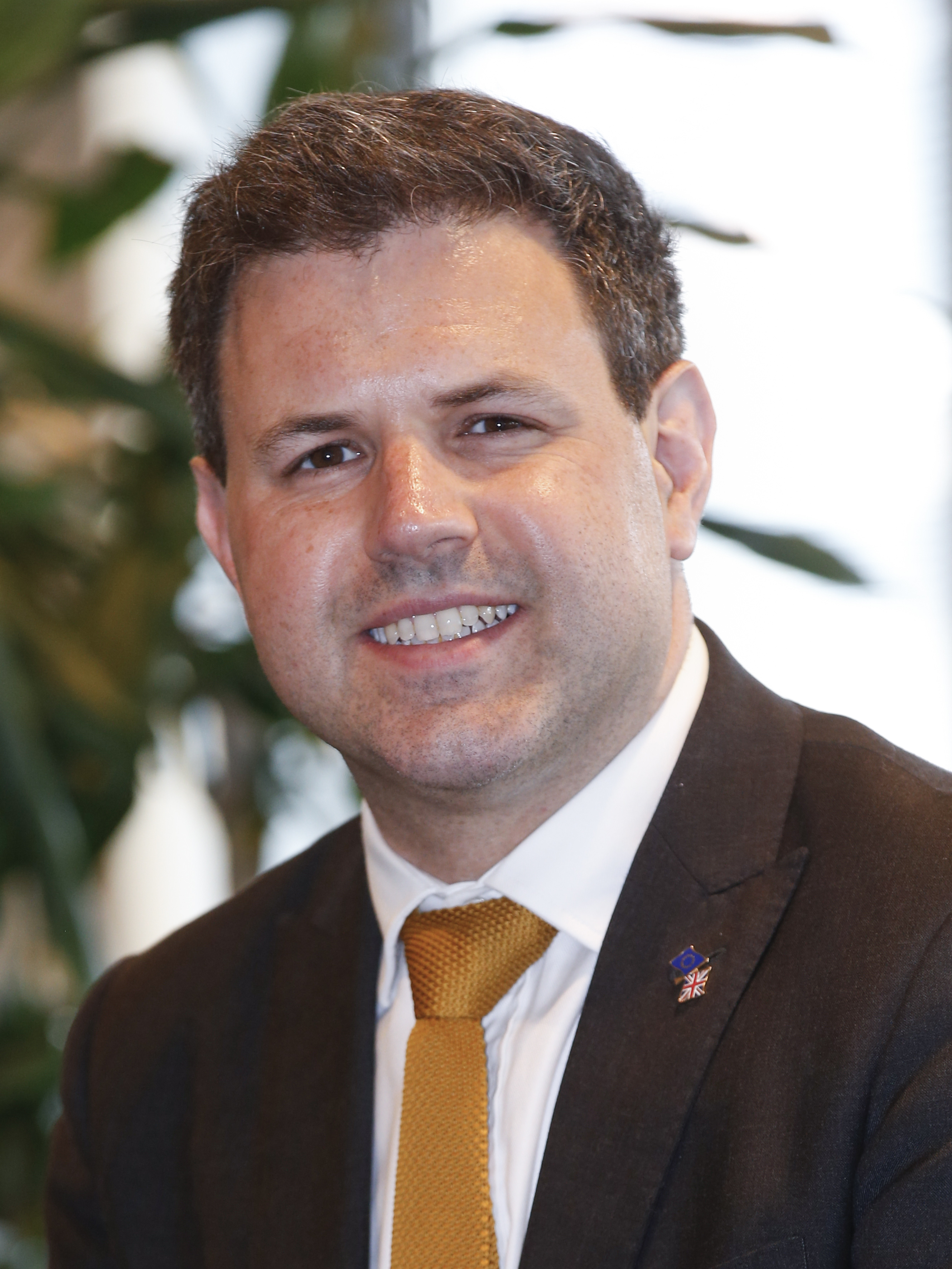
	First party	Second party	Third party
Leader	Linden Kemkaran	Antony Hook	Roger Gough (defeated)
Party	Reform	Liberal Democrats	Conservative
Leader since	22 May 2025	2 June 2021	4 October 2019
Leader's seat	Maidstone South East	Faversham	Sevenoaks North & Darent Valley
Last election	0 seats, 0.4%	6 seats, 11.1%	62 seats, 49.1%
Seats before	3	6	58
Seats won	57	12	5
Seat change	▲57	▲6	▼57
Popular vote	173,145	55,375	101,136
Percentage	37.0%	11.8%	21.6%
Swing	▲36.6 pp	▲0.7 pp	▼27.5 pp
	Fourth party	Fifth party
Leader	Rich Lehmann	Alister Brady
Party	Green	Labour
Last election	4 seats, 13.8%	7 seats, 20.5%
Seats before	5	6
Seats won	5	2
Seat change	▲1	▼5
Popular vote	64,010	61,339
Percentage	13.7%	13.1%
Swing	▼0.1 pp	▼7.4 pp
Leader before election
Roger Gough
Conservative
Leader after election
Linden Kemkaran
Reform

The 2025 Kent County Council election took place on 1 May 2025 to elect members to Kent County Council in Kent, England. Reform UK won a majority of the 81 seats, as the Conservatives lost the vast majority of their seats including most of the Cabinet. Reform won all seats in the Ashford, Dartford, Dover, Gravesham and Thanet districts.

This was on the same day as other local elections; Kent County Council had asked for the election to be postponed under the devolution programme but this was rejected, so the election was held as planned.

== Background ==
In the 2021 election, the Conservatives won 62 seats, giving them a majority and control of the council. The Labour Party were the second biggest party with 7 seats, followed by the Liberal Democrats with 6 seats and the Greens with 1 seat. Mike Baldock of the Swale Independents was elected in Swale West.

Several by-elections took place between the 2021 and 2025 elections:

Conservative Green Liberal Democrat Residents Reform UK

By-elections
Division	Date	Incumbent	Winner	Cause	Ref.
Wilmington	27 January 2022	Ann Allen	Av Sandhu	Death	
Hythe West	2 March 2023	Andy Weatherhead	Jenni Hawkins	Resignation	
Sheppey	5 May 2023	Cameron Beart	Mike Whiting	Death	
Maidstone Central	6 July 2023	Dan Daley	Chris Passmore	Death	
Swanscombe and Greenhithe	21 November 2024	Peter Harman	Thomas Mallon	Death	

In March 2024, councillor Trevor Shonk of Ramsgate left the Conservative Party to join the Thanet Independents. Later that month, councillor Mike Whiting of Sheppey was suspended from the Conservatives following a drink driving conviction and sat the rest of his term as an independent.

In the 2024 general election, the Labour Party won 10 of the Kent seats from the Conservatives (Ashford, Chatham and Aylesford, Dartford, Dover and Deal, Folkestone and Hythe, Gillingham and Rainham, Gravesham, Rochester and Strood, Sittingbourne and Sheppey and East Thanet), while retaining Canterbury. The Liberal Democrats won Tunbridge Wells from the Conservatives, who retained Faversham and Mid Kent, Maidstone and Malling, Herne Bay and Sandwich, Sevenoaks and Tonbridge while winning the new Weald of Kent seat. Overall, of the Kent seats, the Labour Party won 11, the Conservative Party won 6 and the Liberal Democrats won 1.

In October 2024, councillor Barry Lewis of Margate was deselected by the Labour Party for the upcoming election citing "concerning comments" and allegations of election betting, leading him to leave the party and serve the rest of his term as an independent. In January 2025, councillor Dirk Ross of Ashford South left the Conservative Party to sit as an independent.

== Previous council composition ==
Seats held by each party
Party	After 2021 election	Before 2025 election
Conservative	62	57
Labour	7	6
Liberal Democrats	6	6
Green	4	5
Reform	0	3
Swale Ind.	1	1
Heritage	0	1
Independent	0	2
Swanscombe & Greenhithe Residents' Association	1	0

=== Changes 2021–2025 ===
- October 2021: Ann Allen (Conservative) dies – by-election held January 2022
- January 2022: Av Sandhu (Conservative) wins by-election
- November 2022: Andy Weatherhead (Conservative) resigns – by-election held March 2023
- January 2023: Cameron Beart (Conservative) dies – by-election held May 2023
- March 2023: Jenni Hawkins (Green) gains by-election from Conservatives; Dan Daley (Liberal Democrats) dies – by-election held July 2023
- May 2023: Mike Whiting (Conservative) wins by-election
- July 2023: Chris Passmore (Liberal Democrats) wins by-election
- March 2024: Trevor Shonk (Conservative) joins Thanet Independents; Mike Whiting (Conservative) suspended by party
- August 2024: Peter Harman (Swanscombe & Greenhithe Residents' Association) dies – by-election held November 2024
- October 2024: Barry Lewis (Labour) suspended from party
- November 2024: Thomas Mallon (Reform UK) gains by-election from Residents' Association
- January 2025: Dirk Ross (Conservative) leaves party to sit as an independent
- March 2025: Trevor Shonk (Thanet Independents) and Dirk Ross (independent) join Reform UK; Becki Bruneau (Conservative) joins Heritage Party

== Opinion polling ==
=== Voting intention ===
Date(s) conducted	Pollster	Client	Sample size	Area	Con	Lab	Grn	LD	Ref	Others	Lead
1 – 10 Mar 2025	Electoral Calculus	Daily Telegraph	5,421	GB	27%	19%	8%	12%	29%	5%	2
6 May 2021	2021 local elections		–	–	49.1%	20.5%	13.8%	11.1%	0.4%	5.1%	28.6

=== Seat projections ===
Date(s) conducted	Pollster	Client	Sample size	Area	Con	Lab	Grn	LD	Ref	Others	Majority
1 – 10 Mar 2025	Electoral Calculus	Daily Telegraph	5,421	GB	25	3	2	9	41	1	1
6 May 2021	2021 local elections		–	–	62	7	4	6	0	2	43

== Summary ==
The election saw Reform UK win a majority of the seats on the council for the first time, taking 57 of the council's 81 seats. The Conservatives lost the majority they had held since 1997, and their leader Roger Gough lost his seat. Reform UK chose Linden Kemkaran, who had not been a councillor prior to the election, to be their group leader. She was formally appointed as the new leader of the council at the subsequent annual council meeting on 22 May 2025.

=== Election result ===
2025 Kent County Council election
Party	Candidates	Seats	Gains	Losses	Net gain/loss	Seats %	Votes %	Votes	+/−
Reform	81	57	57	0	▲57	70.4	37.0	173,145	+36.6
Liberal Democrats	73	12	7	1	▲6	14.8	11.8	55,375	+0.7
Conservative	81	5	0	57	▼57	6.2	21.6	101,152	–27.5
Green	75	5	2	1	▲1	6.2	13.7	64,010	–0.1
Labour	81	2	0	5	▼5	2.5	13.0	60,839	–7.5
Swale Ind.	4	0	0	1	▼1	0.0	1.1	5,083	–0.5
Independent	7	0	0	0	Steady	0.0	0.6	3,009	–1.3
Alliance	6	0	0	0	Steady	0.0	0.4	1,968	+0.1
Ashford Ind.	2	0	0	0	Steady	0.0	0.3	1,303	N/A
Residents	1	0	0	1	▼1	0.0	0.1	641	–0.4
Independents for Tunbridge Wells	5	0	0	0	Steady	0.0	0.1	599	N/A
Heritage	4	0	0	0	Steady	0.0	<0.1	223	N/A
Homeland	2	0	0	0	Steady	0.0	<0.1	114	N/A
Socialist (GB)	2	0	0	0	0	0.0	<0.1	85	±0.0
British Democrats	1	0	0	0	Steady	0.0	<0.1	70	N/A

== Division results by district ==
=== Ashford ===
Ashford district summary
Party	Seats	+/-	Votes	%	+/-
Reform UK	7	▲7	14,754	41.8	N/A
Conservative	0	▼6	7,622	21.6	–35.7
Green	0	▼1	5,231	14.8	–1.9
Labour	0	Steady	4,161	11.8	–5.7
Liberal Democrats	0	Steady	2,154	6.1	–1.5
Ashford Ind.	0	Steady	1,303	3.7	N/A
Heritage	0	Steady	75	0.2	N/A
Total	7	Steady	35,300	34.8	
Registered electors			101,316	–	

Division results

Ashford Central
Party	Candidate	Votes	%	±%
Reform	Pamela Williams	1,939	40.4	N/A
Conservative	Paul Bartlett*	993	20.7	–35.1
Labour	Diccon Spain	905	18.9	–5.1
Green	Steve Sitton	723	15.1	+1.2
Liberal Democrats	Valerie Mbali	235	4.9	–1.4
Turnout		4,795	34.7	+6.3
Registered electors		13,823		
Reform gain from Conservative				

Ashford East
Party	Candidate	Votes	%	±%
Reform	Dean Burns	1,965	41.5	N/A
Green	Steve Campkin*	1,725	36.4	–8.1
Conservative	Matthew Bridger	447	9.4	–24.9
Labour	Mathew Reena	443	9.4	–4.9
Liberal Democrats	Jacquie Stamp	153	3.2	–0.1
Turnout		4,733	34.7	+3.5
Registered electors		13,630		
Reform gain from Green				

Ashford Rural East
Party	Candidate	Votes	%	±%
Reform	Brian Collins	2,260	39.7	N/A
Green	Pat Marsh	1,381	24.2	+7.1
Conservative	Jo Gideon	1,204	21.2	–36.1
Labour	Xanthe Roe	434	7.6	–4.9
Liberal Democrats	Caroline Knight	412	7.2	–5.9
Turnout		5,691	39.1	+2.2
Registered electors		14,537		
Reform gain from Conservative		Swing	N/A	

Ashford Rural South
Party	Candidate	Votes	%	±%
Reform	Bill Barrett	2,471	47.6	N/A
Ashford Ind.	Heather Hayward	1,047	20.2	N/A
Conservative	David Robey*	859	16.5	–44.7
Labour	Simon Turp	459	8.8	–5.4
Liberal Democrats	Chris Grayling	356	6.9	–2.6
Turnout		5,192	35.0	+6.6
Registered electors		14,818		
Reform gain from Conservative				

Ashford Rural West
Party	Candidate	Votes	%	±%
Reform	Jeremy Eustace	2,195	39.1	N/A
Conservative	Clair Bell	1,784	31.8	–33.0
Green	Vanessa Hutchinson	539	9.6	–3.6
Labour	Tania Gauder	485	8.6	–4.2
Liberal Democrats	Adrian Gee-Turner	355	6.3	–1.9
Ashford Ind.	Matt Peach	256	4.6	N/A
Turnout		5,614	35.5	+2.9
Registered electors		15,811		
Reform gain from Conservative				

Ashford South
Party	Candidate	Votes	%	±%
Reform	Nick Wibberley	1,794	47.9	N/A
Labour	Brendan Chilton	902	24.1	–16.9
Conservative	Jac Wood	417	11.1	–32.6
Green	Gwen Protheroe	387	10.3	+2.1
Liberal Democrats	Garry Harrison	249	6.6	–0.6
Turnout		3,749	26.1	+2.3
Registered electors		14,360		
Reform gain from Conservative				

Tenterden
Party	Candidate	Votes	%	±%
Reform	Wayne Chapman	2,130	38.5	N/A
Conservative	Neil Bell	1,918	34.7	–34.7
Labour	David Ward	533	9.6	–0.5
Green	Guy Pullen	476	8.6	–4.6
Liberal Democrats	Alexander Coxall	394	7.1	–0.2
Heritage	Martin Chambers	75	1.4	N/A
Turnout		5,526	38.5	+2.9
Registered electors		14,337		
Reform gain from Conservative				

=== Canterbury ===
Canterbury district summary
Party	Seats	+/-	Votes	%	+/-
Reform UK	3	▲3	12,657	31.1	N/A
Labour	2	Steady	8,174	20.1	–8.7
Liberal Democrats	2	▲1	6,788	16.7	+1.0
Green	1	▲1	5,599	13.7	+2.7
Conservative	0	▼5	7,587	18.4	–25.4
Heritage	0	Steady	27	0.1	N/A
Total	8	Steady	40,748	36.7	
Registered electors			111,681	–	

Division results

Canterbury City North
Party	Candidate	Votes	%	±%
Labour	Alister Brady*	1,727	42.7	–0.6
Reform	George Spence	940	23.3	N/A
Green	Peter Campbell	561	13.9	+3.3
Liberal Democrats	Maggs Mackechnie	428	10.6	–11.5
Conservative	Arjan Taylor	385	9.5	–14.4
Majority		787	19.4	±0.0
Turnout		4,052	32.8	–4.9
Registered electors		12,343		
Labour hold				

Canterbury City South
Party	Candidate	Votes	%	±%
Labour	Connie Nolan	1,776	39.0	–2.0
Reform	Kieran Mishchuk	942	20.7	N/A
Green	Stephen Peckham	722	15.9	+5.6
Conservative	Daniel Smythe	598	13.1	–13.8
Liberal Democrats	Eleo Berceanu	514	11.3	–10.4
Majority		834	18.3	+4.2
Turnout		4,563	31.5	–5.4
Registered electors		14,506		
Labour hold				

Canterbury North
Party	Candidate	Votes	%	±%
Liberal Democrats	Alex Ricketts	1,630	33.5	+20.2
Reform	Dirk Ross	1,466	30.1	N/A
Conservative	Hilary Scott	983	20.2	–33.0
Labour	Owen Vanston-Hallam	433	8.9	–13.3
Green	Michael Bax	352	7.2	–4.1
Majority		164	3.4	N/A
Turnout		4,869	42.3	+3.4
Registered electors		11,518		
Liberal Democrats gain from Conservative				

Canterbury South
Party	Candidate	Votes	%	±%
Liberal Democrats	Mike Sole*	3,017	56.3	+10.7
Reform	Colin Spooner	1,232	23.0	N/A
Conservative	John Hippisley	409	7.6	–28.6
Labour	Yasmin Dallos-Foreman	372	6.9	–10.9
Green	Henry Stanton	331	6.2	N/A
Majority		1,785	33.3	+24.2
Turnout		5,370	41.6	–1.7
Registered electors		12,907		
Liberal Democrats hold				

Herne Bay East
Party	Candidate	Votes	%	±%
Reform	Paul Chamberlain	1,935	37.5	N/A
Conservative	Dan Watkins*	1,597	30.9	–23.3
Labour	Lawrence Coomber	969	18.8	–2.7
Green	Nicole David	382	7.4	–7.2
Liberal Democrats	Yvonne Hawkins	280	5.4	–0.3
Majority		338	6.6	N/A
Turnout		5,177	36.4	+6.0
Registered electors		14,211		
Reform gain from Conservative				

Herne Village & Sturry
Party	Candidate	Votes	%	±%
Reform	Mark Mulvihill	2,239	41.6	N/A
Conservative	Louise Harvey-Quirke	1,568	29.1	–31.2
Labour	Dave Wilson	607	11.3	–9.7
Green	Jessie Millner	486	9.0	–4.3
Liberal Democrats	Derek Maslin	482	9.0	+3.6
Majority		671	12.5	N/A
Turnout		5,394	31.8	+1.4
Registered electors		16,944		
Reform gain from Conservative				

Whitstable East & Herne Bay West
Party	Candidate	Votes	%	±%
Reform	Adrian Kibble	2,062	37.9	N/A
Conservative	Neil Baker*	1,502	27.6	–26.3
Labour	Andy Davidson	868	16.0	–7.2
Green	Andrew Harvey	668	12.3	–3.7
Liberal Democrats	Nick Parry	292	5.4	–1.4
Independent	Joshua O'Donnell	49	0.9	N/A
Majority		560	10.3	N/A
Turnout		5,451	37.6	+1.7
Registered electors		14,507		
Reform gain from Conservative				

Whitstable West
Party	Candidate	Votes	%	±%
Green	Stuart Heaver	2,097	34.5	+21.5
Reform	Babychan Thomas	1,841	30.3	N/A
Labour	Christopher Cornell	1,422	23.4	–16.2
Conservative	Grace Paget	545	9.0	–33.9
Liberal Democrats	Christopher Palmer	145	2.4	–0.7
Heritage	Gary Blanford	27	0.4	N/A
Majority		256	4.2	N/A
Turnout		6,083	41.3	+2.4
Registered electors		14,745		
Green gain from Conservative				

=== Dartford ===
Party	Seats	+/-	Votes	%	+/-
Reform UK	6	▲6	9,997	40.9	+38.9
Conservative	0	▼4	7,370	30.2	–22.7
Labour	0	▼1	4,424	18.1	–12.7
Green	0	Steady	1,819	7.4	+2.4
Residents	0	▼1	641	2.6	–6.7
Liberal Democrats	0	Steady	157	0.6	+0.6
Heritage	0	Steady	31	0.1	+0.1

Dartford East
Party	Candidate	Votes	%	±%
Reform	Ryan Waters	1,591	44.9	New
Conservative	Danny Nicklen	963	27.2	▼22.5
Labour	Darren Povey	682	19.2	▼10
Green	Jullian Hood	310	8.7	New
Majority		628	17.7	
Reform gain from Conservative		Swing	▲22.4	

Dartford North East
Party	Candidate	Votes	%	±%
Reform	Ben Fryer	1,514	36.1	▲33.6
Labour	Kelly Grehan	1,186	28.3	▼15.2
Conservative	Clement Quaqumey	939	22.4	▼18.6
Green	Laura Edie	552	13.2	▲0.2
Majority		328	7.8	
Reform gain from Labour		Swing	▲24.4	

Dartford Rural
Party	Candidate	Votes	%	±%
Reform	Micheal Brown	2,086	45.7	▲42.6
Conservative	Jeremy Kite	1,786	39.2	▼34.9
Labour	Catherine Stafford	442	9.7	▼6.5
Green	Alastair Humphreys	215	4.7	▼1.9
Heritage	Russell Joyce	31	0.7	New
Majority		300	6.5	
Reform gain from Conservative		Swing	▲38.8	

Dartford West
Party	Candidate	Votes	%	±%
Reform	Beverley Fordham	1,615	37.2	▲33.4
Conservative	Richard Wells	1,457	33.6	▼26.9
Labour	Bachchu Kaini	875	20.2	▼15.5
Green	Lewis Glynn	394	9.1	New
Majority		158	3.6	
Reform gain from Conservative		Swing	▲30.2	

Swanscombe & Greenhithe
Party	Candidate	Votes	%	±%
Reform	Thomas Mallon	1,245	35.9	▲34.3
Labour	Claire Pearce	747	21.5	▼10.6
Conservative	Tan Talukder	678	19.5	▼6.4
Residents	Dawn Johnston	641	18.5	▼21.9
Green	Karen Lynch	158	4.6	New
Majority		498	14.4	
Reform gain from Residents		Swing	▲22.5	

Wilmington
Party	Candidate	Votes	%	±%
Reform	Alan Cecil	1,946	44.9	New
Conservative	Avtar Sandhu	1,547	35.7	▼36.7
Labour	Alina Vaduva	492	11.4	▼8.6
Green	Garry Turner	190	4.4	▼3.2
Liberal Democrats	Diane Gough	157	3.6	New
Majority		399	9.2	
Reform gain from Conservative		Swing		

=== Dover ===
Dover district summary
Party	Seats	+/-	Votes	%	+/-
Reform UK	7	▲7	19,697	42.5	N/A
Labour	0	Steady	9,285	20.0	–9.1
Conservative	0	▼7	8,835	19.1	–31.5
Green	0	Steady	4,340	9.4	–1.0
Liberal Democrats	0	Steady	3,686	8.0	+2.9
Independent	0	Steady	466	1.0	–3.0
Heritage	0	Steady	33	0.1	N/A
Total	7	Steady	46,342	35.3	
Registered electors			89,273	–	

Division results

Deal & Walmer (2 seats)
Party	Candidate	Votes	%	±%
Reform	Chris Burwash	3,317	35.9	N/A
Reform	Martin Paul	3,143	34.0	N/A
Labour	Clair Hawkins	2,786	30.1	–4.9
Green	Christine Oliver	1,895	20.5	+0.4
Conservative	Trevor Bond*	1,845	19.9	–29.7
Labour	Michael Nee	1,781	19.3	–10.8
Conservative	Dan Friend	1,480	16.0	–30.2
Liberal Democrats	John Gosling	873	9.4	+3.6
Liberal Democrats	Howard Evans	507	5.5	+0.8
Turnout		9,249	38.5	+3.5
Registered electors		24,042		
Reform gain from Conservative				
Reform gain from Conservative				

Dover North
Party	Candidate	Votes	%	±%
Reform	Bridget Porter	2,041	43.6	N/A
Conservative	Steve Manion*	987	21.1	–30.7
Labour Co-op	Jan Gray	721	15.4	–10.7
Green	Sarah Waite-Gleave	583	12.5	–5.6
Liberal Democrats	Bob Hope	312	6.7	+2.6
Heritage	Sylvia Laidlow-Petersen	33	0.7	N/A
Majority		1,054	22.5	N/A
Turnout		4,683	36.6	+2.9
Registered electors		12,803		
Reform gain from Conservative				

Dover Town (2 seats)
Party	Candidate	Votes	%	±%
Reform	James Defriend	3,650	50.6	N/A
Reform	Albert Thorp	3,322	46.0	N/A
Labour	Bekah Dawes	1,403	19.4	–14.2
Labour	Gordon Cowan	1,348	18.7	–12.0
Green	Liz Hayes	900	12.5	–3.6
Conservative	Oliver Richardson*	823	11.4	–32.3
Conservative	Peter Jull	798	11.1	–28.6
Liberal Democrats	Ryan Grimes	523	7.2	+0.8
Liberal Democrats	Adrian Walker-Smith	481	6.7	+1.5
Independent	Nigel Collor*	466	6.5	N/A
Turnout		7,219	29.0	+4.4
Registered electors		24,886		
Reform gain from Conservative				
Reform gain from Conservative				

Dover West
Party	Candidate	Votes	%	±%
Reform	Paul King	2,482	48.4	N/A
Conservative	David Beaney*	1,176	23.0	–39.0
Labour	Janet Kember	685	13.4	–10.0
Green	Nick Shread	443	8.6	–1.5
Liberal Democrats	Penelope James	338	6.6	+2.1
Majority		1,306	25.4	N/A
Turnout		5,133	37.9	+4.3
Registered electors		13,534		
Reform gain from Conservative				

Sandwich
Party	Candidate	Votes	%	±%
Reform	Peter Evans	1,742	33.5	N/A
Conservative	Sue Chandler*	1,726	33.2	–26.5
Liberal Democrats	Martyn Pennington	652	12.5	+7.8
Labour	Amy Price	561	10.8	–5.1
Green	Pete Findley	519	10.0	–0.8
Majority		16	0.3	N/A
Turnout		5,209	37.2	+2.2
Registered electors		14,008		
Reform gain from Conservative				

=== Folkestone and Hythe ===
Folkeston & Hythe district summary
Party	Seats	+/-	Votes	%	+/-
Reform UK	5	▲5	14,293	43.5	+42.4
Liberal Democrats	1	▲1	3,586	10.9	–0.1
Green	0	Steady	5,545	16.9	+2.6
Conservative	0	▼5	5,306	16.1	–31.0
Labour	0	▼1	3,870	11.8	–8.1
Independent	0	Steady	136	0.4	–1.4
Socialist (GB)	0	Steady	85	0.3	–0.2
Homeland	0	Steady	50	0.2	N/A
Total	6	Steady	32,871	38.8	
Registered electors			84,909	–	

Division results

Cheriton, Sandgate & Hythe East
Party	Candidate	Votes	%	±%
Liberal Democrats	Tim Prater	2,051	34.0	–7.2
Reform	Gary Burton	1,987	32.9	N/A
Conservative	Rory Love*	973	16.1	–25.5
Green	Momtaz Khanom	595	9.9	N/A
Labour	Alex Davies	428	7.1	–8.3
Majority		64	1.1	N/A
Turnout		6,046	39.9	+5.3
Registered electors		15,165		
Liberal Democrats gain from Conservative				

Elham Valley
Party	Candidate	Votes	%	±%
Reform	Christopher Hespe	2,522	43.6	N/A
Green	Jim Martin	1,439	24.9	–12.1
Conservative	Sarah Richardson	1,120	19.3	–30.8
Liberal Democrats	Emily Newing	376	6.5	N/A
Labour	Mason Collen	333	5.8	–1.0
Majority		1,083	18.7	N/A
Turnout		5,804	39.5	+14.0
Registered electors		14,681		
Reform gain from Conservative				

Folkestone East
Party	Candidate	Votes	%	±%
Reform	Mary Lawes	1,712	41.4	N/A
Labour	Jackie Meade*	1,076	26.0	–12.2
Conservative	Kieran Leigh	513	12.4	–20.3
Green	Marianne Brett	509	12.3	N/A
Liberal Democrats	Tom McNeice	233	5.6	–4.8
Homeland	Steve Laws	50	1.2	N/A
Socialist (GB)	Max Hess	38	0.9	–1.7
Majority		636	15.4	N/A
Turnout		4,138	31.7	+6.0
Registered electors		13,060		
Reform gain from Labour				

Folkestone West
Party	Candidate	Votes	%	±%
Reform	John Baker	1,748	33.6	N/A
Labour	Adrian Lockwood	1,152	22.1	–14.6
Green	Rebecca Shoob	996	19.1	N/A
Conservative	Dylan Jeffrey*	852	16.4	–26.7
Liberal Democrats	Matthew Horrox	414	7.9	–3.2
Socialist (GB)	Andy Thomas	47	0.9	–0.2
Majority		596	11.5	N/A
Turnout		5,222	37.6	+4.4
Registered electors		13,878		
Reform gain from Conservative				

Hythe West
Party	Candidate	Votes	%	±%
Reform	Peter Osborne	2,421	43.5	N/A
Green	Roy Smith	1,563	28.1	–9.7
Conservative	Sean McKirdy	870	15.6	–33.5
Labour	Christian Perry	326	5.9	–3.6
Liberal Democrats	John Stokes	254	4.6	N/A
Independent	Andy Weatherhead	136	2.4	N/A
Majority		858	15.4	N/A
Turnout		5,577	42.9	+3.0
Registered electors		13,000		
Reform gain from Green				

Romney Marsh
Party	Candidate	Votes	%	±%
Reform	David Wimble	3,903	63.6	+60.0
Conservative	Tony Hills*	978	15.9	–46.3
Labour Co-op	Tony Cooper	555	9.0	–7.1
Green	Malcolm Watkinson	443	7.2	–4.8
Liberal Democrats	Gary Fuller	258	4.2	N/A
Majority		2,925	47.7	N/A
Turnout		6,153	40.7	+7.4
Registered electors		15,125		
Reform gain from Conservative		Swing	▲53.2	

=== Gravesham ===
Party	Seats	+/-	Votes	%	+/-
Reform UK	5	▲5	16,141	44.1	+44.1
Labour	0	▼1	8,219	22.43	–15.7
Conservative	0	▼4	8,193	22.36	–28.8
Green	0	Steady	3,401	9.3	+4.1
Liberal Democrats	0	Steady	683	1.9	–3.6

Gravesend East (2 seats)
Party	Candidate	Votes	%	±%
Reform	Georgia Foster	3,721	47.3	New
Reform	Garry Sturley	3,518	44.7	New
Conservative	Iris Smith	1,729	22.0	▼31.8
Labour	Deborah Croxton	1,692	21.5	▼20.5
Labour	John Burden	1,661	21.1	▼16.6
Conservative	Deepak Panda	1,629	20.7	▼27.4
Green	Rebecca Hopkins	1,047	13.3	▲4.6
Green	Stephen Porter	751	9.5	New
Turnout		15,748	27	
Registered electors		30,619		
Reform gain from Conservative				
Reform gain from Conservative				

Gravesend Rural
Party	Candidate	Votes	%	±%
Reform	Diane Morton	2,591	44.6	New
Conservative	Jordan Meade*	1,993	34.3	▼32.8
Labour	Harriet Howes	546	9.4	▼5.4
Liberal Democrats	John Death	367	6.3	▼5.0
Green	Diana Scott	309	5.3	▼1.5
Majority		598	10.3	
Turnout		5,815	38	
Registered electors		15,225		
Reform gain from Conservative		Swing	▲39.5	

Northfleet & Gravesend West (2 seats)
Party	Candidate	Votes	%	±%
Reform	Matthew Fraser Moat	3,237	42.9	New
Reform	Sharon Roots	3,074	40.8	New
Labour	Karina O'Malley	2,195	29.1	▼16.0
Labour	Narinderjit Thandi	2,125	28.2	▼16.1
Conservative	Gary Harding	1,512	20.0	▼24.3
Conservative	Frank Wardle	1,330	17.6	▼29.4
Green	James Eagle	716	9.5	▼1.4
Green	Martin Wilson	578	7.7	New
Liberal Democrats	Ukonu Obasi	316	4.2	▼4.2
Turnout		7,937	26	
Registered electors		30,888		
Reform gain from Conservative				
Reform gain from Labour				

=== Maidstone ===
Maidstone district summary
Party	Seats	+/-	Votes	%	+/-
Reform UK	7	▲7	18,029	34.6	+34.1
Liberal Democrats	1	▼1	9,552	18.4	–1.7
Green	1	▲1	8,753	16.8	+4.2
Conservative	0	▼7	12,030	23.1	–25.0
Labour	0	Steady	3,416	6.6	–8.4
British Democrats	0	Steady	70	0.1	N/A
Independent	0	Steady	70	0.1	–3.7
Homeland	0	Steady	64	0.1	N/A
Heritage	0	Steady	57	0.1	N/A
Total	9	Steady	52,041	32.1	
Registered electors			134,324	–	

Division results

Maidstone Central (2 seats)
Party	Candidate	Votes	%	±%
Reform	Oliver Bradshaw	2,477	25.8	N/A
Green	Stuart Jeffrey	2,373	24.7	+11.9
Reform	Peter Jarvis	2,372	24.7	N/A
Conservative	Stan Forecast	2,299	24.0	–5.8
Green	Rachel Rodwell	2,151	22.4	+6.2
Conservative	Tom Cannon*	2,034	21.2	–19.3
Liberal Democrats	Chris Passmore*	2,026	21.1	–12.4
Liberal Democrats	Tony Harwood	1,782	18.6	–7.1
Labour	Derek Swan	612	6.4	–14.7
Labour	Joanna Wilkinson	524	5.5	–14.8
Turnout		9,596	31.5	
Registered electors		30,472		
Reform gain from Conservative				
Green gain from Liberal Democrats				

Maidstone North East
Party	Candidate	Votes	%	±%
Liberal Democrats	Geoffrey Samme	1,637	35.5	–3.7
Reform	Mark Johnson	1,554	33.7	N/A
Conservative	Michelle Hastie	720	15.6	–21.1
Green	Allison Sweetman	384	8.3	–3.0
Labour	Dan Wilkinson	320	6.9	–5.9
Majority		83	1.8	–0.7
Turnout		4,628	29.8	–3.0
Registered electors		15,532		
Liberal Democrats hold				

Maidstone Rural East
Party	Candidate	Votes	%	±%
Reform	Sarah Emberson	2,709	45.8	N/A
Conservative	Shelina Prendergast*	1,700	28.8	–36.5
Green	Callum Sweetman	719	12.2	–4.8
Labour	Carter Powell	375	6.3	–2.4
Liberal Democrats	Sam Burrows	345	5.8	+0.2
Homeland	Simon Bennett	64	1.1	N/A
Majority		1,009	17.0	N/A
Turnout		6,010	36.8	–3.2
Registered electors		16,347		
Reform gain from Conservative				

Maidstone Rural North
Party	Candidate	Votes	%	±%
Reform	Spencer Dixon	1,697	35.3	N/A
Conservative	Paul Carter*	1,233	25.6	–20.1
Green	Stephen Thompson	1,092	22.7	+11.5
Liberal Democrats	Clive English	471	9.8	+2.2
Labour	Ryan Slaughter	261	5.4	–8.7
Heritage	Sean Turner	57	1.2	N/A
Majority		464	9.7	N/A
Turnout		4,817	33.8	–2.8
Registered electors		14,259		
Reform gain from Conservative				

Maidstone Rural South
Party	Candidate	Votes	%	±%
Reform	Brian Black	1,874	35.9	+34.0
Conservative	Lottie Parfitt*	1,818	34.9	–10.8
Green	Derek Eagle	600	11.5	–0.6
Labour	Rory Silkin	493	9.5	+0.6
Liberal Democrats	Dinesh Khadka	429	8.2	N/A
Majority		56	1.0	N/A
Turnout		5,224	33.3	–5.9
Registered electors		15,703		
Reform gain from Conservative		Swing	▲22.4	

Maidstone Rural West
Party	Candidate	Votes	%	±%
Reform	Robert Ford	1,854	37.1	N/A
Conservative	Simon Webb*	1,230	24.6	–35.4
Green	Julie Read	974	19.5	+4.7
Liberal Democrats	Simon Wales	772	15.4	+0.5
Labour	Oliver Worsfield	169	3.4	–6.8
Majority		624	12.5	N/A
Turnout		5,009	36.1	–3.1
Registered electors		13,869		
Reform gain from Conservative				

Maidstone South East
Party	Candidate	Votes	%	±%
Reform	Linden Kemkaran	1,689	51.3	N/A
Conservative	Richard Chesson	546	16.6	–48.2
Liberal Democrats	David Naghi	361	11.0	–0.4
Labour	Tim Oladimeji	347	10.5	–13.3
Green	Caroline Richer	279	8.5	N/A
British Democrats	Lawrence Rustem	70	2.1	N/A
Majority		1,143	34.7	N/A
Turnout		3,296	23.2	–0.4
Registered electors		14,202		
Reform gain from Conservative				

Maidstone South
Party	Candidate	Votes	%	±%
Reform	Paul Thomas	1,803	39.6	N/A
Liberal Democrats	Brian Clark	1,729	38.0	+3.0
Conservative	Darcy Rotherham	450	9.9	–32.5
Labour	Maureen Cleator	315	6.9	–4.1
Green	Benjamin Potts	181	4.0	–3.0
Independent	Gary Butler	70	1.5	–1.0
Majority		74	1.6	N/A
Turnout		4,552	32.7	+2.5
Registered electors		13,940		
Reform gain from Conservative				

=== Sevenoaks ===
Sevenoaks district summary
Party	Seats	+/-	Votes	%	+/-
Reform UK	4	▲4	9,889	32.4	N/A
Conservative	1	▼4	9,875	32.3	–24.0
Liberal Democrats	1	Steady	6,246	20.4	+3.0
Green	0	Steady	2,815	9.2	–4.6
Labour	0	Steady	1,721	5.6	–4.3
Total	6	Steady	30,546	34.4	
Registered electors			90,433	–	

Division results

Sevenoaks North & Darent Valley
Party	Candidate	Votes	%	±%
Reform	Marc Logen	2,133	36.6	N/A
Conservative	Roger Gough*	1,945	33.4	–30.9
Liberal Democrats	Adam Durbaba	1,103	18.9	+7.5
Green	Michael Barker	387	6.6	–6.1
Labour	Ben Davies	263	4.5	–7.0
Majority		188	3.2	N/A
Turnout		5,836	36.2	+2.2
Registered electors		16,120		
Reform gain from Conservative				

Sevenoaks Rural North East
Party	Candidate	Votes	%	±%
Reform	Maxine Fothergill	2,259	41.6	N/A
Conservative	Penny Cole	1,699	31.3	–27.7
Green	Laura Manston	1,080	19.9	–13.5
Labour	Claire Fox	241	4.4	–3.2
Liberal Democrats	Lise Michaelides	146	2.7	N/A
Majority		560	10.3	N/A
Turnout		5,432	38.4	+4.1
Registered electors		14,147		
Reform gain from Conservative				

Sevenoaks Rural South
Party	Candidate	Votes	%	±%
Reform	Robert Mayall	1,172	30.4	N/A
Conservative	Ian Butcher	1,058	27.4	–34.0
Green	Juliet Townsend	784	20.3	+6.5
Labour	Matt Oliver	774	18.0	–4.8
Liberal Democrats	Helen Hobhouse	570	14.8	+1.9
Majority		114	3.0	N/A
Turnout		4,367	31.6	–2.6
Registered electors		13,812		
Reform gain from Conservative				

Sevenoaks Town
Party	Candidate	Votes	%	±%
Liberal Democrats	Richard Streatfeild*	2,510	45.8	+0.5
Conservative	James London	1,662	30.3	–12.2
Reform	Luke Knott	929	16.9	N/A
Green	Paul Wharton	199	3.6	–4.1
Labour Co-op	Theo Michael	186	3.4	–1.1
Majority		848	15.5	+12.7
Turnout		5,490	36.2	–5.7
Registered electors		15,178		
Liberal Democrats hold		Swing	▲6.4	

Sevenoaks West
Party	Candidate	Votes	%	±%
Conservative	Nigel Williams	1,983	34.5	–24.1
Liberal Democrats	Sandra Robinson	1,659	28.9	+8.3
Reform	Steve Bassi	1,616	28.1	N/A
Labour Co-op	Neil Proudfoot	274	4.8	–4.2
Green	Robert Royston	209	3.6	–8.3
Majority		324	5.6	–32.4
Turnout		5,753	37.1	+1.3
Registered electors		15,495		
Conservative hold		Swing	▼16.2	

Swanley
Party	Candidate	Votes	%	±%
Reform	Dean Truder	1,780	42.3	N/A
Conservative	Perry Cole*	1,528	36.3	–18.8
Labour Co-op	Jackie Griffiths	483	11.5	–5.7
Liberal Democrats	Tristan Ward	258	6.1	+1.7
Green	Mike Young	156	3.7	–0.9
Majority		252	6.0	N/A
Turnout		4,213	26.9	–1.5
Registered electors		15,681		
Reform gain from Conservative				

=== Swale ===
Swale district summary
Party	Seats	+/-	Votes	%	+/-
Reform UK	5	▲5	19,210	44.2	+43.6
Liberal Democrats	1	Steady	4,160	9.6	+0.3
Green	1	Steady	3,621	8.3	–4.2
Conservative	0	▼4	5,737	13.2	–33.2
Swale Ind.	0	▼1	5,083	11.7	–6.2
Labour	0	Steady	4,069	9.4	–2.8
Independent	0	Steady	1,557	3.6	+2.5
Total	7	Steady	43,437	31.4	
Registered electors			112,247	–	

Division results

Faversham
Party	Candidate	Votes	%	±%
Liberal Democrats	Antony Hook*	2,750	43.6	–1.0
Reform	Jess Valentine	1,620	25.7	N/A
Labour Co-op	Rob Crayford	707	11.2	–6.5
Green	Carol Goatham	691	11.0	N/A
Conservative	Ben Fisher	541	8.6	–22.0
Majority		1,130	17.9	+3.9
Turnout		6,326	37.6	–2.7
Registered electors		16,830		
Liberal Democrats hold				

Sheppey (2 seats)
Party	Candidate	Votes	%	±%
Reform	Maxwell Harrison	5,060	53.7	+50.0
Reform	Isabella Kemp	4,605	48.8	N/A
Swale Ind.	Elliott Jayes	1,625	17.2	–7.7
Independent	Mike Whiting	1,557	16.5	N/A
Conservative	Andy Booth*	1,169	12.4	–39.0
Conservative	Mark Tucker	1,039	11.0	–58.4
Labour	Dolley Wooster	851	9.0	–13.6
Labour	Hayden Brawn	693	7.3	N/A
Green	Sam Banks	513	5.4	–5.0
Liberal Democrats	Linda Brinklow	391	4.1	–0.9
Liberal Democrats	Frances Stennings	160	1.7	–1.3
Turnout		9,431	29.5	+5.6
Registered electors		31,990		
Reform gain from Conservative				
Reform gain from Conservative				

Sittingbourne North
Party	Candidate	Votes	%	±%
Reform	Chris Palmer	1,885	48.6	N/A
Labour	Ashley Wise	758	19.6	–5.9
Conservative	Michael Dendor*	485	12.5	–29.8
Swale Ind.	Derek Carnell	357	9.2	–13.5
Green	Stephen Davey	236	6.1	+0.7
Liberal Democrats	Mary Zeng	155	4.0	–0.1
Majority		1,127	29.0	N/A
Turnout		3,887	22.7	–1.8
Registered electors		17,108		
Reform gain from Conservative				

Sittingbourne South
Party	Candidate	Votes	%	±%
Reform	Paul Webb	1,735	38.2	N/A
Swale Ind.	Tom Lee	1,281	28.2	–4.1
Conservative	Thomas Leeming	620	13.7	–26.5
Labour	Karen Watson	495	10.9	–5.6
Green	Lisa Eades	205	4.5	–2.1
Liberal Democrats	Alexander Stennings	201	4.4	–0.1
Majority		454	10.0	N/A
Turnout		4,545	32.2	–0.5
Registered electors		14,112		
Reform gain from Conservative				

Swale East
Party	Candidate	Votes	%	±%
Green	Rich Lehmann*	1,976	35.6	–16.1
Reform	Ryan Kidby	1,755	31.6	N/A
Conservative	Julien Speed	1,318	23.7	–17.5
Liberal Democrats	Charles Gibson	269	4.8	N/A
Labour	Frances Rehal	236	4.2	–2.9
Majority		221	4.0	–6.5
Turnout		5,564	38.1	–4.4
Registered electors		14,599		
Green hold				

Swale West
Party	Candidate	Votes	%	±%
Reform	Richard Palmer	2,550	46.4	N/A
Swale Ind.	Mike Baldock*	1,820	33.1	–22.9
Conservative	James Hogben	565	10.3	–33.7
Labour	Chrystable Appiah	329	6.0	N/A
Liberal Democrats	Marc Wilson	234	4.3	N/A
Majority		730	13.3	N/A
Turnout		5,506	31.3	–0.6
Registered electors		17,608		
Reform gain from Swale Ind.				

=== Thanet ===
Thanet district summary
Party	Seats	+/-	Votes	%	+/-
Reform UK	7	▲7	19,932	39.7	+39.2
Conservative	0	▼5	9,375	18.7	–26.8
Green	0	Steady	8,824	17.6	–1.9
Labour	0	▼2	8,802	17.6	–7.0
Liberal Democrats	0	Steady	2,447	4.9	+0.9
Independent	0	Steady	772	1.5	±0.0
Total	7	Steady	50,152	31.5	
Registered electors			104,443	–	

Division results

Birchington & Rural (2 seats)
Party	Candidate	Votes	%	±%
Reform	Luke Evans	3,766	42.1	+39.1
Reform	Amelia Randall	3,245	36.3	N/A
Conservative	Phil Fellows	2,595	29.0	–26.4
Conservative	Derek Crow-Brown*	2,521	28.2	–24.9
Green	Will Jarman	1,035	11.6	–8.9
Labour	Bryan Harrod	1,016	11.4	–10.8
Labour	Laurie Hudson	966	10.8	N/A
Green	Fi O'Connor	841	9.4	–4.0
Liberal Democrats	Deborah Holmes	609	6.8	+0.2
Liberal Democrats	Rachel Mummery	512	5.7	+0.8
Turnout		8,949	32.1	+2.2
Registered electors		27,913		
Reform gain from Conservative				
Reform gain from Conservative				

Broadstairs
Party	Candidate	Votes	%	±%
Reform	John Finch	1,947	33.2	N/A
Green	Mike Garner	1,462	24.9	+7.9
Labour	Joanne Bright	1,196	20.4	–8.7
Conservative	Charlie Leys	1,058	18.1	–32.5
Liberal Democrats	Claire Goldfinch	198	3.4	+0.1
Majority		485	8.3	N/A
Turnout		5,867	39.9	+3.0
Registered electors		14,687		
Reform gain from Conservative				

Cliftonville
Party	Candidate	Votes	%	±%
Reform	Daniel Taylor	1,922	40.2	N/A
Labour	Peter Mousley	1,055	22.0	–4.4
Conservative	Lesley Game*	942	19.7	–37.7
Green	Steve Roberts	576	12.0	+1.6
Liberal Democrats	Mo Shafaei	147	3.1	–0.3
Independent	Ian Driver	143	3.0	N/A
Majority		867	18.2	N/A
Turnout		4,788	33.4	+3.0
Rejected ballots		3	0.1	
Registered electors		14,321		
Reform gain from Conservative				

Margate
Party	Candidate	Votes	%	±%
Reform	Jamie Henderson	1,332	36.7	N/A
Labour	Jack Packman	1,099	30.3	–11.8
Independent	Barry Lewis*	629	17.3	N/A
Conservative	Marc Rattigan	333	9.2	–30.3
Liberal Democrats	Matthew Brown	236	6.5	+1.1
Majority		233	6.4	N/A
Turnout		3,647	23.9	+1.8
Registered electors		15,243		
Reform gain from Labour				

Ramsgate (2 seats)
Party	Candidate	Votes	%	±%
Reform	Trevor Shonk*	3,939	40.9	N/A
Reform	Terry Mole	3,781	39.3	N/A
Green	Becky Wing	2,634	27.4	–3.7
Green	Thea Barrett	2,276	23.6	+2.4
Labour	Claire Hedderman	1,807	18.8	–15.8
Labour	Helen Whitehead	1,663	17.3	–10.1
Conservative	John Davis	1,041	10.8	–24.1
Conservative	Barry Manners	885	9.2	–21.3
Liberal Democrats	Jeremy de Rose	374	3.9	+1.0
Liberal Democrats	Harry Goldfinch	371	3.9	+1.5
Turnout		9,626	29.8	+2.0
Registered electors		32,279		
Reform gain from Conservative				
Reform gain from Labour				

=== Tonbridge and Malling ===
Tonbridge & Malling district summary
Party	Seats	+/-	Votes	%	+/-
Conservative	3	▼1	12,493	27.9	–21.4
Green	2	Steady	11,936	26.6	–2.1
Reform UK	1	▲1	11,678	26.1	N/A
Liberal Democrats	1	Steady	6,047	13.5	+2.8
Labour	0	Steady	2,649	5.9	–2.4
Independent	0	Steady	8	<0.1	N/A
Total	7	Steady	44,811	44.6	
Registered electors			100,550	–	

Division results

Malling Central
Party	Candidate	Votes	%	±%
Liberal Democrats	Trudy Dean*	2,398	55.8	–11.9
Reform	Kevin Brady	1,284	29.9	N/A
Conservative	Luke Chapman	356	8.3	–18.5
Labour	Sarah Palmer	133	3.1	–2.4
Green	Isla Arnold	115	2.7	N/A
Independent	Afua Akoto	8	0.2	N/A
Majority		1,114	25.9	–15.0
Turnout		4,304	32.5	–1.9
Registered electors		13,246		
Liberal Democrats hold				

Malling North
Party	Candidate	Votes	%	±%
Reform	Sian Dodger	1,755	36.6	N/A
Conservative	Robin Betts	1,332	27.8	–35.9
Labour	Paul Hickmott	808	16.8	–3.4
Liberal Democrats	Kate O'Shea	712	14.8	–1.2
Green	Matt Broadley	192	4.0	N/A
Majority		423	8.8	N/A
Turnout		4,815	32.0	+3.0
Registered electors		15,054		
Reform gain from Conservative				

Malling North East
Party	Candidate	Votes	%	±%
Conservative	Andrew Kennedy*	2,290	44.2	–28.4
Reform	Stephen Dean	1,684	32.5	N/A
Liberal Democrats	James Cox	477	9.2	+0.4
Labour	Angus Bennison	411	7.9	–3.3
Green	Thomas Shelley	323	6.2	–1.2
Majority		606	11.7	–49.7
Turnout		5,196	31.3	–2.4
Registered electors		16,586		
Conservative hold				

Malling Rural East
Party	Candidate	Votes	%	±%
Conservative	Sarah Hudson*	2,140	42.6	–22.3
Reform	Helen Brown	1,538	30.6	N/A
Green	Daid Nicholls	732	14.6	+0.2
Liberal Democrats	Timothy Bishop	374	7.4	+0.2
Labour	Jack Tyrrell	244	4.9	–2.6
Majority		602	12.0	–38.5
Turnout		5,033	33.0	–2.3
Registered electors		15,249		
Conservative hold				

Malling West
Party	Candidate	Votes	%	±%
Conservative	Harry Rayner*	2,162	45.5	–19.1
Reform	Callum Wrighton	1,206	25.4	N/A
Green	Sam Gallon	626	13.2	–0.9
Liberal Democrats	Christopher Scott	438	9.2	–2.3
Labour	Kathleen Garlick	315	6.6	–3.1
Majority		956	20.1	–30.4
Turnout		4,754	36.1	–1.8
Registered electors		13,175		
Conservative hold				

Tonbridge (2 seats)
Party	Candidate	Votes	%	±%
Green	Mark Hood*	5,415	50.9	–3.3
Green	Paul Stepto*	4,533	42.6	–3.7
Reform	Matt Botten	2,355	22.1	N/A
Conservative	Jennifer Lewis	2,188	20.5	–18.8
Conservative	Frixos Tombolis	2,025	19.0	–19.6
Reform	Gary Longley	1,856	17.4	N/A
Liberal Democrats	Frances Hoskins	997	9.4	N/A
Liberal Democrats	Garry Bridge	651	6.1	N/A
Labour	Callum Lake	433	4.1	–2.3
Labour	Catherine Tuke	305	2.9	–2.7
Turnout		10,648	39.1	–5.4
Registered electors		27,240		
Green hold				
Green hold				

=== Tunbridge Wells ===
Tunbridge Wells district summary
Party	Seats	+/-	Votes	%	+/-
Liberal Democrats	5	▲5	9,779	32.5	+10.8
Conservative	1	▼5	6,713	22.3	–21.5
Reform UK	0	Steady	6,868	22.8	+22.6
Green	0	Steady	2,126	7.1	–4.6
Labour	0	Steady	2,049	6.8	–10.0
Alliance	0	Steady	1,968	6.5	+2.8
IfTW	0	Steady	599	2.0	N/A
Total	6	Steady	30,102	34.4	
Registered electors			87,640	–	

Division results

Cranbrook
Party	Candidate	Votes	%	±%
Conservative	Claudine Russell	1,442	28.6	–23.3
Reform	Lucie Gavrilova	1,425	28.3	+27.0
Alliance	Ellen Neville	1,107	22.0	–1.4
Liberal Democrats	Vivian Widgery	426	8.5	+3.0
Green	Helen Yeo	384	7.6	+0.3
Labour	Gergory Holder	187	3.7	–4.3
IfTW	Dan Littlechild	66	1.3	N/A
Majority		17	0.3	–28.2
Turnout		5,044	34.6	–5.7
Registered electors		14,572		
Conservative hold		Swing	▼25.2	

Tunbridge Wells East
Party	Candidate	Votes	%	±%
Liberal Democrats	Colin Sefton	1,690	36.9	+14.3
Conservative	Andrew Hobart	950	20.7	–27.1
Reform	Kris Niewolski	922	20.1	N/A
IfTW	Suzie Wakeman	375	8.2	N/A
Labour Co-op	Alan Bullion	302	6.6	–11.6
Green	Kate Sergeant	271	5.9	–5.6
Alliance	Paul Johnson	75	1.6	N/A
Majority		740	16.2	N/A
Turnout		4,595	30.9	–8.5
Registered electors		14,854		
Liberal Democrats gain from Conservative		Swing	▲20.7	

Tunbridge Wells North
Party	Candidate	Votes	%	±%
Liberal Democrats	Mark Ellis	2,026	42.5	+24.3
Reform	Christopher Hoare	1,071	22.5	N/A
Conservative	Vivek Gautam	614	12.9	–22.3
Labour	Tom Connolly	571	12.0	–21.9
Green	Maria Gavin	329	6.9	–3.6
Alliance	Kit Hawes-Webb	87	1.8	N/A
IfTW	Joe Dore	70	1.5	N/A
Majority		955	20.0	N/A
Turnout		4,783	33.6	–8.1
Registered electors		14,243		
Liberal Democrats gain from Conservative				

Tunbridge Wells Rural
Party	Candidate	Votes	%	±%
Liberal Democrats	Mark Munday	1,767	34.8	+12.3
Reform	Oliver Kinkade	1,500	29.5	N/A
Conservative	Sarah Hamilton*	1,276	25.1	–21.6
Green	Alasdair Fraser	272	5.4	–8.6
Labour	Anne Musker	141	2.8	–10.9
Alliance	Alison Webster	81	1.6	N/A
IfTW	Libby Richardson	41	0.8	N/A
Majority		267	5.3	N/A
Turnout		5,089	34.5	–8.5
Registered electors		14,772		
Liberal Democrats gain from Conservative				

Tunbridge Wells South
Party	Candidate	Votes	%	±%
Liberal Democrats	Martin Brice	2,001	37.6	+7.0
Reform	John Spence	1,044	19.6	N/A
Conservative	Sedat Zorba	1,031	19.4	–30.1
Green	Jeremy Clapham	525	9.9	–2.5
Alliance	Nick Pope	458	8.6	N/A
Labour	Kate McAlpine	257	4.8	–8.2
Majority		957	18.0	N/A
Turnout		5,322	36.3	–9.1
Registered electors		14,659		
Liberal Democrats gain from Conservative				

Tunbridge Wells West
Party	Candidate	Votes	%	±%
Liberal Democrats	John Moreland	1,869	35.1	+4.5
Conservative	Richard Long	1,400	26.3	–23.2
Reform	Rob Grindley	906	17.0	N/A
Labour	Jayne Sharratt	591	11.1	–1.9
Green	Stephanie Gandon	345	6.5	–5.9
Alliance	Clare Escombe	160	3.0	N/A
IfTW	David Kain	47	0.9	N/A
Majority		469	8.8	N/A
Turnout		5,326	36.6	–7.8
Registered electors		14,540		
Liberal Democrats gain from Conservative		Swing	▲13.9	

== Post election changes ==
- In June 2025, a Reform councillor (Daniel Taylor, Cliftonville) was suspended after being arrested.
- In September 2025, a Reform councillor defected to UKIP.
- In October 2025, Reform suspended one councillor over conduct and a further four councillors after a leadership dispute.
- In February 2026, 7 former Reform councillors joined Restore Britain.
- In February 2026, the former Reform councillor was disqualified after being jailed for controlling and coercive behaviour towards his wife, triggering a by-election.
- In April 2026, the by-election was held in Cliftonville, resulting in Green gain.

=== Cliftonville by-election, 9 April 2026 ===
The by-election attracted significant attention. Green Party leader Zack Polanski visited the seat and campaigned for Yates. Local media described the campaign as being more akin to a general election than a typical county council by-election.

The by-election resulted in a Green gain from Reform UK on an increased turnout. It was the second such gain following the Green victory in Horsley in January 2026.

Cliftonville
Party	Candidate	Votes	%	±%
Green	Rob Yates	2,068	38.8	+26.8
Reform	Marc Rattigan	1,767	33.1	−7.1
Conservative	Charlie Leys	811	15.2	–4.5
Labour	Joanne Bright	557	10.4	–11.6
Independent	Lucy Gray	68	1.3	N/A
Liberal Democrats	Mo Shafaei	63	1.2	–1.9
Majority		301	5.7	N/A
Turnout		5,334	37.7	+4.3
Rejected ballots		8	0.1	N/C
Registered electors		14,152		
Green gain from Reform				

== See also ==
- Kent County Council elections
