= 2027 Swale Borough Council election =

2027 English local government election

- 6 May 2027

All 47 seats to Swale Borough Council 24 seats needed for a majority
Leader	Tim Gibson	Lloyd Bowen	Mike Baldock
Party	Labour	Conservative	Swale Ind.
Leader's seat	Roman	Teynham & Lynsted	Borden & Grove Park
Last election	15 seats, 25.0%	12 seats, 30.4%	11 seats, 17.2%
Current seats	15	10	8
Leader	Hannah Perkin	Richard Palmer	Alastair Gould
Party	Liberal Democrats	Reform	Green
Leader's seat	Abbey	Hartlip, Newington & Upchurch	Boughton & Courtenay
Last election	5 seats, 13.0%	0 seats, 1.0%	3 seats, 8.6%
Current seats	5	4	2
Leader		Kieran Mishchuk
Party	Independent	Restore
Leader's seat		Milton Regis
Last election	1 seat, 4.2%	Did not exist
Current seats	2	1
Incumbent Leader
Tim Gibson
Labour
No overall control (Note: Labour minority.)

The 2027 Swale Borough Council election will be held on 6 May 2027 to elect members of Swale Borough Council in Kent, England. This will be on the same day as other local elections held across the United Kingdom.

== Background ==
=== Local government reorganisation ===
Due to proposed structural changes to local government in England, the 2023 election would have been the final election to the council before it was abolished and replaced by Mid Kent Council, a new unitary authority. However, on 7 September 2026, the government announced it was withdrawing plans for the planned restructuring pending review. Following this announcement, local elections due to be held in 2027 under the existing local electoral calendar would proceed.

== Summary ==
=== Election result ===
2027 Swale Borough Council election
Party	Candidates	Seats	Gains	Losses	Net gain/loss	Seats %	Votes %	Votes	+/−
Labour		15 (Note: Current seats.)							
Conservative		10							
Swale Ind.		8							
Liberal Democrats		5							
Reform		4							
Green		2							
Independent		2							
Restore		1							
