= Tony Hart (disambiguation) =

Tony Hart (1925–2009) was a British children's television personality and artist.

Tony Hart may also refer to:

- Tony Hart (theater) (1855–1891), American actor, comedian and singer
- Tony Hart (politician) (1923–2009), British businessman and politician
- Tony Hart (businessman) (1932–2020), Jamaican businessman, philanthropist, and politician

== See also ==
- Anthony Hart (c. 1754–1831), British lawyer and politician
- Anthony Hart Harrigan (1925–2010), American conservative columnist, lecturer, and author
