= Kemkaran =

Kemkaran is a surname.

- Heather Kemkaran (born 1958), Canadian figure skater
- Linden Kemkaran, British politician

== See also ==
- Khemkaran
