= 2021 Kent County Council election =

2021 UK local government election

- 2 May 2021

All 81 seats to Kent County Council 41 seats needed for a majority

	First party	Second party	Third party
Leader	Roger Gough	Dara Farrell (defeated)	Rob Bird (retired)
Party	Conservative	Labour	Liberal Democrats
Last election	67 seats	5 seats	7 seats
Seats won	62	7	6
Seat change	▼5	▲2	▼1
Popular vote	217,904	90,920	49,448
Percentage	49.1%	20.5%	11.1%
	Fourth party	Fifth party	Sixth party
Party	Green	Swale Ind.	Residents
Last election	1 seat	N/A	1 seat
Seats won	4	1	1
Seat change	▲3	▲1	Steady
Popular vote	61,355	7,109	2,155
Percentage	13.8%	1.6%	0.5%
- Winner of each seat at the 2021 Kent County Council election
Council control before election
Conservative
Council control after election
Conservative

Elections to Kent County Council were held on 6 May 2021, alongside other local elections.

81 councillors were elected from 71 electoral divisions.

== Summary ==
=== Election result ===
2021 Kent County Council election
Party	Candidates	Seats	Gains	Losses	Net gain/loss	Seats %	Votes %	Votes	+/−
Conservative	81	62	4	9	▼5	76.3	49.1	217,904	
Labour	78	7	4	2	▲2	8.8	20.5	90,920	
Liberal Democrats	65	6	2	3	▼1	7.5	11.1	49,448	
Green	65	4	4	1	▲3	5.0	13.8	61,355	
Swale Ind.	4	1	1	0	▲1	1.3	1.6	7,109	
Residents	2	1	0	0	Steady	1.3	0.5	2,155	
Independent	23	0	0	0	Steady	0.0	1.9	8,238	
Thanet Independents	2	0	0	0	Steady	0.0	0.4	1,861	
Reform	11	0	0	0	Steady	0.0	0.4	1,561	
Alliance	1	0	0	0	Steady	0.0	0.3	1,337	
UKIP	5	0	0	0	Steady	0.0	0.2	927	
Foundation	1	0	0	0	Steady	0.0	0.1	561	
Workers Party	2	0	0	0	Steady	0.0	0.1	331	
Socialist (GB)	2	0	0	0	Steady	0.0	<0.1	144	
TUSC	1	0	0	0	Steady	0.0	<0.1	91	
Women's Equality	1	0	0	0	Steady	0.0	<0.1	78	
SDP	1	0	0	0	Steady	0.0	<0.1	23	

== Results by district ==
=== Ashford ===
==== District summary ====
Party	Seats	+/-	Votes	%	+/-
Conservative	6	▲1	16,859	57.3	+2.2
Green	1	▲1	4,899	16.7	+10.9
Labour	0	▼1	5,140	17.5	+3.4
Liberal Democrat	0	▼1	2,240	7.6	–7.9
Independent	0	Steady	285	1.0	N/A

==== District results ====
Ashford Central
Party	Candidate	Votes	%	±%
Conservative	Paul Bartlett	2,144	55.8	–2.7
Labour	Kate Leavey	920	24.0	+5.6
Green	Liz Wright	535	13.9	+8.2
Liberal Democrats	Valerie Mbali	242	6.3	–4.3
Majority		1,224	31.8	–8.3
Turnout		3,874	28.4	+1.4
Registered electors		13,635		
Conservative hold		Swing	▼4.2	

Ashford East
Party	Candidate	Votes	%	±%
Green	Steve Campkin	1,854	44.5	+39.0
Conservative	Graham Galpin	1,428	34.3	+6.2
Labour	Sojan Joseph	596	14.3	–1.1
Independent	Garry Harrison	149	3.6	N/A
Liberal Democrats	Samuel Strolz	136	3.3	–37.9
Majority		426	10.2	N/A
Turnout		4,181	31.2	+0.2
Registered electors		13,397		
Green gain from Liberal Democrats		Swing	▲16.4	

Ashford Rural East
Party	Candidate	Votes	%	±%
Conservative	Clair Bell	2,878	57.3	–2.9
Green	Geoffery Meaden	858	17.1	+9.1
Liberal Democrats	Caroline Knight	656	13.1	–2.7
Labour	Alan Dean	627	12.5	+2.6
Majority		2,020	40.2	–3.8
Turnout		5,069	36.9	+1.9
Registered electors		13,720		
Conservative hold		Swing	▼6.0	

Ashford Rural South
Party	Candidate	Votes	%	±%
Conservative	David Robey	2,420	61.2	–1.0
Labour	Mark Silvester	560	14.2	+0.7
Green	Dawn Nilsson	463	11.7	+7.5
Liberal Democrats	Theresa Dickens	376	9.5	–2.3
Independent	Jason Smith	136	3.4	N/A
Majority		1,860	47.0	–1.0
Turnout		3,984	28.4	–0.6
Registered electors		14,005		
Conservative hold		Swing	▼0.9	

Ashford Rural West
Party	Candidate	Votes	%	±%
Conservative	Charlie Simkins	3,098	64.8	+2.0
Green	Hilary Jones	632	13.2	+6.8
Labour	Norma Smyth	612	12.8	+2.9
Liberal Democrats	Adrian Gee-Turner	391	8.2	–4.9
Libertarian	Andrew Lewin	51	1.1	N/A
Majority		2,466	51.6	+1.6
Turnout		4,809	32.6	+1.6
Registered electors		14,758		
Conservative hold		Swing	▼2.4	

Ashford South
Party	Candidate	Votes	%	±%
Conservative	Dirk Ross	1,407	43.7	+13.3
Labour	Dara Farrell	1,319	41.0	+8.8
Green	Thom Pizzey	263	8.2	+3.6
Liberal Democrats	Hein Behrens	232	7.2	–2.6
Majority		88	2.7	N/A
Turnout		3,252	23.8	+0.8
Registered electors		13,687		
Conservative gain from Labour		Swing	▲2.3	

Tenterden
Party	Candidate	Votes	%	±%
Conservative	Mike Hill, OBE	3,484	69.4	–1.6
Green	Guy Pullen	663	13.2	+7.6
Labour	Emma MacLennan	506	10.1	+3.8
Liberal Democrats	Chris Grayling	366	7.3	–2.2
Majority		2,821	56.2	–5.8
Turnout		5,058	35.6	–0.4
Registered electors		14,195		
Conservative hold		Swing	▼4.6	

=== Canterbury ===
==== District summary ====
Party	Seats	+/-	Votes	%	+/-
Conservative	5	▼2	17,221	43.8	–1.4
Labour	2	▲2	11,348	28.8	+7.5
Liberal Democrat	1	Steady	6,188	15.7	–4.8
Green	0	Steady	4,327	11.0	+5.3
Independent	0	Steady	263	0.7	N/A

==== District results ====
Canterbury City North
Party	Candidate	Votes	%	±%
Labour Co-op	Alister Brady	1,951	43.3	+17.7
Conservative	Naziyat Khan	1,077	23.9	–11.7
Liberal Democrats	Alex Lister	997	22.1	–2.2
Green	Henry Stanton	477	10.6	+0.3
Majority		874	19.4	N/A
Turnout		4,548	37.7	+0.7
Registered electors		12,049		
Labour Co-op gain from Conservative		Swing	▲14.7	

Canterbury City South
Party	Candidate	Votes	%	±%
Labour Co-op	Mel Dawkins	2,095	41.0	+17.0
Conservative	Sergiu Barna	1,374	26.9	+3.2
Liberal Democrats	Ida Linfield	1,109	21.7	–19.5
Green	Patricia Marsh	527	10.3	+3.4
Majority		721	14.1	N/A
Turnout		5,159	36.9	+3.9
Registered electors		13,971		
Labour Co-op gain from Liberal Democrats		Swing	▲6.9	

Canterbury North
Party	Candidate	Votes	%	±%
Conservative	Robert Thomas	2,402	53.2	–2.8
Labour	Paul Prentice	1,002	22.2	+5.3
Liberal Democrats	Alex Ricketts	602	13.3	–1.2
Green	Anna Peckham	509	11.3	+4.4
Majority		1,400	31.0	–8.0
Turnout		4,555	38.9	+5.9
Registered electors		11,718		
Conservative hold		Swing	▼4.1	

Canterbury South
Party	Candidate	Votes	%	±%
Liberal Democrats	Michael Sole	2,457	45.6	+9.0
Conservative	Michael Northey	1,966	36.5	–7.6
Labour	Connie Nolan	961	17.8	+4.4
Majority		491	9.1	N/A
Turnout		5,424	43.3	+3.3
Registered electors		12,521		
Liberal Democrats gain from Conservative		Swing	▲8.3	

Herne Bay East
Party	Candidate	Votes	%	±%
Conservative	Dan Watkins	2,366	54.2	–0.6
Labour	Simon Warley	936	21.5	+1.1
Green	Brian Shelley	635	14.6	N/A
Liberal Democrats	John Bowley	249	5.7	–5.9
Independent	Graeme Sergeant	177	4.1	N/A
Majority		1,430	32.7	–2.3
Turnout		4,363	30.4	–0.6
Registered electors		14,330		
Conservative hold		Swing	▼0.9	

Herne Village and Sturry
Party	Candidate	Votes	%	±%
Conservative	Alan Marsh	2,911	60.3	+0.2
Labour	Jean Butcher	1,015	21.0	+3.5
Green	Andy Harvey	640	13.3	+9.0
Liberal Democrats	Gwilym Maltby	259	5.4	–3.8
Majority		1,896	39.3	–2.7
Turnout		4,848	30.4	+1.4
Registered electors		15,936		
Conservative hold		Swing	▼1.7	

Whitstable East and Herne Bay West
Party	Candidate	Votes	%	±%
Conservative	Neil Baker	2,703	53.9	+5.6
Labour	Dan Allen	1,162	23.2	+5.9
Green	Keith Bothwell	804	16.0	+11.9
Liberal Democrats	James Flanagan	342	6.8	–8.6
Majority		1,541	30.7	–0.3
Turnout		5,051	35.9	+3.9
Registered electors		14,080		
Conservative hold		Swing	▼0.2	

Whitstable West
Party	Candidate	Votes	%	±%
Conservative	Mark Dance	2,422	42.9	+0.9
Labour	Naomi Smith	2,236	39.6	+6.8
Green	Nicole David	735	13.0	+6.1
Liberal Democrats	Yvonne Hawkins	173	3.1	–7.4
Independent	Joseph Egerton	86	1.5	N/A
Majority		186	3.3	–5.7
Turnout		5,700	38.9	+2.9
Registered electors		14,640		
Conservative hold		Swing	▼3.0	

=== Dartford ===
==== District summary ====
Party	Seats	+/-	Votes	%	+/-
Conservative	4	▼1	12,211	52.9	–0.7
Labour	1	▲1	7,101	30.8	+4.9
Residents	1	Steady	2,155	9.3	+4.4
Green	0	Steady	1,157	5.0	+4.3
Reform UK	0	Steady	460	2.0	N/A

==== District results ====
Dartford East
Party	Candidate	Votes	%	±%
Conservative	Penny Cole	1,729	49.7	–11.9
Labour	Claire Pearce	1,015	29.2	+6.8
Residents	Katie Lynch	734	21.1	N/A
Majority		714	20.5	–19.5
Turnout		3,514	26.7	+3.7
Registered electors		13,161		
Conservative hold		Swing	▼9.4	

Dartford North East
Party	Candidate	Votes	%	±%
Labour	Kelly Jane Grehan	1,872	43.5	+3.4
Conservative	Peter Whapshott	1,763	41.0	–1.4
Green	Laura Edie	559	13.0	+8.7
Reform	Barry Taylor	106	2.5	N/A
Majority		109	2.5	N/A
Turnout		4,352	27.7	–0.3
Registered electors		15,685		
Labour gain from Conservative		Swing	▲2.4	

Dartford Rural
Party	Candidate	Votes	%	±%
Conservative	Jeremy Kite	3,172	74.1	+4.0
Labour	Joshua Grills	694	16.2	+0.4
Green	Mark Lindop	284	6.6	N/A
Reform	Howard Bostridge	133	3.1	N/A
Majority		2,478	57.9	+3.9
Turnout		4,307	33.8	+0.8
Registered electors		12,733		
Conservative hold		Swing	▲1.8	

Dartford West
Party	Candidate	Votes	%	±%
Conservative	Jan Ozog	2,649	60.5	+11.4
Labour Co-op	Lucy Robinson	1,565	35.7	+3.6
Reform	Gary Rogers	166	3.8	N/A
Majority		1,084	24.8	+7.8
Turnout		4,429	31.3	+0.3
Registered electors		14,166		
Conservative hold		Swing	▲3.9	

Swanscombe and Greenhithe
Party	Candidate	Votes	%	±%
Residents	Peter Harman	1,421	40.4	–2.1
Labour Co-op	Sacha Gosine	1,130	32.1	+7.4
Conservative	Danny Nicklen	911	25.9	+1.2
Reform	David Martin-Garcia	55	1.6	N/A
Majority		291	8.3	–9.7
Turnout		3,548	27.5	+3.5
Registered electors		12,884		
Residents hold		Swing	▼4.8	

Wilmington
Party	Candidate	Votes	%	±%
Conservative	Ann Allen	2,987	72.4	+9.4
Labour	Maria Perry	825	20.0	–0.3
Green	Deborah Edge	314	7.6	N/A
Majority		1,162	52.4	+9.4
Turnout		4,161	31.3	+0.3
Registered electors		13,292		
Conservative hold		Swing	▲4.9	

=== Dover ===
==== District summary ====
Party	Seats	+/-	Votes	%	+/-
Conservative	7	Steady	20,540	50.6	+1.8
Labour	0	Steady	11,834	29.1	–1.3
Green	0	Steady	4,216	10.4	+6.4
Liberal Democrats	0	Steady	2,084	5.1	–1.8
Independent	0	Steady	1,609	4.0	+3.6
Workers Party	0	Steady	331	0.8	N/A

==== District results ====
Deal and Walmer (2 seats)
Party	Candidate	Votes	%	±%
Conservative	Trevor Bond	3,964	49.6	+1.1
Conservative	Derek Murphy	3,693	46.2	+2.9
Labour	Eileen Rowbotham	2,793	35.0	+0.1
Labour	Edward Biggs	2,407	30.1	–3.5
Green	Mike Eddy	1,604	20.1	+14.1
Liberal Democrats	Penelope James	462	5.8	–3.7
Liberal Democrats	John Gosling	377	4.7	–2.7
Independent	Chris Tough	341	4.3	+2.1
Independent	Bobby Falaise	269	3.4	N/A
Workers Party	Christopher Tasker	70	0/9	N/A
Turnout		8,445	35.0	±0.0
Registered electors		24,123		
Conservative hold				
Conservative hold				

Dover North
Party	Candidate	Votes	%	±%
Conservative	Stephen Manion	2,138	51.8	–1.9
Labour	Charles Woodgate	1,076	26.1	–4.3
Green	Sarah Waite-Gleave	747	18.1	+10.0
Liberal Democrats	Annabel Stogdon	168	4.1	N/A
Majority		1,062	25.7	+1.7
Turnout		4,166	33.7	–0.3
Registered electors		12,358		
Conservative hold		Swing	▲1.2	

Dover Town (2 seats)
Party	Candidate	Votes	%	±%
Conservative	Nigel Collor	2,987	43.7	+8.2
Conservative	Oliver Richardson	2,287	39.7	–1.7
Labour	Dom Howden	1,935	33.6	–4.0
Labour	Charlotte Zosseder	1,867	30.7	+1.7
Green	Beccy Sawbridge	924	16.1	+9.3
Independent	Graham Wanstall	583	10.1	N/A
Liberal Democrats	Roben Franklin	367	6.4	+0.3
Liberal Democrats	Luke Lyden	298	5.2	–0.4
Workers Party	David Kerr	261	4.5	N/A
Turnout		6,197	24.6	–2.4
Registered electors		25,144		
Conservative hold				
Conservative hold				

Dover West
Party	Candidate	Votes	%	±%
Conservative	David Beaney	2,663	62.0	+1.2
Labour Co-op	Pamela Brivio	1,007	23.4	+5.4
Green	Nicolas Shread	433	10.1	+5.8
Liberal Democrats	Rick Blackwell	193	4.5	–2.5
Majority		1,656	38.6	–4.4
Turnout		4,329	33.6	–0.4
Registered electors		12,898		
Conservative hold		Swing	▼2.1	

Sandwich
Party	Candidate	Votes	%	±%
Conservative	Sue Chandler	2,808	59.7	–1.6
Labour	Barney Sadler	749	15.9	–1.9
Green	Abigail Stroud	508	10.8	+5.4
Independent	Paul Carter	416	8.9	N/A
Liberal Democrats	Vernon Recas	219	4.7	–4.7
Majority		2,059	43.8	+0.8
Turnout		4,743	35.0	–1.0
Registered electors		13,568		
Conservative hold		Swing	▲0.2	

=== Folkestone and Hythe ===
==== District summary ====
Party	Seats	+/-	Votes	%	+/-
Conservative	5	Steady	12,920	47.1	+4.4
Labour	1	▲1	5,465	19.9	+8.0
Green	0	▼1	3,935	14.3	–0.6
Liberal Democrats	0	Steady	3,024	11.0	–1.8
Foundation	0	Steady	561	2.0	N/A
UKIP	0	Steady	498	1.8	–11.1
Independent	0	Steady	485	1.8	–2.6
Reform UK	0	Steady	309	1.1	N/A
Socialist (GB)	0	Steady	144	0.5	+0.3
TUSC	0	Steady	81	0.3	N/A

==== District results ====
Cheriton, Sandgate and Hythe East
Party	Candidate	Votes	%	±%
Conservative	Rory Love	2,143	41.6	−0.6
Liberal Democrats	Tim Prater	2,122	41.2	+17.6
Labour	Paul Bingham	792	15.4	−1.2
TUSC	Eric Segal	91	1.8	N/A
Majority		21	0.4	
Turnout		5,148	34.6	
Conservative hold		Swing	▼9.1	

Elham Valley
Party	Candidate	Votes	%	±%
Conservative	Susan Carey	1,809	50.1	−4.2
Green	Douglas Wade	1,335	37.0	+24.6
Labour	Robin Potter	247	6.8	−3.4
Independent	Andrew Russell	221	6.1	N/A
Majority		474	13.1	▼27.9
Turnout		3,620	25.5	
Conservative hold		Swing		

The election in Elham Valley was deferred to 17 June 2021 due to the death of a candidate after the close of nominations.

Folkestone East
Party	Candidate	Votes	%	±%
Labour	Jackie Meade	1,324	38.2	+12.5
Conservative	Dick Pascoe	1,132	32.7	−3.0
Foundation	Mary Lawes	561	16.2	N/A
Liberal Democrats	Harry Scott-Sansom	361	10.4	−6.4
Socialist (GB)	Max Hess	89	2.6	+1.1
Majority		192	5.5	
Turnout		3,467	25.7	
Labour gain from Conservative		Swing	▲7.8	

Folkestone West
Party	Candidate	Votes	%	±%
Conservative	Dylan Jeffrey	2,105	43.1	−1.1
Labour	Laura Davison	1,792	36.7	+16.4
Liberal Democrats	Alison Pemberton	541	11.1	−1.5
Independent	Diane Priestley	264	5.4	N/A
Reform	David Smith	127	2.6	N/A
Socialist (GB)	Andy Thomas	55	1.1	+0.5
Majority		313	6.4	
Turnout		4,884	33.2	
Conservative hold		Swing	▼8.8	

Hythe West
Party	Candidate	Votes	%	±%
Conservative	Andy Weatherhead	2,592	49.1	+11.2
Green	Georgina Treloar	1,997	37.8	−3.6
Labour	Anthony Goode	499	9.5	+3.2
UKIP	Len Laws	189	3.6	−5.5
Majority		595	11.3	
Turnout		5,277	39.9	
Conservative gain from Green		Swing	▲7.4	

Romney Marsh
Party	Candidate	Votes	%	±%
Conservative	Tony Hills	3,139	62.2	+20.1
Labour	Tony Cooper	811	16.1	+9.2
Green	Malcolm Watkinson	603	12.0	+7.9
UKIP	Ian Meyers	309	6.1	−14.3
Reform	Eric Elliott	182	3.6	N/A
Majority		2,328	46.1	
Turnout		5,044	33.3	
Conservative hold		Swing	▲5.5	

=== Gravesham ===
==== District summary ====
Party	Seats	+/-	Votes	%	+/-
Conservative	4	▲1	18,793	51.2	+4.3
Labour	1	▼1	14,006	38.1	+1.6
Liberal Democrats	0	Steady	2,033	5.5	+0.6
Green	0	Steady	1,895	5.2	+1.8

==== District results ====
Gravesend East (2 seats)
Party	Candidate	Votes	%	±%
Conservative	Jordan Meade	4,272	53.8	+4.6
Conservative	Alan Ridgers*	3,813	48.1	+3.9
Labour	Emma Morley	3,335	42.0	+5.1
Labour	Tony Rana	2,993	37.7	+1.5
Green	Martin Wilson	687	8.7	+3.6
Liberal Democrats	Ukonu Obasi	391	4.9	–0.1
Liberal Democrats	Kieran Wright	376	4.7	+1.2
Turnout		8,640	27.7	+1.7
Registered electors		31,140		
Conservative hold				
Conservative hold				

Gravesham Rural
Party	Candidate	Votes	%	±%
Conservative	Bryan Sweetland	3,696	67.1	–4.4
Labour	Daniel Baber	814	14.8	+1.5
Liberal Democrats	Robin Banks	625	11.3	+3.4
Green	Susan Hodge	375	6.8	N/A
Majority		2,881	52.3	–5.7
Turnout		5,559	35.8	–0.2
Registered electors		15,511		
Conservative hold		Swing	▼3.0	

Northfleet and Gravesend West (2 seats)
Party	Candidate	Votes	%	±%
Conservative	Conrad Broadley	3,609	47.0	+6.7
Labour	Lauren Sullivan*	3,461	45.1	+2.0
Labour	John Burden	3,403	44.3	–0.7
Conservative	Gary Harding	3,403	44.3	+6.9
Green	Richard Bayfield	833	10.9	+6.5
Liberal Democrats	Sharan Virk	641	8.4	+3.8
Turnout		8,472	28.2	–1.8
Registered electors		30,093		
Conservative gain from Labour				
Labour hold				

=== Maidstone ===
==== District summary ====
Party	Seats	+/-	Votes	%	+/-
Conservative	7	▲1	24,293	48.1	+0.2
Liberal Democrats	2	▼1	10,150	20.1	–11.1
Labour	0	Steady	7,570	15.0	+6.1
Green	0	Steady	6,340	12.6	+7.8
Independent	0	Steady	1,903	3.8	+3.5
Reform UK	0	Steady	250	0.5	N/A

==== District results ====
Maidstone Central (2 seats)
Party	Candidate	Votes	%	±%
Conservative	Tom Cannon	3,484	40.5	+2.8
Liberal Democrats	Dan Daley	2,880	33.5	–15.2
Conservative	John Perry	2,562	29.8	–1.1
Liberal Democrats	Chris Passmore	2,207	25.7	–17.5
Labour	Patrick Coates	1,817	21.1	+3.0
Labour	Paul Harper	1,748	20.3	N/A
Green	Donna Greenan	1,389	16.2	+9.7
Green	Stuart Jeffery	1,098	12.8	+6.7
Majority		318	4	N/A
Conservative gain from Liberal Democrats				
Liberal Democrats hold				

Maidstone North East
Party	Candidate	Votes	%	±%
Liberal Democrats	Ian Chittenden	1,793	39.2	–11.1
Conservative	Scott Hahnefeld	1,678	36.7	+4.9
Labour	John Randall	584	12.8	+5.3
Green	Kimberley Milham	517	11.3	+8.0
Majority		115	2.5	–15.5
Turnout		4,654	32.8	+0.8
Registered electors		14,196		
Liberal Democrats hold		Swing	▼8.0	

Maidstone Rural East
Party	Candidate	Votes	%	±%
Conservative	Shellina Prendergast	3,884	65.3	–4.2
Green	Susan Parr	1,073	18.0	+14.0
Labour	Marlyn Randall	515	8.7	+0.8
Liberal Democrats	Hannah Perkin	332	5.6	–3.5
Reform	Twiz Stripp	144	2.4	N/A
Majority		2,811	47.3	–13.7
Turnout		6,007	40.0	+4.0
Registered electors		15,010		
Conservative hold		Swing	▼9.1	

Maidstone Rural North
Party	Candidate	Votes	%	±%
Conservative	Paul Carter	3,441	67.2	+1.3
Labour	Jo Burns	721	14.1	+4.6
Green	Ian McDonald	574	11.2	+6.9
Liberal Democrats	Sam Burrows	387	7.6	–3.9
Majority		2,720	53.1	–1.9
Turnout		5,175	36.6	+3.6
Registered electors		14,116		
Conservative hold		Swing	▼1.7	

Maidstone Rural South
Party	Candidate	Votes	%	±%
Conservative	Lottie Parfitt-Reid	2,495	45.7	–22.4
Independent	Eric Hotson	1,711	31.4	N/A
Green	Steven Cheeseman	659	12.1	+3.8
Labour	Bob Millar	483	8.9	–0.4
Reform	Justin Randall	106	1.9	N/A
Majority		784	14.3	–39.7
Turnout		5,492	39.2	+5.2
Registered electors		13,998		
Conservative hold				

Maidstone Rural West
Party	Candidate	Votes	%	±%
Conservative	Simon Webb	2,985	60.0	+11.2
Liberal Democrats	Ashleigh Kimmance	740	14.9	–20.7
Green	Mike Summersgill	738	14.8	+11.9
Labour	Richard Coates	509	10.2	+4.8
Majority		2,245	45.1	+32.1
Turnout		5,125	39.2	+0.2
Registered electors		13,088		
Conservative hold		Swing	▲16.0	

Maidstone South
Party	Candidate	Votes	%	±%
Conservative	Paul Cooper	1,770	42.4	+0.3
Liberal Democrats	Brian Clark	1,460	35.0	–0.1
Labour	Kim Roberts	461	11.0	+2.7
Green	Stephen Muggeridge	292	7.0	+4.7
Independent	Gary Butler	104	2.5	+1.5
Independent	Yolande Kenward	88	2.1	+0.3
Majority		310	7.4	+0.4
Turnout		4,206	30.2	–2.8
Registered electors		13,946		
Conservative hold		Swing	▲0.2	

Maidstone South East
Party	Candidate	Votes	%	±%
Conservative	Gary Cooke	1,994	64.8	+13.0
Labour	Dan Wilkinson	732	23.8	+6.6
Liberal Democrats	David Naghi	351	11.4	+2.9
Majority		1,262	41.0	+8.0
Turnout		3,134	23.6	–0.4
Registered electors		13,282		
Conservative hold		Swing	▲6.4	

=== Sevenoaks ===
==== District summary ====
Party	Seats	+/-	Votes	%	+/-
Conservative	5	▼1	17,662	56.3	–6.8
Liberal Democrats	1	▲1	5,468	17.4	+1.6
Green	0	Steady	4,318	13.8	+8.0
Labour	0	Steady	3,105	9.9	–1.2
Independent	0	Steady	837	2.7	+2.4

==== District results ====
Sevenoaks North and Darent Valley
Party	Candidate	Votes	%	±%
Conservative	Roger Gough	3,491	64.3	–0.1
Green	Michael Barker	691	12.7	+3.6
Labour	David Griffiths	625	11.5	+1.7
Liberal Democrats	Tristan Ward	619	11.4	+2.1
Majority		2,800	51.6	–2.4
Turnout		5,477	34.0	+2.0
Registered electors		16,091		
Conservative hold		Swing	▼1.9	

Sevenoaks Rural North East
Party	Candidate	Votes	%	±%
Conservative	David Brazier	2,887	59.0	–18.6
Green	Laura Manston	1,632	33.4	+23.4
Labour	Ian Rashbrook	372	7.6	–4.8
Majority		1,255	25.6	–40.4
Turnout		4,929	34.3	+4.3
Registered electors		14,376		
Conservative hold		Swing	▼21.0	

Sevenoaks Rural South
Party	Candidate	Votes	%	±%
Conservative	Margot McArthur	2,845	61.4	–2.0
Green	Hill Harris	638	13.8	+7.3
Liberal Democrats	Flora Nedelcu	599	12.9	–7.4
Labour	Neil Proudfoot	549	11.9	+3.7
Majority		2,207	47.6	+4.6
Turnout		4,679	34.2	+0.2
Registered electors		13,681		
Conservative hold		Swing	▼4.7	

Sevenoaks Town
Party	Candidate	Votes	%	±%
Liberal Democrats	Richard Streatfeild	2,919	45.3	+5.7
Conservative	Margaret Crabtree	2,740	42.5	–5.5
Green	Paul Wharton	497	7.7	N/A
Labour	Jackie Griffiths	293	4.5	–2.2
Majority		179	2.8	N/A
Turnout		6,407	41.9	+6.9
Registered electors		15,303		
Liberal Democrats gain from Conservative		Swing	▲5.1	

Sevenoaks West
Party	Candidate	Votes	%	±%
Conservative	Nick Chard	3,224	58.6	–4.8
Liberal Democrats	Tom Mackay	1,135	20.6	+5.5
Green	Richard Cobbold	653	11.9	+5.7
Labour	Helen Fiorini	493	9.0	±0.0
Majority		2,089	38.0	–10.0
Turnout		5,560	35.8	+3.8
Registered electors		15,534		
Conservative hold		Swing	▼5.2	

Swanley
Party	Candidate	Votes	%	±%
Conservative	Perry Cole	2,475	55.1	–9.7
Independent	Tony Searles	837	18.6	N/A
Labour	Karimah Kelly	773	17.2	–6.6
Green	Philip Levy	207	4.6	+1.4
Liberal Democrats	Jon Alexander	196	4.4	–1.3
Majority		1,638	36.5	–4.5
Turnout		4,512	28.4	+3.4
Registered electors		15,912		
Conservative hold				

=== Swale ===
==== District summary ====
Party	Seats	+/-	Votes	%	+/-
Conservative	4	▼2	18,424	46.4	+2.9
Swale Ind.	1	▲1	7,109	17.9	N/A
Green	1	▲1	4,944	12.5	+8.7
Liberal Democrats	1	Steady	3,686	9.3	–1.6
Labour	0	Steady	4,831	12.2	–9.3
Independent	0	Steady	442	1.1	–0.8
Reform UK	0	Steady	252	0.6	N/A

==== District results ====
Faversham
Party	Candidate	Votes	%	±%
Liberal Democrats	Antony Hook	2,775	44.6	+1.5
Conservative	Andy Culham	1,907	30.6	–4.6
Labour	Andrew Birkin	1,099	17.7	+4.0
Independent	Benjamin Martin	442	7.1	N/A
Majority		868	14.0	+6.0
Turnout		6,265	40.3	–2.7
Registered electors		15,558		
Liberal Democrats hold		Swing	▲3.1	

Sheppey (2 seats)
Party	Candidate	Votes	%	±%
Conservative	Cameron Beart	4,680	69.4	+23.4
Conservative	Andy Booth	3,464	51.4	+6.6
Swale Ind.	Elliott Jayes	1,679	24.9	+16.1
Labour	Angela Harrison	1,526	22.6	–3.8
Green	Catherine Whittle	703	10.4	+5.4
Green	Sam Collins	647	9.6	+6.6
Liberal Democrats	Linda Brinklow	337	5.0	+2.4
Reform	Mini Nissanga	252	3.7	N/A
Liberal Democrats	Ben Martin	203	3.0	N/A
Turnout		7,582	23.9	–0.1
Registered electors		31,741		
Conservative hold				
Conservative hold				

Sittingbourne North
Party	Candidate	Votes	%	±%
Conservative	Mike Dendor	1,695	42.3	+1.7
Labour	Steve Davey	1,021	25.5	–6.3
Swale Ind.	James Hall	912	22.7	N/A
Green	Hannah Temple	218	5.4	+3.5
Liberal Democrats	Mary Zeng	164	4.1	–4.7
Majority		674	16.8	+7.8
Turnout		4,039	24.5	+0.5
Registered electors		16,518		
Conservative hold		Swing	▲4.0	

Sittingbourne South
Party	Candidate	Votes	%	±%
Conservative	John Wright	1,868	40.2	–1.6
Swale Ind.	Richard Palmer	1,500	32.3	N/A
Labour Co-op	Lola Oyewusi	765	16.5	–24.9
Green	David Walton	309	6.6	+5.0
Liberal Democrats	Alexander Stennings	207	4.5	+0.5
Majority		368	7.9	+6.9
Turnout		4,679	32.7	–0.3
Registered electors		14,292		
Conservative hold				

Swale East
Party	Candidate	Votes	%	±%
Green	Rich Lehmann	3,067	51.7	+44.1
Conservative	Charlotte Whitney-Brown	2,443	41.2	–12.8
Labour Co-op	Frances Rehal	420	7.1	–5.9
Majority		624	10.5	N/A
Turnout		5,966	42.5	+5.5
Registered electors		14,049		
Green gain from Conservative		Swing	▲28.5	

Swale West
Party	Candidate	Votes	%	±%
Swale Ind.	Mike Baldock	3,018	56.0	N/A
Conservative	Mike Whiting	2,367	44.0	+1.2
Majority		651	12.0	N/A
Turnout		5,471	31.9	–0.1
Registered electors		17,131		
Swale Ind. gain from Conservative				

=== Thanet ===
==== District summary ====
Party	Seats	+/-	Votes	%	+/-
Conservative	5	Steady	19,994	45.5	–0.3
Labour	2	Steady	10,797	24.6	–1.3
Green	0	Steady	8,558	19.5	+17.5
Thanet Independent	0	Steady	1,861	4.2	N/A
Liberal Democrats	0	Steady	1,771	4.0	–3.7
Independent	0	Steady	652	1.5	–1.5
Reform UK	0	Steady	216	0.5	N/A
Women's Equality	0	Steady	78	0.2	N/A
SDP	0	Steady	23	0.1	N/A

==== District results ====
Birchington and Rural (2 seats)
Party	Candidate	Votes	%	±%
Conservative	Linda Ann Wright	4,013	55.4	–0.7
Conservative	Derek Crow-Brown	3,846	53.1	+2.3
Labour	Rob Yates	1,606	22.2	+4.2
Thanet Ind.	Bertie James Braidwood	1,525	21.0	N/A
Green	Abi Smith	1,483	20.5	+14.3
Green	Rob Edwards	971	13.4	N/A
Liberal Democrats	Martyn Pennington	476	6.6	–6.7
Liberal Democrats	Jeremy Ian de Rose	354	4.9	–5.2
Reform	Edwin Handford	216	3.0	N/A
Turnout		8,092	29.9	–2.1
Registered electors		27,055		
Conservative hold				
Conservative hold				

Broadstairs
Party	Candidate	Votes	%	±%
Conservative	Rosalind Binks	2,695	50.6	–7.0
Labour	Aram Ahmed Rawf	1,549	29.1	+7.7
Green	Mike Garner	905	17.0	+13.4
Liberal Democrats	Robert Stone	176	3.3	–3.6
Majority		1,146	21.5	–15.5
Turnout		5,359	36.9	–1.1
Registered electors		14,531		
Conservative hold		Swing	▼7.4	

Cliftonville
Party	Candidate	Votes	%	±%
Conservative	Lesley Game	2,468	57.4	+1.9
Labour	Helen Whitehead	1,134	26.4	+6.4
Green	Michelle Thomas	445	10.4	+7.7
Liberal Democrats	George Metcalfe	148	3.4	–1.7
Women's Equality	Kanndiss Riley	78	1.8	N/A
SDP	Josh Sims	23	0.5	N/A
Majority		1,334	31.0	–4.0
Turnout		4,335	30.4	–4.6
Registered electors		14,262		
Conservative hold		Swing	▼2.3	

Margate
Party	Candidate	Votes	%	±%
Labour	Barry Lewis	1,376	42.1	–2.3
Conservative	Ash Ashbee	1,292	39.5	–2.1
Green	Sue Rees	423	12.9	+8.2
Liberal Democrats	John Finnegan	178	5.4	–0.5
Majority		84	2.6	+0.6
Turnout		3,320	22.1	–1.9
Registered electors		15,043		
Labour hold		Swing	▼0.1	

Ramsgate
Party	Candidate	Votes	%	±%
Conservative	Trevor Shonk	3,157	34.9	+3.2
Labour	Karen Constantine	2,864	34.6	–0.6
Green	Becky Wing	2,576	31.1	N/A
Conservative	Christian Burwash	2,523	30.5	–1.9
Labour	Mark Hopkinson	2,268	27.4	–7.2
Green	Katie Gerrard	1,755	21.2	N/A
Independent	Grahame Birchall	404	4.9	N/A
Thanet Ind.	George Rusiecki	336	4.1	N/A
Independent	Paul Messenger	248	3.0	N/A
Liberal Democrats	Gail Banks	239	2.9	–2.4
Liberal Democrats	David Banks	200	2.4	–2.8
Turnout		8,800	27.8	–2.2
Registered electors		31,639		
Conservative hold				
Labour hold				

=== Tonbridge and Malling ===
==== District summary ====
Party	Seats	+/-	Votes	%	+/-
Conservative	4	▼2	23,355	49.3	–8.7
Green	2	▲2	13,584	28.7	+20.8
Liberal Democrats	1	Steady	5,063	10.7	–7.8
Labour	0	Steady	3,920	8.3	–2.3
Independent	0	Steady	1,441	3.0	N/A

==== District results ====
Malling Central
Party	Candidate	Votes	%	±%
Liberal Democrats	Trudy Dean	2,979	67.7	+10.9
Conservative	David Thompson	1,182	26.8	–7.1
Labour	Sarah Palmer	197	4.5	–0.8
Labour	Rizwana Shelley	45	1.0	N/A
Majority		1,797	40.9	+17.9
Turnout		4,441	34.4	–1.6
Registered electors		12,904		
Liberal Democrats hold		Swing	▲8.6	

Malling North
Party	Candidate	Votes	%	±%
Conservative	Sarah Hohler	2,757	63.7	–1.6
Labour	Wayne Mallard	875	20.2	+0.4
Liberal Democrats	Nick Stapleton	693	16.0	+5.3
Majority		1,882	43.5	–1.5
Turnout		4,353	29.0	+1.0
Registered electors		15,020		
Conservative hold		Swing	▼1.0	

Malling North East
Party	Candidate	Votes	%	±%
Conservative	Andrew Kennedy	3,807	72.6	+3.4
Labour	Thomas Shelley	587	11.2	–1.6
Liberal Democrats	Timothy Bishop	460	8.8	–4.6
Green	Archie Mitchell	387	7.4	+2.7
Majority		3,220	61.4	+5.4
Turnout		5,280	33.7	+1.7
Registered electors		15,669		
Conservative hold		Swing	▲2.5	

Malling Rural East
Party	Candidate	Votes	%	±%
Conservative	Sarah Hudson	3,299	64.9	–9.5
Green	Steve Crisp	731	14.4	+4.0
Labour	Robin Potter	380	7.5	N/A
Liberal Democrats	Andrew Russell	365	7.2	–8.1
No Description	Raja Zahidi	158	3.1	N/A
Independent	Louis Westlake	150	3.0	N/A
Majority		2,568	50.5	–8.5
Turnout		5,119	35.3	+4.3
Registered electors		14,503		
Conservative hold		Swing	▼6.8	

Malling West
Party	Candidate	Votes	%	±%
Conservative	Harry Rayner	3,178	64.6	–4.7
Green	Richard Mountford	696	14.1	+7.4
Liberal Democrats	Helen Hobhouse	566	11.5	+1.6
Labour	Kathleen Garlick	479	9.7	+2.4
Majority		2,482	50.5	–8.5
Turnout		4,960	37.9	+1.9
Registered electors		13,083		
Conservative hold		Swing	▼6.1	

Tonbridge
Party	Candidate	Votes	%	±%
Green	Mark Hood	6,346	54.2	+42.3
Green	Paul Stepto	5,424	46.3	+35.6
Conservative	Michael Payne	4,608	39.3	–14.3
Conservative	Richard Long	4,524	38.6	–12.9
Labour	Carl Marten	750	6.4	–7.6
Labour	Sean O'Malley	652	5.6	–6.0
Independent	David Allen	599	5.1	N/A
Independent	Colin Hussey	534	4.6	N/A
Turnout		12,320	44.5	+11.5
Registered electors		27,673		
Green gain from Conservative				
Green gain from Conservative				

=== Tunbridge Wells ===
==== District summary ====
Party	Seats	+/-	Votes	%	+/-
Conservative	6	Steady	15,632	43.8	–9.1
Liberal Democrats	0	Steady	7,741	21.7	+4.5
Labour	0	Steady	6,003	16.8	+2.9
Green	0	Steady	4,182	11.7	+8.5
Alliance	0	Steady	1,337	3.7	N/A
UKIP	0	Steady	429	1.2	–3.6
Independent	0	Steady	321	0.9	–5.5
Reform UK	0	Steady	74	0.2	N/A

==== District results ====
Cranbrook
Party	Candidate	Votes	%	±%
Conservative	Seán Holden	2,967	51.9	–8.3
Alliance	Nancy Warne	1,337	23.4	+3.1
Labour	James Groome	455	8.0	+1.7
Green	John Hurst	417	7.3	N/A
Liberal Democrats	Gillian Douglass	316	5.5	–7.8
Independent	Venetia Carpenter	156	2.7	N/A
Reform	Toby Stripp	74	1.3	N/A
Majority		1,630	28.5	–11.5
Turnout		5,746	40.3	+5.3
Registered electors		14,251		
Conservative hold		Swing	▼5.7	

Tunbridge Wells East
Party	Candidate	Votes	%	±%
Conservative	Paul Barrington-King	2,693	47.8	+6.3
Liberal Democrats	Alan Bullion	1,272	22.6	+3.2
Labour	Martin Betts	1,023	18.2	+6.2
Green	Trevor Bisdee	645	11.5	N/A
Majority		1,421	25.2	+3.2
Turnout		5,694	39.4	+4.4
Registered electors		14,458		
Conservative hold		Swing	▲1.6	

Tunbridge Wells North
Party	Candidate	Votes	%	±%
Conservative	Peter Oakford	2,048	35.2	–7.0
Labour	Mike Tapp	1,968	33.9	+7.8
Liberal Democrats	Aqab Malik	1,057	18.2	–6.3
Green	Anthony Hoskin	611	10.5	+7.8
UKIP	Christine Marshall	127	2.2	–2.3
Majority		80	1.3	–14.7
Turnout		5,852	41.7	+6.7
Registered electors		14,050		
Conservative hold		Swing	▼7.4	

Tunbridge Wells Rural
Party	Candidate	Votes	%	±%
Conservative	Sarah Hamilton	2,656	46.7	–18.5
Liberal Democrats	Hugh Patterson	1,281	22.5	+11.9
Green	Christine Spicer	794	14.0	+9.1
Labour	Derek Boyle	777	13.7	+0.3
UKIP	Christopher Hoare	178	3.1	–2.8
Majority		1,375	24.2	–27.8
Turnout		5,736	43.0	+8.0
Registered electors		13,339		
Conservative hold		Swing	▼15.2	

Tunbridge Wells South
Party	Candidate	Votes	%	±%
Conservative	Becki Bruneau	2,553	49.5	–13.9
Liberal Democrats	Anne Sullivan	1,980	30.6	+13.1
Labour	Lorna Blackmore	837	13.0	+1.7
Green	Evelien Hurst-Buist	803	12.4	+8.2
Independent	Penny Kift	165	2.6	N/A
UKIP	Alun Elder-Brown	124	1.9	–2.4
Majority		573	18.9	–17.1
Turnout		6,499	45.4	+9.4
Registered electors		14,320		
Conservative hold		Swing	▼13.5	

Tunbridge Wells West
Party	Candidate	Votes	%	±%
Conservative	James McInroy	2,715	42.4	–12.8
Liberal Democrats	David Osborne	1,835	28.6	+10.7
Labour	Anne Musker	943	14.7	+0.1
Green	Aimee Taylor	912	14.2	+7.1
Majority		880	13.8	–23.2
Turnout		6,461	44.4	+9.4
Registered electors		14,546		
Conservative hold		Swing	▼11.8	

== Changes 2021–2025 ==
=== Wilmington ===
Wilmington: 27 January 2022
Party	Candidate	Votes	%	±%
Conservative	Av Sandhu	1,787	57.9	−14.5
Labour	Darren Povey	613	19.9	−0.1
Liberal Democrats	Amanda Capell	487	15.8	N/A
Green	Julian Hood	200	6.5	−1.1
Majority		1,174	38.0	
Turnout		3,087		
Conservative hold		Swing	▼7.2	

=== Hythe West ===
Hythe West: 2 March 2023
Party	Candidate	Votes	%	±%
Green	Jenni Hawkins	1,568	43.8	+6.0
Conservative	John Gabris	1,081	30.2	–18.9
Labour	Tony Cooper	384	10.7	+1.3
Independent	Ian Meyers	306	8.6	N/A
Independent	Andy Weatherhead	237	6.6	N/A
Majority		487	13.6	
Turnout		3,576		
Green gain from Conservative		Swing	▲12.5	

=== Sheppey ===
Sheppey: 5 May 2023
Party	Candidate	Votes	%	±%
Conservative	Mike Whiting	2,318	33.3	–17.7
Swale Ind.	Elliott Jayes	2,258	32.5	+14.2
Labour	Peter Apps	1,896	27.3	+10.7
Liberal Democrats	Linda Brinklow	481	6.9	+3.2
Majority		60	0.8	
Turnout		7,018	22.2	
Registered electors		31,624		
Conservative hold		Swing	▼16.0	

=== Maidstone Central ===
Maidstone Central: 6 July 2023
Party	Candidate	Votes	%	±%
Liberal Democrats	Chris Passmore	1,860	28.5	–1.6
Green	Stuart Jeffery	1,849	28.4	+13.9
Conservative	Stanley Forecast	1,564	24.0	–12.4
Labour	David Collier	914	14.0	–5.0
Reform	Graham Jarvis	278	4.3	N/A
Independent	Yolande Kenward	56	0.9	N/A
Majority		11	0.1	
Turnout		6,531		
Liberal Democrats hold		Swing	▼7.8	

- Trevor Shonk, elected as a Conservative, joined the Thanet Independents in March 2024.
- Mike Whiting was suspended from the Conservatives in March 2024, after which he sat as an independent.

=== Swanscombe and Greenhithe ===
Swanscombe and Greenhithe By-Election 21 Nov 2024
Party	Candidate	Votes	%	±%
Reform	Thomas Mallon	695	29.1	+27.5
Labour Co-op	Victoria Akintomide-Akinwamide	588	24.6	−7.5
Residents	Dawn Johnston	395	16.5	−23.9
Conservative	Carol Gale	374	15.6	−10.3
Green	Laura Edie	296	12.4	N/A
Liberal Democrats	James Willis	44	1.8	N/A
Majority		107	4.5	−3.8
Turnout		2392	15	
Reform gain from Residents		Swing	▲25.7	

By-election held after the death of Swanscombe and Greenhithe Residents’ Association Cllr Peter Harman.
