= Linden Kemkaran =

British politician (born 1970)

Leader of Kent County Council
- Incumbent
- Assumed office 22 May 2025
- Preceded by: Roger Gough

Councillor for Maidstone South East
- Incumbent
- Assumed office 1 May 2025

Leader of Reform UK on Kent County Council
- Incumbent
- Assumed office May 2025

Personal details
- Born: Linden Mary Kemkaran; 1970 (age 55–56) Dartford, England
- Party: Reform UK
- Other political affiliations: Conservative (previously)
- Education: University of Surrey
- Occupation: Politician

Linden Mary Kemkaran (born 1970) is a British Reform UK politician. She has been the leader of Kent County Council since May 2025.

== Biography ==
Kemkaran was born in Dartford to an Indo-Trinidadian father and an English mother from Waltham Cross. Kemkaran previously worked for BBC News in a number of roles. She attended the University of Surrey. She has written articles for The Spectator.

Before joining Reform UK, she was a member of the Conservative Party. In the 2019 United Kingdom general election, she was shortlisted for selection in Orpington but was not selected. She stood in Bradford East, but came second behind incumbent Imran Hussain. Following the election, she was investigated by the Conservative Party for "Islamophobic retweets". During the COVID-19 pandemic, she was involved in the Invicta Summer Academy.

== Leadership of Kent County Council ==
The 2025 UK local elections were held on 1 May 2025, with the Kent County Council election seeing all 81 seats up for election. Kemkaran stood as the Reform UK candidate for the Maidstone South East division, winning the seat with a 51.3% majority, on a voter turnout of 23.2%. The wider election saw Reform win outright control of the council for the first time, taking 57 of the council's 81 seats, ending almost 30 years on Conservative council control. Despite never having previously served as a councillor, on 8 May, Kemkaran was chosen by Reform UK to be the next leader of Kent County Council.

After being elected, Kemkaran said "we will simply put the people of Kent at the heart of everything we do". One key policy is a new cabinet role inspired by the US Department of Government Efficiency (DOGE), as promoted by Elon Musk. The council will not fly the rainbow flag for Pride Month. She said she saw having a Ukrainian flag in the council chamber as a "distraction". She also said she intends to reduce the impact of illegal migration on residents in Kent.

On 18 October 2025, The Guardian newspaper released video footage of a Kent County Council Reform group online meeting where Kemkaran berated members by shouting and swearing at some of her colleagues after they criticised what they saw as her failure to involve backbench councillors in her decision-making as regards local government reform, and threatened to mute one councillor for asking a question. In response, Kemkaran described the leak as an act of "treachery", calling those responsible as "weak" and "cowards", and announced a hunt to find those who leaked the video. On 20 October, four councillors were suspended from the Reform party group.

The controversy provoked seven MPs with constituencies in Kent to write a letter to the Reform party leader Nigel Farage, describing the council as "ridden with chaos and in-fighting", calling for Kemkaran's replacement. On 22 October, Kemkaran called on her fellow Reform councillors to sign a statement of support, pledging their "full confidence in [their] leader, Cllr Linden Kemkaran", with the statement describing her as leading "the council with courage, integrity and discipline.” Between 25 and 27 October, five councillors were expelled from the Reform party.

The suspensions and expulsions since video footage of the council group meeting was published, combined with previous defections or suspensions of Reform UK council members, meant that, under Kemkaran's council leadership, the number of Reform UK councillors fell from 57 councillors after the 1 May 2025 election, to 48 councillors as of 28 October 2025. In January 2026, she proposed a 3.99% increase in council tax.

== Views ==
Kemkaran is a supporter of grammar schools, which still exist throughout Kent. She supports government intervention in the debate over mobile phones in schools, but stops short of a ban.
