= 2023 Swale Borough Council election =

2023 English local election

- 4 May 2023

All 47 seats to Swale Borough Council 24 seats needed for a majority

	First party	Second party	Third party
Leader	Roger Truelove	Alan Horton	Mike Baldock
Party	Labour	Conservative	Swale Ind.
Last election	11 seats, 23.7%	16 seats, 34.1%	10 seats, 20.1%
Seats before	9	15 (Note: Includes one vacant seat at Queenborough and Halfway ward formerly held by Conservative councillor Cameron Beart until his death in January 2023.)	8
Seats after	15	12	11
Seat change	▲4	▼4	▲1
Percentage	25.0%	30.4%	17.2%
	Fourth party	Fifth party	Sixth party
Leader	Ben Martin	Tim Valentine
Party	Liberal Democrats	Green	Independent
Last election	5 seats, 9.7%	2 seats, 5.7%	2 seats, 4.6%
Seats before	4	2	8 (Note: Of the eight independent councillors before the election, four sat together as the "Independent Group" led by Monique Bonney, three formed the "Independents First" group led by Richard Darby and the other (Simon Fowle) did not belong to a group.)
Seats after	5	3	1
Seat change	Steady	▲1	▼1
Percentage	13.0%	8.6%	4.2%
	Seventh party
Party	Reform
Last election	N/A
Seats before	1
Seats after	0
Seat change	N/A
Percentage	1.0%
- The winner of each seat by party in the 2023 Swale Borough Council Election
Leader before election
Mike Baldock
Swale Independents
No overall control
Leader after election
Tim Gibson
Labour
No overall control

The 2023 Swale Borough Council election took place on 4 May 2023 to elect members of Swale Borough Council in Kent, England. This was on the same day as other local elections across England.

The council was under no overall control prior to the election. The Conservatives were the largest party, but the council was being run by a rainbow coalition of all the other main parties, led by Mike Baldock of local party the Swale Independents. The council remained under no overall control after the election, and Labour overtook the Conservatives to become the largest party. A new coalition of Labour, the Swale Independents and Greens formed. The new Labour group leader, Tim Gibson, was appointed leader of the council at the subsequent annual council meeting on 17 May 2023, with Mike Baldock becoming deputy leader.

== Summary ==
=== Election result ===
2023 Swale Borough Council election
Party	Candidates	Seats	Gains	Losses	Net gain/loss	Seats %	Votes %	Votes	+/−
Labour	31	15	6	0	▲6	31.92%	24.97%	13,738	▲1.57%
Conservative	44	12	3	7	▼4	25.53%	30.36%	16,703	▼4.24%
Swale Ind.	15	11	3	1	▲2	23.4%	17.18%	9,449	▼2.72%
Liberal Democrats	22	5	1	0	▲1	10.64%	12.96%	7,127	▲3.36%
Green	13	3	1	0	▲1	6.38%	8.58%	4,722	▲2.88%
Independent	7	1	0	5	▼5	2.13%	4.18%	2,301	▼0.42%
Reform	4	0	0	1	▼1	0%	1.04%	569	New
Heritage	1	0	0	0	0	0%	0.44%	240	New
Monster Raving Loony	1	0	0	0	0	0%	0.29%	161	▼0.31%

== Ward results ==
The Statement of Persons Nominated, which details the candidates standing in each ward, was released by Swale Borough Council following the close of nominations on 4 April 2023. The results for each ward were as follows:

=== Abbey ===
Abbey
Party	Candidate	Votes	%	±%
Liberal Democrats	Hannah Perkin*	918	63.2	+18
Liberal Democrats	Chris Williams	807	55.6	+18
Labour	Trevor Payne	314	21.6	+4
Conservative	Jay Brown	276	19.0	+1
Labour Co-op	Frances Rehal	261	18.0	+4
Conservative	Melanie Regan-Brown	244	16.8	±0
Turnout		1,452		
Liberal Democrats hold				
Liberal Democrats hold				

=== Bobbing, Iwade and Lower Halstow ===
Bobbing, Iwade & Lower Halstow (2 seats)
Party	Candidate	Votes	%	±%
Swale Ind.	Lloyd Chapman	501	39.3	−20
Conservative	Rog Clark*	483	37.9	−1
Labour	Olufemi Olukoya	401	31.5	+11
Conservative	Gareth Randall	343	26.9	−3
Liberal Democrats	Marc Wilson	267	21.0	N/A
Green	Carol Goatham	236	18.5	N/A
Majority				
Turnout		1,274		
Swale Ind. hold		Swing		
Conservative hold		Swing		

=== Borden and Grove Park ===
Borden & Grove Park (2 seats)
Party	Candidate	Votes	%	±%
Swale Ind.	Mike Baldock*	1,030	71.5	−8
Swale Ind.	Ann Cavanagh	728	50.5	N/A
Conservative	Nicholas Hampshire*	424	29.4	−5
Conservative	Conor Dobbs	262	18.2	N/A
Labour	Martin Singer	184	12.8	−15
Majority				
Turnout		1,441		
Swale Ind. hold		Swing		
Swale Ind. gain from Conservative		Swing		

=== Boughton and Courtenay ===
Boughton & Courtenay (2 seats)
Party	Candidate	Votes	%	±%
Green	Rich Lehmann	1,123	61.9	+22
Green	Alastair Gould*	1,122	61.9	+18
Conservative	Piers Baker	392	21.6	−8
Conservative	Oliver Lane	346	19.1	−1
Swale Ind.	Jeff Tutt	278	15.3	−18
Liberal Democrats	Sonia Fox	102	5.6	N/A
Liberal Democrats	Ida Linfield	77	4.2	N/A
Majority		730		
Turnout		1,814		
Green hold		Swing		
Green hold		Swing		

=== Chalkwell ===
Chalkwell
Party	Candidate	Votes	%	±%
Labour	Charlie Miller	298	55.3	−13.0
Conservative	Richard Allsep	173	32.1	+0.4
Green	Hannah Temple	68	12.6	N/A
Majority				
Turnout		539		
Labour hold		Swing		

=== East Downs ===
East Downs
Party	Candidate	Votes	%	±%
Green	Terry Thompson	423	45.9	+28.7
Conservative	David Simmons*	389	42.2	−3.7
Liberal Democrats	Stephen Fisher	110	11.9	+3.1
Majority				
Turnout		922		
Green gain from Conservative		Swing		

=== Hartlip, Newington and Upchurch ===
Hartlip, Newington & Upchurch (2 seats)
Party	Candidate	Votes	%	±%
Swale Ind.	Richard Palmer*	943	58.8	−4
Swale Ind.	Chris Palmer	879	54.8	N/A
Conservative	Alan Horton*	513	32.0	−4
Conservative	Asha Saroy	336	20.9	−12
Labour	Margaret Cooper	279	17.4	±0
Majority				
Turnout		1,605		
Swale Ind. hold		Swing		
Swale Ind. gain from Conservative		Swing		

=== Homewood ===
Homewood (2 seats)
Party	Candidate	Votes	%	±%
Labour	Simon Clark*	511	38.2	−26
Labour	Shelley Cheesman	483	36.2	−35
Swale Ind.	Jason Clinch	395	29.6	N/A
Conservative	Danielle Hoynes	343	25.7	±0
Conservative	John Wright	340	25.4	−3
Heritage	Thomas Lee	240	18.0	N/A
Liberal Democrats	Frances Stennings	166	12.4	N/A
Majority				
Turnout		1,336		
Labour hold		Swing		
Labour hold		Swing		

=== Kemsley ===
Kemsley (2 seats)
Party	Candidate	Votes	%	±%
Swale Ind.	Derek Carnell*	476	47.7	−2
Labour	Ashley Wise	357	35.8	+12
Conservative	Sue Gent	356	35.7	+6
Conservative	Mike Dendor*	322	32.3	−6
Liberal Democrats	Tony Clark	236	23.7	+6
Majority				
Turnout		997		
Swale Ind. hold		Swing		
Labour gain from Conservative		Swing		

=== Milton Regis ===
Milton Regis (2 seats)
Party	Candidate	Votes	%	±%
Labour	Anthony Winckless*	674	65.4	+13
Labour	Angelica Valls	559	54.2	+18
Swale Ind.	Stephen Davey*	303	29.4	−7
Conservative	David Danaher	186	18.0	−2
Conservative	Stuart Williams	166	16.1	+2
Majority				
Turnout		1,031		
Labour hold		Swing		
Labour gain from Swale Ind.		Swing		

=== Minster Cliffs ===
Minster Cliffs (3 seats)
Party	Candidate	Votes	%	±%
Swale Ind.	Tom Nundy	656	40.5	−12
Conservative	Andy Booth	561	34.6	±0
Conservative	Ken Ingleton*	554	34.2	−2
Conservative	Hollie Bolitho	466	28.7	−10
Independent	Richard Darby*	457	28.2	−25
Labour	Libby Tucker	396	24.4	+7
Green	Josie Galvin	276	17.0	−6
Reform	Will Fotheringham-Bray	163	10.1	N/A
Majority				
Turnout		1,621		
Swale Ind. gain from Independent		Swing		
Conservative hold		Swing		
Conservative hold		Swing		

=== Murston ===
Murston (2 seats)
Party	Candidate	Votes	%	±%
Swale Ind.	James Hall*	593	57.7	+1
Labour	Mark Last	397	38.6	+15
Conservative	Ann Hampshire*	211	20.5	−4
Conservative	Glen Le Grys	171	16.6	N/A
Liberal Democrats	Alexander Stennings	139	13.5	+4
Liberal Democrats	Mary Zeng	127	12.4	N/A
Green	Miriam Layton	119	11.6	N/A
Majority				
Turnout		1,028		
Swale Ind. hold		Swing		
Labour gain from Conservative		Swing		

=== Priory ===
Priory
Party	Candidate	Votes	%	±%
Liberal Democrats	Michael Henderson	394	54.6	+3.8
Conservative	Andy Culham	174	24.1	−5.0
Labour	Rob Crayford	98	13.6	+1.9
Green	Sonia Jackson	55	7.6	+0.1
Majority				
Turnout		721		
Liberal Democrats hold		Swing		

=== Queenborough and Halfway ===
Queenborough & Halfway (3 seats)
Party	Candidate	Votes	%	±%
Labour	Ashley Shiel	603	40.6	+7
Conservative	Peter Marchington*	586	39.5	−7
Conservative	Mike Whiting	522	35.2	−19
Labour	Donna Boakes	508	34.2	+4
Conservative	Bailey Allison	498	33.5	−11
Labour	Jordan Hartley	462	31.1	N/A
Swale Ind.	Lorraine St. John	293	19.7	N/A
Liberal Democrats	Linda Brinklow	227	15.3	N/A
Majority				
Turnout		1,485		
Labour gain from Conservative		Swing		
Conservative hold		Swing		
Conservative hold		Swing		

=== Roman ===
Roman (2 seats)
Party	Candidate	Votes	%	±%
Labour	Tim Gibson*	652	58.6	+1
Labour	Karen Watson	535	48.1	−5
Conservative	Mark Quinton	300	27.0	−14
Conservative	Alfred Okotie	266	23.9	−7
Green	Debra Blacklock	167	15.0	N/A
Liberal Democrats	Rosemary Madgwick	134	12.0	N/A
Majority				
Turnout		1,113		
Labour hold		Swing		
Labour hold		Swing		

=== Sheerness ===
Sheerness (3 seats)
Party	Candidate	Votes	%	±%
Labour	Angela Harrison*	727	52.9	+9
Labour	Hayden Brawn	612	44.5	+6
Labour	Dolley White	573	41.7	+6
Conservative	Patricia Rogers	394	28.7	+6
Independent	Lee McCall*	382	27.8	−18
Reform	Jeffrey Williams	205	14.9	N/A
Majority				
Turnout		1,374		
Labour gain from Independent		Swing		
Labour hold		Swing		
Labour gain from Conservative		Swing		

=== Sheppey Central ===
Sheppey Central (3 seas)
Party	Candidate	Votes	%	±%
Swale Ind.	Elliott Jayes*	794	51.7	−10
Conservative	Peter Neal*	409	26.6	−1
Conservative	Mark Tucker	389	25.3	−5
Labour	Ian Edworthy	362	23.6	+3
Conservative	Oliver Eakin	360	23.4	+3
Labour	Alan Henley	333	21.7	N/A
Independent	Peter MacDonald*	298	19.4	−11
Green	Sam Banks	200	13.0	−10
Liberal Democrats	Edward Currie	200	13.0	N/A
Monster Raving Loony	Mad Mike Young	161	10.5	−9
Majority				
Turnout		1,537		
Swale Ind. hold		Swing		
Conservative hold		Swing		
Conservative gain from Independent		Swing		

=== Sheppey East ===
Sheppey East (2 seats)
Party	Candidate	Votes	%	±%
Conservative	Lee-Anne Moore	347	34.8	+2
Conservative	Tara Noe	315	31.6	+3
Labour	Matt Wheatcroft	226	22.7	+7
Independent	Pat Sandle	215	21.6	N/A
Independent	Gaynor Bidgood	191	19.2	N/A
Green	David Walton	129	13.0	N/A
Reform	Mini Nissanga*	108	10.8	−26
Independent	Bill Tatton*	103	10.3	−31
Majority				
Turnout		996		
Conservative gain from Independent		Swing		
Conservative gain from Reform		Swing		

=== St Ann's ===
St Ann's (2 seats)
Party	Candidate	Votes	%	±%
Labour	Carole Jackson*	846	48.4	+7
Labour	Kieran Golding	765	43.7	+7
Liberal Democrats	Charles Gibson	448	25.6	−4
Liberal Democrats	Josh Rowlands	444	25.4	−1
Conservative	Ben Fisher	398	22.8	−11
Conservative	Frankie O'Brien	363	20.8	−8
Reform	Seb Arrowsmith-Brown	93	5.3	N/A
Majority				
Turnout		1,749		
Labour hold		Swing		
Labour hold		Swing		

=== Teynham and Lynsted ===
Teynham & Lynsted (2 seats)
Party	Candidate	Votes	%	±%
Conservative	Lloyd Bowen*	764	54.1	+12
Conservative	Julien Speed	666	47.1	+14
Green	Janet Bott	506	35.8	+17
Labour	Georgina Jessiman	344	24.3	+7
Liberal Democrats	Dorothee Barker	135	9.6	N/A
Liberal Democrats	Carol Morris	113	8.0	−1
Majority				
Turnout		1,413		
Conservative hold		Swing		
Conservative hold		Swing		

=== The Meads ===
The Meads
Party	Candidate	Votes	%	±%
Conservative	James Hunt*	395	68.2	+12.0
Liberal Democrats	Shaun Wakelen	184	31.8	N/A
Majority				
Turnout		579		
Conservative hold		Swing		

=== Watling ===
Watling (2 seats)
Party	Candidate	Votes	%	±%
Liberal Democrats	Ben Martin*	1,009	51.7	−7
Liberal Democrats	Claire Martin	830	42.5	−14
Conservative	Jack Goodenough	496	25.4	−5
Conservative	Jess Valentine	465	23.8	−3
Labour	Robert Newman	350	17.9	+4
Labour	James Scott	300	15.4	N/A
Green	Oliver Heyen	298	15.3	N/A
Majority				
Turnout		1,952		
Liberal Democrats hold		Swing		
Liberal Democrats hold		Swing		

=== West Downs ===
West Downs
Party	Candidate	Votes	%	±%
Independent	Monique Bonney*	655	75.3	−11.6
Conservative	Margaret Benford	155	17.8	+4.7
Liberal Democrats	Kris Barker	60	6.9	N/A
Majority				
Turnout		870		
Independent hold		Swing		

=== Woodstock ===
Woodstock (2 seats)
Party	Candidate	Votes	%	±%
Swale Ind.	Sarah Stephen*	830	53.8	
Swale Ind.	Paul Stephen*	750	48.6	
Conservative	Lee Burgess	584	37.9	
Labour	James Beer	328	21.3	
Majority				
Turnout		1,542		
Swale Ind. hold		Swing		
Swale Ind. hold		Swing		

== Changes 2023–present ==
- On 11 October 2023, Cllr Ann Cavanagh (Borden and Grove Park) left the Swale Independents to join the Labour group.
- In March 2024, Cllr Mike Whiting (Queenborough and Halfway) was suspended by the Conservative Party after being convicted of drink-driving, and has since sat as an independent.
- On 7 February 2025, four Swale Independents councillors — Richard Palmer and Christine Palmer (Hartlip, Newington and Upchurch), Lloyd Chapman (Bobbing, Iwade and Lower Halstow) and Peter MacDonald (Minster Cliffs) — defected to Reform UK.

=== By-elections ===
==== Minster Cliffs ====
The Minster Cliffs by-election was triggered by the death of Conservative councillor Ken Ingleton in July 2023.

Minster Cliffs by-election, 14 September 2023
Party	Candidate	Votes	%	±%
Swale Ind.	Peter MacDonald	395	35.8	+17.2
Labour	Edward Baldwin	339	30.7	+19.5
Conservative	Oliver Eakin	331	30.0	−14.8
Liberal Democrats	Ernest Currie	39	3.5	N/A
Majority		56	5.1	
Turnout		1,104	17.9	
Swale Ind. gain from Conservative		Swing		

==== Abbey ====
A by-election was held after Liberal Democrat councillor Chris Williams resigned from the council on 23 October 2023.

Abbey by-election: 14 December 2023
Party	Candidate	Votes	%	±%
Liberal Democrats	Charles Gibson	435	44.8	−16.4
Green	Carol Goatham	173	17.8	N/A
Labour	Rob Crayford	172	17.7	−2.7
Conservative	Andy Culham	154	15.9	−2.5
Reform	William Fotheringham-Bray	36	3.7	N/A
Majority		262	27.0	
Turnout		970	24.6	
Registered electors		4,105		
Liberal Democrats hold		Swing		

==== Priory ====
Priory by-election triggered by the death of Liberal Democrat councillor Michael Henderson.

Priory: 3 September 2024
Party	Candidate	Votes	%	±%
Liberal Democrats	Alex Eyre	316	42.5	–12.1
Reform	Jess Valentine	200	26.9	N/A
Conservative	Jack Goodenough	153	20.6	–3.5
Labour	John Griffin	74	10.0	–3.6
Majority		116	15.6	
Turnout		745	29.3	
Registered electors		2,543		
Liberal Democrats hold				

==== Murston ====
Murston by-election triggered by the disqualification of Swale Independents councillor James Hall.

Murston: 21 November 2024
Party	Candidate	Votes	%	±%
Swale Ind.	Carrie Pollard	269	34.5	–6.1
Labour	Rakel Eseku	229	29.4	+2.2
Reform	Ian Bobbett	139	17.8	N/A
Conservative	Mariusz Bencych	116	14.9	+0.4
Liberal Democrats	Alexander Stennings	26	3.3	–6.2
Majority		40	5.1	N/A
Turnout		779		
Swale Ind. hold				

==== Milton Regis ====
Milton Regis by-election triggered by the resignation of Labour councillor Angelica Valls.

Milton Regis: 19 December 2024
Party	Candidate	Votes	%	±%
Reform	Kieran Mishchuk	272	33.9	N/A
Swale Ind.	Tom Lee	208	25.9	–0.2
Labour	Nicola Nelson	200	24.9	–33.1
Conservative	Islay Walker	99	12.3	–3.7
Liberal Democrats	Marc Wilson	23	2.9	N/A
Majority		64	8.0	N/A
Turnout		802		
Reform gain from Labour				
