= Tony Hart (politician) =

British businessman and politician (1923–2009)

- Born: 11 September 1923; Portsmouth, England
- Died: 13 June 2009 (aged 85); Kent
- Education: Bedford Modern School

Tony Hart CBE (11 September 1923 – 13 June 2009) was a British businessman and Conservative leader of Kent County Council between 1984 and 1992. During his leadership of Kent County Council, Hart negotiated and oversaw the development of the Channel Tunnel, the High Speed Rail Link and the Dartford Bridge.

== Early life ==
Anthony Harry Hart was born on 11 September 1923 in Portsmouth. He spent much of his early childhood in Africa and was educated as a boarder at Bedford Modern School.

During World War II he served with the Parachute Regiment in India and Burma before leaving as an acting major.

== Business career ==
After World War II, Hart became a chartered accountant with a firm that was eventually merged into Touche Ross. In the mid-1960s, he incorporated a property company, Hawker Homes, which he eventually sold to Christian Salvesen in 1973, establishing his financial independence.

== Political career ==
Hart was first elected to Kent County Council in 1975 as a Conservative advocating a 'businesslike approach' to local affairs and 'less bureaucratic interference' in the lives of his constituents. He was chairman of the council's planning and transportation committee from 1980 to 1984 before being elected leader.

After becoming leader of the council, Hart was integral in establishing the Kent Foundation, a charity to help constituents of Kent who had a business idea but lacked the financial or professional support to bring it to effect. In 1994, through his contact with Sir Angus Ogilvy, Hart was able to join the Kent Foundation with The Prince's Trust so that 'the two organisations could deliver the same programme with the benefit of their combined resources'. Hart was chairman of the joint operating board in Kent, and 'the Prince of Wales showed his appreciation with a present to him of a pair of cufflinks and a signed photograph'.

During his tenure, Kent successfully implemented significant engineering projects such as the Channel Tunnel, Eurostar and the Dartford Bridge. In a then groundbreaking attempt to move financial power back as far as possible to those closest to the responsibility they managed, Kent was the first county to transfer financial responsibility directly to school head teachers.

In 1991 Hart was appointed CBE for services to Kent.

== Personal life ==
Hart was interested in fly-fishing, walking and sailing. He met his wife, Wendy English, on a skiing holiday in Kandersteg, Switzerland, in February 1955, and 'told her three days later that he intended to marry her'; they were married ten months later. He died in Kent on 13 June 2009 and his wife and daughter survived him; a son died in 2008.

Preceded by Bobby Neame	Leader of Kent County Council; 1984–1992	Succeeded by Brenda Trench
