= Swale Independents =

- Leader: Mike Baldock
- Founded: 21 May 2018; 8 years ago
- Headquarters: 24 Station Road, Newington, Sittingbourne, Kent, ME9 7JS
- Ideology: Localism
- Political position: Centre-right
- Colours: Orange; Green
- Slogan: "Putting Local People First"
- Kent County Council: 0 / 81
- Swale Borough Council: 8 / 47

Website
- www.swaleindependentsalliance.org

The Swale Independents are a local political party based in the borough of Swale. It was founded in 2018 by the former leader of UKIP on Swale Borough Council, Mike Baldock.

They sit together with one independent on Swale Borough Council as "The Swale Independents Alliance".

== History ==
At the 2019 Swale Borough Council election, the party elected ten councillors. After the election, a "rainbow coalition" of the Swale Independents, Labour, Liberal Democrats, independents, and the Greens, was formed. This ended 17 years of Conservative control of the council.

In 2020, the party's leader, Mike Baldock, faced criticism for opposing new houses being built, despite being a landlord who owns three houses, and an acre of land, worth £1 million in total.

At the 2021 Kent County Council election, Baldock won a seat, becoming the party's sole representative on the council.

From April 2022 to May 2023, Baldock served as Swale Borough Council's leader.

At the 2023 Swale Borough Council election, the party won 11 council seats. Afterwards, they formed another coalition with Labour and the Greens.

In December 2023, Baldock resigned as deputy leader of Swale Borough Council, after a disagreement with the Labour group. He returned to the role just two weeks later.

In March 2024, Baldock was selected as the party's candidate for Sittingbourne and Sheppey in the 2024 general election. He came fourth with 7.9% of the vote.

In February 2025, four borough councillors left the party to join Reform UK, citing their fear that the UK is "heading for a Labour-run dictatorship". Mike Baldock called the move "a huge betrayal of the people who voted for them" and suggested that the defectors should resign and contest by-elections as Reform candidates.

== Principles ==
The party supports Swale Borough Council changing from a cabinet system to a committee structure. It opposes whipping and the prioritisation of partisan interests over local people.
