= Kent County Council =

British administrative authority

- Coat of arms

- Council logo

Type
- Type: Non-metropolitan county

Leadership
- Chairman: Jeremy Eustace, Reform UK since 21 May 2026
- Leader: Linden Kemkaran, Reform UK since 22 May 2025
- Chief Executive: Amanda Beer since July 2023

Structure
- Seats: 81 councillors
- Political groups: Administration (47) Reform (47) Other parties (34) Liberal Democrat (12) Restore (7) Conservative (5) Green (5) Labour (2) Better Way Of (1) Independent (2)
- Length of term: 4 years

Elections
- Voting system: First-past-the-post
- First election: January 1889
- Last election: 1 May 2025

Meeting place
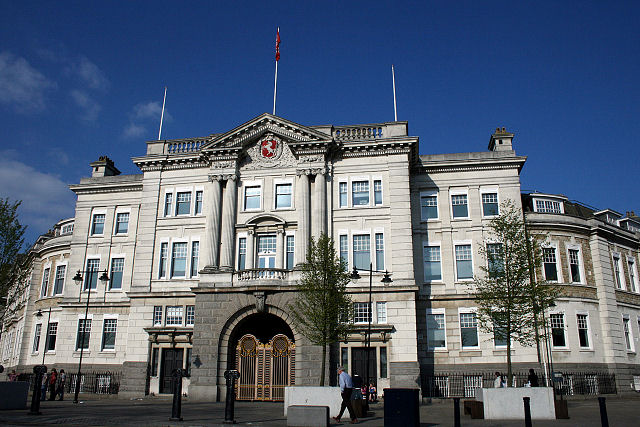
- County Hall, County Road, Maidstone, ME14 1XQ

Website
- www.kent.gov.uk

Kent County Council (KCC) is a county council that governs the non-metropolitan county of Kent in England. The non-metropolitan county is smaller than the ceremonial county, which additionally includes the unitary authority of Medway. Kent County Council is the upper tier of elected local government, below which are 12 district councils, and around 300 town and parish councils. The county council has 81 elected councillors.

It is one of the largest local authorities in England in terms of population served and the largest local authority of its type. (Note: With a population of 1,576,100 at the 2021 census, Kent is the most populous non-metropolitan county in a two tier arrangement.) The council is based at County Hall in Maidstone. The council has been under Reform UK majority control since 2025.

== History ==
Under the Local Government Act 1888, Kent County Council was one of several created the following year. At the time, the administrative county differed from the historic county.

Following the initial elections and appointment of county aldermen, the council came into being on 1 April 1889, on which day it held its first official meeting at the Sessions House in Maidstone. With Lord Brabourne in the chair, Sir John Farnaby Lennard was elected as the first chairman of the council.

=== Boundary changes ===
The county council's duties at first were few, but gradually it absorbed school boards, the rural highway boards and the boards of guardians. The county council adopted the Sessions House as its meeting place.

In 1965, the London Government Act 1963 abolished the existing county of London and replaced it with a larger administrative area called Greater London, which took over the Bexley and Bromley areas from the administrative county of Kent. In 1974, the Local Government Act 1972 saw Kent re-classified as a non-metropolitan county and it gained the formerly independent county borough of Canterbury. Until 1974, the lower tier of local government had comprised numerous boroughs, urban districts and rural districts. As part of the 1974 reforms, the lower tier was reorganised into fourteen non-metropolitan districts.

In 1998, the districts of Gillingham and Rochester-upon-Medway were removed from the non-metropolitan county of Kent to become a new unitary authority called Medway, whilst remaining part of the ceremonial county of Kent.

=== Local government reorganisation ===
In December 2024, deputy prime minister Angela Rayner announced proposals for local government reorganisation (LGR).

In February 2026, KCC and Medway Council held a residents' LGR consultation regarding the abolition of the 14 existing councils and replacement with several larger unitary authorities; layouts of both three and four councils were proposed.

In July 2026, it was confirmed that in April 2028, Kent would be reconstituted into four unitary authorities. Elections for the four new shadow councils (North Kent, West Kent, Mid Kent and East Kent) will be held in April 2027, with the new councils taking charge in April 2028.

=== Reform UK administration (2025–) ===
In the 2025 Kent County Council election, Reform UK won outright control of the council and Linden Kemkaran was elected leader. After being elected she said "we will simply put the people of Kent at the heart of everything we do".

One key policy is a new cabinet role, held by Gravesham Councillor Matthew Fraser Moat, inspired by the Department of Government Efficiency (DOGE) as promoted by Elon Musk.

The council will not fly the rainbow flag for Pride Month. Kemkaran said she saw having a Ukrainian flag in the council chamber as a "distraction". Kemkaran also said she intends to reduce the impact of illegal migration on residents in Kent.

In July 2025, Kemkaran shared a social media post claiming Reform had removed books containing transgender themes from the county's libraries with immediate effect. This was later found to be untrue with the challenged book simply moved from a display at the entrance to an adult section. Kent Libraries went on to post a statement that they would no longer allow displays of transgender books to be in areas accessible by children.

In November 2026, after allegations of sexual misconduct against David Walliams were published, KCC said they would not be removing his titles from its libraries. The decision drew criticism from opposition members including from Independent councillor Sarah Hudson, who expressed her "surprise," "given that the publisher has severed ties with David Walliams and major booksellers are withdrawing his books." The deputy leader of Reform KCC, Sarah Forthergill, responded by saying that decisions on books were made based on "evidence and clear library policies".

==== Suspensions and defections ====
In August 2025, Cliftonville councillor Daniel Taylor was suspended from the party after threatening to kill his wife. Councillor Amelia Randall defected from Reform UK to UKIP the following month, but in March 2026 left UKIP to establish her own party, Better Way Of.

In October 2025, councillor Robert Ford was suspended from Reform UK after allegations of misconduct from several women. In the same month, the council faced scrutiny after leaked footage of an August meeting showed Kemkaran shouting down other councillors using profanities, apparently over disagreements regarding the council's response to national plans for local government reform. Kemkaran said those who leaked the video were "weak" and "foolish", and accused them of "treachery". On 20 October, Reform UK announced that four councillors were being suspended: Paul Thomas, Oliver Bradshaw, Bill Barrett and Maxine Fothergill. On 27 October, Barrett, Bradshaw, Ford and Thomas, plus Brian Black, were expelled from Reform UK.

On 29 October 2025, Barrett announced a new KCC grouping named the Independent Reformers or Independent Reform Group, consisting of him and Ford; Bradshaw, Black and Thomas continued to support Reform UK and said they would not join the group. On 5 November, councillor Isabella Kemp was listed as an independent on the KCC website, having left Reform UK 10 hours before KCC was to meet. On 8 January 2026, she announced that she had joined the Independent Reformers, after being in talks to join the Liberal Democrats. On 18 February 2026, Black, Bradshaw, Ford, Fothergill, Kemp and Thomas, plus Dean Burns, joined Restore Britain, making it the third largest party on the Council.

==== By-election ====
On 9 April 2026, the Greens won the Cliftonville by-election, with Rob Yates replacing imprisoned councillor Daniel Taylor, as a Green gain from Reform.

== Council structure ==
Cabinet members

Leadership
- Leader: Linden Kemkaran
- Deputy leader: Brian Collins
- Adult Social Care and Public Health: Diane Morton
- Community and Regulatory Services: Paul Webb
- Local Government Efficiency: Chris Hespe
- Economic Development and Special Projects: David Wimble
- Education and Skills: Beverley Fordham
- Environment, Coastal Regeneration and Special Projects: Paul King
- Integrated Children's Services: Christine Palmer
- Highways and Transport: Peter Osborne

The council is structured as follows:

=== Cabinet ===
The cabinet is made up of ten county councillors, all members of Reform UK. The cabinet meets monthly and makes decisions collectively, its current composition is visible in the infobox.

=== County council ===
The County Council is made up of 81 elected county councillors. The full council meets seven times yearly to agree the council's Constitution and amendments to it, is responsible for appointment of the Leader and approval of the policy framework and budget (including the level of Council Tax).

=== Local boards ===
Local boards are local community groups that hold regular public meetings across Kent. They also allocate funding to local projects. There are 12 local boards in Kent, and every county councillor is required to be a member of one local board.

== Governance ==
Kent County Council provides county-level services. District-level services are provided by the twelve district councils:

- Ashford Borough Council
- Canterbury City Council
- Dartford Borough Council
- Dover District Council
- Folkestone and Hythe District Council
- Gravesham Borough Council
- Maidstone Borough Council
- Sevenoaks District Council
- Swale Borough Council
- Thanet District Council
- Tonbridge and Malling Borough Council
- Tunbridge Wells Borough Council

Much of the county is also covered by civil parishes, which form a third tier of local government.

=== Political control ===
The county council has been under Reform UK majority control since 2025.

Political control of the council since the 1974 reforms has been as follows:

Party in control	Years
Conservative	1974–1993
No overall control	1993–1997
Conservative	1997–2025
Reform	2025–Present

=== Leadership ===
The leaders of the council since 1974 have been:

Councillor	Party	From	To	Notes
John Grugeon	Conservative	1974	1982	
Bobby Neame	Conservative	1982	1984	
Tony Hart	Conservative	1984	1992	
Brenda Trench	Conservative	1992	1993	
Jim Little	Labour	1993	1994	Joint leaders
Alison Wainman	Liberal Democrats	1993	1994	Joint leaders
John Ovenden	Labour	1994	1997	Joint leaders
Alison Wainman	Liberal Democrats	1994	1997	Joint leaders
Sandy Bruce-Lockhart	Conservative	May 1997	12 Oct 2005	
Paul Carter	Conservative	12 Oct 2005	17 Oct 2019	
Roger Gough	Conservative	17 Oct 2019	May 2025	
Linden Kemkaran	Reform	22 May 2025		

=== Composition ===
The current council was formed after the 2025 election. Since then, eight Reform UK councillors have been suspended and/or expelled from the party; seven former Reform UK councillors have joined Restore Britain.

Of the two Independent councillors, Swale East councillor Rich Lehmann - originally elected as a Green councillor - continues to sit with the Green group, and Ashford Rural South councillor Bill Barrett sits with the Conservative group, having originally been elected as a Reform UK councillor.

Until April 2026 there was a vacancy in the Cliftonville division following the conviction and imprisonment of former councillor Daniel Taylor.

Cllr Amelia Randall for the Birchington and Rural division, originally elected as Reform UK, defected to UKIP, then left to form her own party Better Way Of.

Party	Councillors		
Party	Elected	Current	Difference
Reform	57	47	▼10
Liberal Democrats	12	12	Steady
Restore	0	7	▲7
Conservative	5	5	Steady
Green	5	5	Steady
Labour	2	2	Steady
Independent	0	2	▲2
Better Way Of	0	1	▲1
Total	81	81	Steady

The next local elections (likely for three or four unitary authorities) are due in 2027.

=== Elections ===
Since the last boundary changes in 2019 the council has comprised 81 councillors representing 72 electoral divisions, with each division electing one or two councillors. Elections are held every four years.

=== Premises ===
The council is based at County Hall, a complex of buildings on County Road in Maidstone which incorporates the old Sessions House of 1824, which had been the meeting place of the quarter sessions which preceded the county council. The council has various other buildings around the county as well.

== Responsibilities and directorates ==
The council is responsible for public services such as education, transport, strategic planning, emergency services, social services, public safety and waste disposal.

=== Transport ===

Kent Top Travel, established in 2005, was owned by Kent County Council. It operated the council's bus network and a coach charter fleet. The majority of its route portfolio comprised rural, evening and Sunday services won under competitive tender from KCC and other local authorities in open competition with private bus operators. Kent Top Travel operated Canterbury City Council's park & ride service from October 2008 until 2013. Buses were painted in a white and green livery; the Canterbury park & ride fleet was silver and green. Coaches were painted both white and red, and yellow. Following an independent report criticising KCC's trading companies, in December 2012 it was decided to close Kent Top Travel once its existing contracts expired. Kent Top Travel ceased trading on 1 October 2013.

=== Directorates ===
The work of the council is organized into two executive departments and three directorates. Each directorate is led by a Corporate Director who reports to the Chief Executive.

==== Chief Executive and Deputy Chief Executive’s Departments ====
The two executive departments support the work of the directorates and the council as a whole by providing specialist expertise and strategic direction. The departments also lead and co-ordinate major change and organisational development. The Chief Executive’s Department includes the council’s finance, infrastructure and public health divisions, as well as in-house strategic and legal services. The Deputy Chief Executive’s Department manages internal support services such as HR, procurement, technology, customer relations and democratic services. The statutory roles of Section 151 Officer (Corporate Director Finance), Monitoring Officer (Head of Law) and Director of Public Health all report to the Chief Executive.

==== Children, Young People and Education ====
Led by the statutory Director of Children’s Services, the directorate combines Education and Special Educational Needs (SEN) services with universal and targeted services for children and young people designed to reduce demand for specialist services, also provided or commissioned by this directorate. These include Family Hubs and Youth Justice services. The strategic focus is on prevention and early intervention, with the aim of reducing demand for more specialist social services by helping families earlier, improving parenting skills and the health and educational outcomes of young children, ensuring they are school ready. The directorate is also responsible for the delivery of statutory Adult Education services.

==== Adult Social Care and Health ====
Led by the statutory Director of Adult Social Services, the directorate provides support and care for adults who need assistance due to age, disability or health conditions. It aims to help individuals live as independently as possible while ensuring their well-being and safety. The directorate also commissions or delivers in-house a variety of statutory and non-statutory enablement and support services, including day centres and respite care for adults with learning disabilities.

==== Growth, Environment and Transport ====
This directorate oversees the majority of the council’s public-facing services outside of education and social care. It has strategic responsibility for the future of the county in terms of planning, economic development, transport policy and major transport improvement schemes, waste disposal and recycling services. It delivers a number of statutory functions, including libraries and registration services, as well as a range of leisure and cultural facilities such as country parks and the Turner Contemporary. It also delivers enforcement services, including trading standards and community safety, and provides the funding and operational support for the statutorily independent coroner’s service.

== Notable members ==
- Sir John Farnaby Lennard, 1st Baronet, first Chairman, 1889–1899
- Fiennes Cornwallis, 1st Baron Cornwallis, Chairman 1910–1930
- Lionel Sackville-West, 3rd Baron Sackville, Vice-Chairman 1923–1928
- Wykeham Cornwallis, 2nd Baron Cornwallis, Vice-Chairman 1931–1935, Chairman 1935–1936; Lord Lieutenant of Kent 1944–1972
- Sir Charles Pym, Chairman 1949–1952
- Alexander Ruthven Pym, Chairman 1964–1965
- Henry d'Avigdor-Goldsmid

== See also ==
- List of Members of Parliament in Kent
- White horse of Kent
