= Swale Borough Council elections =

Local government elections in Kent, England

Map showing the composition of Swale Borough Council after the 2023 election. Conservatives in blue, Labour in red, Liberal Democrats in yellow, Green Party in green, Swale Independents in orange, and independents in light grey.

Swale Borough Council elections are held every four years to elect Swale Borough Council in Kent, England. Since the last boundary changes in 2015 the council has comprised 47 councillors representing 24 wards. Until 2011 one third of the council was elected every year, followed by one year without election.

== Council elections ==
Summary of the council composition after recent council elections, click on the year for full details of each election. Boundary changes took place for the 2002 election, leading to the whole council bring elected in that year and reducing the number of seats by two.

Composition of the council
Year	Conservative	Labour	Liberal Democrats (Note: Includes totals for the predecessors of the Liberal Democrats, the Liberal Party and SDP (both of which participated in the Alliance).)	Swale Ind.	Green	UKIP	Independents & Others	Council control after election
Local government reorganisation; council established (50 seats)
1973	17	25	3	–	–	–	5	No overall control
1976	27	19	3	–	0	–	1	Conservative
New ward boundaries (49 seats)
1979	26	21	1	–	0	–	1	Conservative
1980	25	21	2	–	0	–	1	Conservative
1982	28	17	3	–	0	–	1	Conservative
1983	31	13	4	–	0	–	1	Conservative
1984	27	12	8	–	0	–	2	Conservative
1986	23	14	12	–	0	–	0	No overall control
1987	19	13	17	–	0	–	0	No overall control
1988	21	13	14	–	0	–	1	No overall control
1990	19	16	14	–	0	–	0	No overall control
1991	18	19	12	–	0	–	0	No overall control
1992	20	14	14	–	0	–	1	No overall control
1994	17	12	19	–	0	0	1	No overall control
1995	14	14	20	–	0	0	1	No overall control
1996	6	19	23	–	0	0	1	No overall control
1998	7	19	22	–	0	0	1	No overall control
1999	9	17	23	–	0	0	0	No overall control
2000	15	12	22	–	0	0	0	No overall control
New ward boundaries (47 seats)
2002	25	10	12	–	0	0	0	Conservative
2003	25	11	11	–	0	0	0	Conservative
2004	26	11	10	–	0	0	0	Conservative
2006	28	10	8	–	0	0	1	Conservative
2007	26	10	6	–	0	0	5 (Note: Including 4 Sheppy First)	Conservative
2008	26	9	5	–	0	0	7	Conservative
2010	33	10	3	–	0	0	1	Conservative
2011	32	13	1	–	0	0	1	Conservative
New ward boundaries (47 seats)
2015	32	4	0	–	0	9	2	Conservative
2019	16	11	5	10	2	1	2	No overall control
2023	12	15	5	11	3	0	1	No overall control

== Borough result maps ==
2002 results map

2003 results map

2004 results map

2006 results map

2007 results map

2008 results map

2010 results map

2011 results map

2015 results map

2019 results map

2023 results map

== By-election results ==
By-elections occur when seats become vacant between council elections. Below is a summary of recent by-elections; full by-election results can be found by clicking on the by-election name.

By-election	Date	Incumbent party	Winning party
Eastern by-election	25 January 2001	Conservative	Conservative
Minster Cliffs by-election	25 September 2008	Sheppey First	Conservative
Sheerness East by-election	25 September 2008	Sheppey First	Labour
Teynham and Lynsted by-election	2 October 2008	Conservative	Conservative
Kemsley by-election	8 March 2012	Conservative	Conservative
Sheppey Central by-election	16 October 2014	Conservative	UKIP
Milton Regis by-election	3 August 2017	UKIP	Labour
Sheppey East by-election	3 May 2018	Conservative	Conservative
Sheerness by-election	6 May 2021	Labour	Conservative
Priory by-election	30 September 2021	Independent	Liberal Democrats
Minster Cliffs by-election	14 September 2023	Conservative	Swale Ind.
Abbey by-election	14 December 2023	Liberal Democrats	Liberal Democrats
Priory by-election	3 September 2024	Liberal Democrats	Liberal Democrats
Murston by-election	21 November 2024	Swale Ind.	Swale Ind.
Milton Regis by-election	19 December 2024	Labour	Reform UK
