= 2002 Swale Borough Council election =

Map of the results of the 2002 Swale Borough Council election. Conservatives in blue, Liberal Democrats in yellow and Labour in red.

The 2002 Swale Borough Council election took place on 2 May 2002 to elect members of Swale Borough Council in Kent, England. The whole council was up for election with boundary changes since the last election in 2000 reducing the number of seats by two. The Conservative Party gained overall control of the council from no overall control.

== Election result ==
The Conservatives gained control of the council after taking 10 seats from the Liberal Democrats. Overall turnout at the election was 31.66%.

Swale local election result 2002
Party	Seats	Gains	Losses	Net gain/loss	Seats %	Votes %	Votes	+/−
Conservative	25			+10	53.2	43.6	23,301	
Liberal Democrats	12			-10	25.5	22.2	11,892	
Labour	10			-2	21.3	32.5	17,365	
Rock 'n' Roll Loony	0			0	0	1.2	652	
Independent	0			0	0	0.5	276	

== Ward results ==
Abbey (2 seats)
Party	Candidate	Votes	%	±%
Conservative	Bryan Mulhern	652		
Labour	Peter Salmon	550		
Conservative	Anita Walker	548		
Labour	Trevor Payne	490		
Turnout		2,240	32.5	

Borden
Party	Candidate	Votes	%	±%
Liberal Democrats	Brian Woodland	246	45.1	
Conservative	Roger Hoare	231	42.3	
Labour	Patricia Donnellan	69	12.6	
Majority		15	2.8	
Turnout		546	31.9	

Boughton & Courtenay (2 seats)
Party	Candidate	Votes	%	±%
Conservative	Andrew Bowles	950		
Conservative	George Bobbin	917		
Labour	Valerie Rowe	360		
Labour	Edwina Adderley	337		
Turnout		2,564	33.0	

Chalkwell (2 seats)
Party	Candidate	Votes	%	±%
Labour	Roger Truelove	514		
Labour	Ghlin Whelan	454		
Liberal Democrats	David Spurling	394		
Liberal Democrats	David Banks	392		
Conservative	Edward Gent	236		
Conservative	Patricia Martin	229		
Turnout		2,219	30.3	

Davington Priory
Party	Candidate	Votes	%	±%
Conservative	Brian Tovey	414	62.0	
Labour	Caroline MacDonald	254	38.0	
Majority		160	24.0	
Turnout		668	35.9	

East Downs
Party	Candidate	Votes	%	±%
Conservative	Colin Prescott	552	75.8	
Labour	Jeremy Wilson	176	24.2	
Majority		376	51.6	
Turnout		728	36.3	

Grove (2 seats)
Party	Candidate	Votes	%	±%
Liberal Democrats	Bernard Lowe	542		
Liberal Democrats	David Manning	508		
Conservative	David Goodwin	296		
Conservative	Daphne Wyatt	295		
Labour	John Lewis	197		
Labour	Gail Martin	141		
Turnout		1,979	28.1	

Hartlip, Newington & Upchurch (2 seats)
Party	Candidate	Votes	%	±%
Conservative	Gerald Lewin	820		
Conservative	John Wright	762		
Liberal Democrats	Keith Dunster	421		
Liberal Democrats	Anthony Mould	389		
Labour	Timothy Higgins	267		
Labour	Matthew Wheatcroft	192		
Turnout		2,851	34.3	

Iwade & Lower Halstow
Party	Candidate	Votes	%	±%
Liberal Democrats	Mary Goodger	337	56.3	
Conservative	Jacqueline Alcon	147	24.5	
Labour	David Walker	115	19.2	
Majority		190	31.8	
Turnout		599	33.7	

Kemsley (2 seats)
Party	Candidate	Votes	%	±%
Conservative	Brenda Simpson	572		
Conservative	Susan Gent	464		
Labour	Maureen Phillips	207		
Liberal Democrats	Kenneth Stammers	185		
Labour	Anthony Winckless	157		
Turnout		1,585	22.0	

Leysdown & Warden
Party	Candidate	Votes	%	±%
Conservative	Christopher Boden	354	59.6	
Labour	Alison Seymour-Jones	124	20.9	
Liberal Democrats	Geoffrey Partis	65	10.9	
Rock 'n' Roll Loony	James Mumford	51	8.6	
Majority		230	38.7	
Turnout		594	28.9	

Milton Regis (2 seats)
Party	Candidate	Votes	%	±%
Liberal Democrats	Elvina Lowe	564		
Liberal Democrats	Mark Baldock	523		
Labour	Anthony Phillips	475		
Labour	Fiona Gowdy	457		
Conservative	Sylvia Bennett	146		
Conservative	Reginald Gent	137		
Turnout		2,302	32.7	

Minster Cliffs (3 seats)
Party	Candidate	Votes	%	±%
Liberal Democrats	John Stanford	702		
Liberal Democrats	Michael Brown	610		
Conservative	Adrian Crowther	606		
Conservative	Robin Harris	552		
Liberal Democrats	Anne Groves	549		
Labour	Kedar Prasad	529		
Conservative	Benjamin Stokes	529		
Labour	Florence Dethridge	426		
Labour	Mark Tucker	401		
Rock 'n' Roll Loony	Michael Young	82		
Turnout		4,457	33.0	

Murston (2 seats)
Party	Candidate	Votes	%	±%
Liberal Democrats	Richard Calvert	546		
Liberal Democrats	Clive Wherrell	526		
Labour	Kenneth Stevens	266		
Labour	Phyllis Stevens	249		
Conservative	Martin Clarke	146		
Conservative	Keith Ferrin	132		
Turnout		1,865	26.6	

Queenborough & Halfway (3 seats)
Party	Candidate	Votes	%	±%
Labour	Michael Constable	814		
Conservative	Paul Hayes	810		
Conservative	Martin Goodhew	698		
Conservative	Sandra Garside	628		
Labour	Philip Gull	620		
Labour	Elizabeth Higgisn	551		
Rock 'n' Roll Loony	Christopher Driver	331		
Liberal Democrats	Amanda Ellis	174		
Liberal Democrats	John Ellis	166		
Turnout		4,792	32.6	

Roman (2 seats)
Party	Candidate	Votes	%	±%
Labour	Simon Clark	649		
Labour	Michael Haywood	616		
Liberal Democrats	William Daw	377		
Liberal Democrats	Renee Wherrell	356		
Conservative	Mayuri Patel	163		
Conservative	Nailesh Patel	152		
Turnout		2,313	32.4	

Sheerness East (2 seats)
Party	Candidate	Votes	%	±%
Labour	Ian Smart	453		
Labour	Mary Ronan	445		
Conservative	David Jones	291		
Conservative	Kenneth Mackness	276		
Rock 'n' Roll Loony	Christopher Austin	87		
Turnout		1,552	24.4	

Sheerness West (2 seats)
Party	Candidate	Votes	%	±%
Labour	Angela Harrison	625		
Labour	Stephen Worrall	619		
Independent	David Cassidy	176		
Conservative	Michael Gallagher	167		
Conservative	John Marsh	111		
Turnout		1,698	25.6	

Sheppey Central (3 seats)
Party	Candidate	Votes	%	±%
Conservative	John Morris	509		
Conservative	Timothy Hammond	504		
Conservative	Christine Coles	483		
Labour	John Crouch	447		
Labour	Ronald Smith	390		
Labour	Libby Tucker	381		
Liberal Democrats	Andrew Brown	219		
Liberal Democrats	Maria Choppen	142		
Liberal Democrats	Christine Martin	132		
Rock 'n' Roll Loony	Alma Driver	101		
Turnout		3,308	23.8	

St Ann's (2 seats)
Party	Candidate	Votes	%	±%
Conservative	Michael Cosgrove	631		
Conservative	Trevor Fentiman	618		
Labour	Paul Durkin	455		
Labour	Lionel Vaughan	439		
Liberal Democrats	Anna Stanford	226		
Turnout		2,369	32.3	

St Michael's (2 seats)
Party	Candidate	Votes	%	±%
Liberal Democrats	Brenda Hammond	546		
Liberal Democrats	Stuart Davidson	488		
Conservative	Susan Norris	439		
Conservative	Derek Carnell	399		
Labour	Edward Norton	191		
Labour	Kenneth Rowles	157		
Independent	Bernard Bibby	100		
Turnout		2,320	35.2	

Teynham & Lynsted (2 seats)
Party	Candidate	Votes	%	±%
Conservative	Sylvia Butt	687		
Conservative	Richard Barnicott	611		
Labour	Martin Bellis	436		
Labour	Stephen Lutman	409		
Turnout		2,143	29.3	

Watling (2 seats)
Party	Candidate	Votes	%	±%
Conservative	Cynthia Davis	1,094		
Conservative	David Simmons	1,036		
Labour	Michael Frohnsdorff	401		
Labour	Barry Hefferon	367		
Turnout		2,898	41.0	

West Downs
Party	Candidate	Votes	%	±%
Conservative	Donald Jordan	541	72.0	
Liberal Democrats	Anne Jenkins	109	14.5	
Labour	Kay Murphy	101	13.4	
Majority		432	57.5	
Turnout		751	39.1	

Woodstock (2 seats)
Party	Candidate	Votes	%	±%
Conservative	Alan Willicombe	932		
Conservative	Jean Willicombe	834		
Liberal Democrats	Anne McLean	747		
Liberal Democrats	Robert Baxter	711		
Labour	Jeane Holmes	200		
Labour	Andrew Cooper	192		
Turnout		3,616	47.1	
