= 2003 Swale Borough Council election =

2003 UK local government election

Map of the results of the 2003 Swale Borough Council election. Conservatives in blue, Labour in red and Liberal Democrats in yellow. Wards in dark grey were not contested in 2003.

The 2003 Swale Borough Council election took place on 1 May 2003 to elect members of Swale Borough Council in Kent, England. One third of the council was up for election and the Conservative Party stayed in overall control of the council.

After the election, the composition of the council was:

- Conservative 25
- Labour 11
- Liberal Democrats 11

== Election result ==
Swale local election result 2003
Party	Seats	Gains	Losses	Net gain/loss	Seats %	Votes %	Votes	+/−
Conservative	9	0	0	0	60.0	44.7	7,153	+1.1%
Labour	3	1	0	+1	20.0	26.5	4,245	-6.0%
Liberal Democrats	3	0	1	-1	20.0	25.3	4,043	+3.1%
Rock 'n' Roll Loony	0	0	0	0	0	3.4	541	+2.2%
Green	0	0	0	0	0	0.1	22	+0.1%

== Ward results ==
Borden
Party	Candidate	Votes	%	±%
Liberal Democrats	Brian Woodland	376	64.2	+19.1
Conservative	Roger Hoare	180	30.7	−11.6
Labour	Anthony Winckless	30	5.1	−7.5
Majority		196	33.4	+30.7
Turnout		586	33.7	+1.8
Liberal Democrats hold		Swing		

Boughton & Courtenay
Party	Candidate	Votes	%	±%
Conservative	George Bobbin	926	69.8	
Labour	Valerie Rowe	225	17.0	
Liberal Democrats	June Hammond	176	13.3	
Majority		701	52.8	
Turnout		1,327	33.7	+0.7
Conservative hold		Swing		

Grove
Party	Candidate	Votes	%	±%
Liberal Democrats	David Manning	515	52.5	
Conservative	Benjamin Stokes	303	30.9	
Labour	Jeane Holmes	163	16.6	
Majority		212	21.6	
Turnout		981	25.4	−2.7
Liberal Democrats hold		Swing		

Hartlip, Newington & Upchurch
Party	Candidate	Votes	%	±%
Conservative	John Wright	930	65.5	
Liberal Democrats	Anne Jenkins	256	18.0	
Labour	Gail Martin	233	16.4	
Majority		674	47.5	
Turnout		1,419	35.0	+0.7
Conservative hold		Swing		

Leysdown & Warden
Party	Candidate	Votes	%	±%
Conservative	Christopher Boden	303	58.6	−1.0
Labour	Angela Walder	131	25.3	+4.4
Liberal Democrats	Andrew Brown	43	8.3	−2.6
Rock 'n' Roll Loony	James Mumford	30	7.7	−0.9
Majority		172	33.3	−5.4
Turnout		517	26.2	−2.7
Conservative hold		Swing		

Milton Regis
Party	Candidate	Votes	%	±%
Labour	Fiona Gowdy	489	48.9	
Liberal Democrats	Mark Baldock	338	33.8	
Conservative	Anne Jack	141	14.1	
Rock 'n' Roll Loony	Jackie Davidson	31	3.1	
Majority		151	15.1	
Turnout		999	30.0	−2.7
Labour gain from Liberal Democrats		Swing		

Minster Cliffs
Party	Candidate	Votes	%	±%
Conservative	Adrian Crowther	533	35.3	
Liberal Democrats	Anna Groves	463	30.7	
Labour	Kedar Prasad	428	28.4	
Rock 'n' Roll Loony	Michael Young	84	5.6	
Majority		70	4.6	
Turnout		1,508	28.5	−4.5
Conservative hold		Swing		

Queenborough & Halfway
Party	Candidate	Votes	%	±%
Conservative	Martin Goodhew	665	45.5	
Labour	Libby Tucker	408	27.9	
Rock 'n' Roll Loony	Christopher Driver	257	17.6	
Liberal Democrats	John Ellis	130	8.9	
Majority		257	17.6	
Turnout		1,460	28.5	−4.1
Conservative hold		Swing		

Sheerness East
Party	Candidate	Votes	%	±%
Labour	Mary Ronan	291	43.0	
Conservative	Robin Harris	233	34.4	
Liberal Democrats	Colin Howe	153	22.6	
Majority		58	8.6	
Turnout		677	20.9	−3.5
Labour hold		Swing		

Sheerness West
Party	Candidate	Votes	%	±%
Labour	Stephen Worrall	520	63.3	
Conservative	Daphne Wyatt	151	18.4	
Liberal Democrats	Geoffrey Partis	80	9.7	
Rock 'n' Roll Loony	Christine Wellard	70	8.5	
Majority		369	44.9	
Turnout		821	21.9	−3.7
Labour hold		Swing		

Sheppey Central
Party	Candidate	Votes	%	±%
Conservative	Christine Coles	508	45.4	
Labour	John Crouch	403	36.0	
Liberal Democrats	Christine Martin	139	12.4	
Rock 'n' Roll Loony	Alma Driver	69	6.2	
Majority		105	9.4	
Turnout		1,119	21.8	−2.0
Conservative hold		Swing		

St Michael's
Party	Candidate	Votes	%	±%
Liberal Democrats	Stuart Davidson	384	38.0	
Conservative	Derek Carnell	350	34.7	
Labour	Edward Norton	254	25.1	
Green	Sharon Monk	22	2.2	
Majority		34	3.3	
Turnout		1,010	30.6	−4.6
Liberal Democrats hold		Swing		

Teynham & Lynsted
Party	Candidate	Votes	%	±%
Conservative	Richard Barnicott	579	48.7	
Labour	Kenneth Rowles	428	36.0	
Liberal Democrats	Robert Baxtor	181	15.2	
Majority		151	12.7	
Turnout		1,188	31.7	+2.4
Conservative hold		Swing		

West Downs
Party	Candidate	Votes	%	±%
Conservative	Donald Jordan	542	76.1	+4.1
Liberal Democrats	David Banks	87	12.2	−2.3
Labour	Kay Murphy	83	11.7	−1.7
Majority		455	63.9	+6.4
Turnout		712	37.8	−1.3
Conservative hold		Swing		

Woodstock
Party	Candidate	Votes	%	±%
Conservative	Jean Willicombe	809	47.9	
Liberal Democrats	Ann McLean	722	42.7	
Labour	Andrew Cooper	159	9.4	
Majority		87	5.2	
Turnout		1,690	43.3	−3.8
Conservative hold		Swing		
