= 2007 Swale Borough Council election =

2007 UK local government election

Map of the results of the 2007 Swale Borough Council election. Conservatives in blue, Sheppey First in grey, Labour in red, Liberal Democrats in yellow and independent in light grey. Wards in dark grey were not contested in 2007.

The 2007 Swale Borough Council election took place on 3 May 2007 to elect members of Swale Borough Council in Kent, England. One third of the council was up for election and the Conservative Party stayed in overall control of the council.

After the election, the composition of the council was:

- Conservative 26
- Labour 10
- Liberal Democrats 6
- Sheppey First 4
- Independent 1

== Election result ==
The new Sheppey First party won four of the six seats they contested, taking Leysdown and Warden, Minster Cliffs, Sheppey Central and Sheerness East wards. However the Conservatives remained in control of the council with 26 of the 47 councillors, despite also losing a seat in Queenborough and Halfway to Labour. This gain meant Labour remained on 10 seats, while the Liberal Democrats lost 2 seats to have 6 councillors and 1 independent candidate was elected.

Swale local election result 2007
Party	Seats	Gains	Losses	Net gain/loss	Seats %	Votes %	Votes	+/−
Conservative	6	2	4	-2	40.0	41.0	8,421	-4.1
Sheppey First	4	3	0	+3	26.7	18.2	3,741	+18.2
Labour	3	1	1	0	20.0	22.8	4,673	-4.8
Liberal Democrats	1	0	2	-2	6.7	12.9	2,637	-7.1
Independent	1	1	0	+1	6.7	2.8	566	+2.8
Green	0	0	0	0	0.0	1.1	225	+1.1
Against Kent Science Park's Residential Expansion	0	0	0	0	0.0	0.6	124	+0.6
Rock 'n' Roll Loony	0	0	0	0	0.0	0.5	94	+0.5
Money Reform	0	0	0	0	0.0	0.2	38	+0.1

== Ward results ==
Borden
Party	Candidate	Votes	%	±%
Conservative	Nicholas Hampshire	429	53.7	+23.0
Liberal Democrats	Brian Woodland	265	33.2	−31.0
Labour	Peter Paige	105	13.1	+8.0
Majority		164	20.5	
Turnout		799	42.3	+8.6
Conservative gain from Liberal Democrats		Swing		

Boughton and Courtenay
Party	Candidate	Votes	%	±%
Conservative	George Bobbin	1,023	66.7	−0.3
Labour	Ash Rehal	247	16.1	+0.6
Green	Timothy Valentine	225	14.7	+14.7
Money Reform	Anne Belsey	38	2.5	+2.5
Majority		776	50.6	+1.0
Turnout		1,533	36.1	−6.9
Conservative hold		Swing		

Grove
Party	Candidate	Votes	%	±%
Conservative	Duncan Dewar-Whalley	700	50.3	+10.8
Labour	Mike Baldock	404	29.0	+9.9
Liberal Democrats	Dave Manning	289	20.7	−13.7
Majority		296	21.2	+16.1
Turnout		1,393		
Conservative gain from Liberal Democrats		Swing		

Hartlip, Newington and Upchurch
Party	Candidate	Votes	%	±%
Conservative	John Wright	1,099	66.9	−3.3
Labour	Ruth Walker-Grice	274	16.7	+1.6
Liberal Democrats	Bill Daw	269	16.4	+1.7
Majority		825	50.2	−4.9
Turnout		1,642		
Conservative hold		Swing		

Leysdown and Warden
Party	Candidate	Votes	%	±%
Sheppey First	Pat Sandle	434	59.0	+59.0
Conservative	Andy Booth	213	28.9	−29.7
Labour	Matt Wheatcroft	89	12.1	−13.2
Majority		221	30.1	
Turnout		736	33.3	+7.1
Sheppey First hold		Swing		

Milton Regis
Party	Candidate	Votes	%	±%
Labour	Adam Tolhurst	504	41.7	+11.5
Liberal Democrats	Berick Tomes	377	31.2	−15.8
Conservative	Pat Martin	217	17.9	−0.2
Independent	Andrew Crayford	65	5.4	+5.4
Rock 'n' Roll Loony	Sheikh Mihand	47	3.9	−0.8
Majority		127	10.5	
Turnout		1,210	34.5	−3.5
Labour hold		Swing		

Minster Cliffs
Party	Candidate	Votes	%	±%
Sheppey First	Christopher Boden	1,316	63.0	+63.0
Conservative	Adrian Crowther	460	22.0	−18.7
Labour	Robbie Stanbridge	183	8.8	−15.5
Liberal Democrats	David Kemp	83	4.0	−21.3
Rock 'n' Roll Loony	Mad Mike Young	47	2.2	+2.2
Majority		856	41.0	
Turnout		2,089	37.8	+3.5
Sheppey First gain from Conservative		Swing		

Queenborough and Halfway
Party	Candidate	Votes	%	±%
Labour	Mike Constable	780	40.6	−2.3
Conservative	Peter Marchington	635	33.0	−10.8
Sheppey First	Raymond Adams	507	26.4	+26.4
Majority		145	7.6	
Turnout		1,922	34.7	−1.3
Labour gain from Conservative		Swing		

Sheerness East
Party	Candidate	Votes	%	±%
Sheppey First	Gemma Wray	332	35.1	+35.1
Labour	Jennie Ronan	301	31.8	−5.0
Conservative	Kelly Carruthers	210	22.2	−9.3
Liberal Democrats	Malcolm Howe	103	10.9	−10.1
Majority		31	3.3	
Turnout		946	26.9	−0.4
Sheppey First gain from Labour		Swing		

Sheerness West
Party	Candidate	Votes	%	±%
Labour	Steve Worrall	603	49.5	−9.6
Sheppey First	David Cassidy	408	33.5	+33.5
Conservative	Jane Morris	207	17.0	−7.7
Majority		195	16.0	−18.4
Turnout		1,218	30.2	+1.4
Labour hold		Swing		

Sheppey Central
Party	Candidate	Votes	%	±%
Sheppey First	Lesley Ingham	744	45.3	+45.3
Conservative	Christine Coles	522	31.8	−5.9
Labour	David Sargent	246	15.0	−4.8
Liberal Democrats	Colin Howe	130	7.9	−2.6
Majority		222	13.5	
Turnout		1,642	27.8	−3.2
Sheppey First gain from Conservative		Swing		

St Michaels
Party	Candidate	Votes	%	±%
Liberal Democrats	Nick Williams	641	46.8	+4.1
Conservative	Derek Carnell	525	38.3	−4.0
Labour	Shelley Cheeseman	203	14.8	−0.2
Majority		116	8.5	+8.0
Turnout		1,369	37.3	−3.8
Liberal Democrats hold		Swing		

Teynham and Lynsted
Party	Candidate	Votes	%	±%
Conservative	Richard Barnicott	802	60.1	+3.5
Labour	Ken Rowles	368	27.6	+8.6
Liberal Democrats	David Spurling	164	12.3	+12.3
Majority		434	32.5	+0.3
Turnout		1,334	33.7	−3.0
Conservative hold		Swing		

West Downs
Party	Candidate	Votes	%	±%
Independent	Monique Bonney	501	57.7	+57.7
Conservative	Donald Jordan	368	42.3	−33.8
Majority		133	15.4	
Turnout		869	44.0	+6.2
Independent gain from Conservative		Swing		

Woodstock
Party	Candidate	Votes	%	±%
Conservative	Jean Willicombe	1,011	55.6	+9.4
Labour	Christine Truelove	366	20.1	+5.6
Liberal Democrats	Anne Jenkins	316	17.4	−17.1
Against Kent Science Park's Residential Expansion	Joe Brown	124	6.8	+6.8
Majority		645	35.5	+23.8
Turnout		1,817	44.8	−6.9
Conservative hold		Swing		
