= 2011 Swale Borough Council election =

2011 UK local government election

Map of the results of the 2011 Swale Borough Council election. Conservatives in blue, Labour in red, Liberal Democrats in yellow and independent in light grey.

The 2011 Swale Borough Council election took place on 5 May 2011 to elect members of Swale Borough Council in Kent, England. The whole council was up for election and the Conservative Party stayed in overall control of the council.

== Background ==
For the 2011 election Swale switched to having the whole council elected every four years, from the previous system where a third of the seats were elected each year, followed by one year without an election. The decision was taken by the council in March 2010, after a consultation produced 162 responses in favour of the change and 136 responses against changing. As a result, all 47 seats on the council were contested with over 120 candidates standing at election.

== Election result ==
The Conservatives remained in control of the council with 32 of the 47 seats, after a net loss of 1 seat. Labour increased to 13 councillors, the Liberal Democrats were reduced to 1 seat and the only independent councillor retained her seat.

Labour's Mark Ellen regained a seat in Sheerness East that he had lost at the 2010 election, while in Milton Regis Labour defeated the leader of the Liberal Democrat group Elvie Lowe who had represented the ward for 24 years. However the Conservatives took a seat from Labour in St Michaels ward, where the Conservative deputy mayoress Sylvia Bennett gained a seat on the council.

In West Downs the only independent councillor, Monique Bonney, held her seat defeating Conservative county councillor Mike Whiting by 41 votes. Meanwhile, the closest result came in Murston where both the Conservative and Liberal Democrat councillors, Ed Gent and Dave Banks, took 420 votes after six recounts. Conservative Ed Gent took the seat after his name was pulled out of a hat and he was therefore given one extra vote. This meant Mike Henderson was the only Liberal Democrat to be elected after he held his seat in Davington Priory.

Following the election Roger Truelove became the new leader of the Labour group, replacing the leader for the previous 15 years Angela Harrison. The only Liberal Democrat councillor, Mike Henderson, meanwhile joined with the independent councillor Monique Bonney in the independent group on the council to ensure they both got positions on council committees.

Swale local election result 2011
Party	Seats	Gains	Losses	Net gain/loss	Seats %	Votes %	Votes	+/−
Conservative	32	1	2	-1	68.1	50.4	33,548	+0.2%
Labour	13	4	1	+3	27.7	34.8	23,188	+5.3%
Liberal Democrats	1	0	2	-2	2.1	6.8	4,520	-9.3%
Independent	1	0	0	0	2.1	1.0	635	+1.0%
UKIP	0	0	0	0	0	5.5	3,683	+1.8%
Green	0	0	0	0	0	1.2	815	+0.6%
Monster Raving Loony	0	0	0	0	0	0.3	213	+0.3%

== Ward results ==
Abbey (2 seats)
Party	Candidate	Votes	%	±%
Conservative	Bryan Mulhern	759		
Conservative	Anita Walker	682		
Labour	Trevor Payne	626		
Labour	Fran Rehal	536		
Green	Gary Miller	322		
Liberal Democrats	David Evans	191		
Liberal Democrats	Richard Williams	154		
Turnout		3,270	40.4	−23.1
Conservative hold		Swing		
Conservative hold		Swing		

Borden
Party	Candidate	Votes	%	±%
Conservative	Nicholas Hampshire	506	50.9	−2.8
UKIP	Michael Baldock	361	36.3	+36.3
Labour	Matthew Partridge	127	12.8	−0.3
Majority		145	14.6	−5.9
Turnout		994	51.7	+9.4
Conservative hold		Swing		

Boughton and Courtenay (2 seats)
Party	Candidate	Votes	%	±%
Conservative	Andrew Bowles	1,291		
Conservative	George Bobbin	1,187		
Labour	Ash Rehal	586		
Turnout		3,064	49.1	+11.7
Conservative hold		Swing		
Conservative hold		Swing		

Chalkwell (2 seats)
Party	Candidate	Votes	%	±%
Labour	Roger Truelove	900		
Labour	Ghlin Whelan	760		
Conservative	Clive Duncan	316		
Conservative	Sandra Warham	272		
UKIP	Alison Donkin	147		
Liberal Democrats	Anthea Spurling	141		
Turnout		2,536	39.8	−23.8
Labour hold		Swing		
Labour hold		Swing		

Davington Priory
Party	Candidate	Votes	%	±%
Liberal Democrats	Michael Henderson	360	43.8	−14.4
Conservative	Andy Culham	256	31.2	+3.6
Labour	Caroline MacDonald	145	17.7	+3.5
Green	Tim Valentine	60	7.3	+7.3
Majority		104	12.7	−17.9
Turnout		821	44.1	−0.2
Liberal Democrats hold		Swing		

East Downs
Party	Candidate	Votes	%	±%
Conservative	Colin Prescott	731	65.4	−12.2
Labour	Barry Hefferon	299	26.8	+4.4
UKIP	Nadine McDermott	87	7.8	+7.8
Majority		432	38.7	−16.5
Turnout		1,117	53.3	+11.9
Conservative hold		Swing		

Grove (2 seats)
Party	Candidate	Votes	%	±%
Conservative	Duncan Dewar-Whalley	792		
Conservative	Gareth Randall	781		
Labour	Richard Raycraft	488		
Labour	Peter Wilson	422		
UKIP	Ian Davison	418		
Liberal Democrats	Bernie Lowe	226		
Turnout		3,127	38.5	−25.2
Conservative hold		Swing		
Conservative hold		Swing		

Hartlip, Newington and Upchurch (2 seats)
Party	Candidate	Votes	%	±%
Conservative	Gerry Lewin	1,031		
Conservative	John Wright	836		
UKIP	Richard Palmer	509		
Labour	James Graham	418		
Labour	David Walker	339		
Turnout		3,133	45.2	−27.3
Conservative hold		Swing		
Conservative hold		Swing		

Iwade and Lower Halstow
Party	Candidate	Votes	%	±%
Conservative	Ben Stokes	712	52.6	−5.9
Labour	Janet Gregory	509	37.6	+21.6
UKIP	Christopher Trafford	77	5.7	+5.7
Liberal Democrats	Peter Springham	56	4.1	−21.3
Majority		203	15.0	−18.1
Turnout		1,354	44.9	+10.1
Conservative hold		Swing		

Kemsley (2 seats)
Party	Candidate	Votes	%	±%
Conservative	Brenda Simpson	830		
Conservative	Sue Gent	797		
Labour	Tony Phillips	461		
Labour	Bradley Wise	397		
UKIP	Peter Paige	230		
Liberal Democrats	Mary Zeng	122		
Turnout		2,837	33.4	−29.3
Conservative hold		Swing		
Conservative hold		Swing		

Leysdown and Warden
Party	Candidate	Votes	%	±%
Conservative	Pat Sandle	438	62.8	+33.9
Labour	Matt Wheatcroft	259	37.2	+25.1
Majority		179	25.6	
Turnout		697	32.3	−1.0
Conservative hold		Swing		

Milton Regis (2 seats)
Party	Candidate	Votes	%	±%
Labour	Adam Tolhurst	527		
Labour	Tony Winckless	491		
Liberal Democrats	Elvie Lowe	353		
Conservative	Margaret Bridge	331		
Conservative	Eileen Hodgson	289		
Liberal Democrats	David Spurling	227		
Monster Raving Loony	Sheikh Mihand	42		
Turnout		2,260	37.2	+4.4
Labour hold		Swing		
Labour gain from Liberal Democrats		Swing		

Minster Cliffs (3 seats)
Party	Candidate	Votes	%	±%
Conservative	Adrian Crowther	1,148		
Conservative	Ken Pugh	1,057		
Conservative	Andy Booth	910		
Labour	Jamie Bicknell	533		
Labour	Libby Tucker	532		
Labour	Mark Tucker	484		
UKIP	Maureen Morgan	390		
Turnout		5,054	38.5	−26.0
Conservative hold		Swing		
Conservative hold		Swing		
Conservative hold		Swing		

Murston (2 seats)
Party	Candidate	Votes	%	±%
Labour	Nick Williams	482		
Conservative	Ed Gent	421		
Liberal Democrats	Dave Banks	420		
Labour	Paul Williams	369		
Liberal Democrats	Keith Nevols	236		
Turnout		1,928	32.3	−24.0
Labour gain from Liberal Democrats		Swing		
Conservative hold		Swing		

Queenborough and Halfway (3 seats)
Party	Candidate	Votes	%	±%
Labour	Jackie Constable	908		
Conservative	Peter Marchington	846		
Labour	Mick Constable	841		
Conservative	Richard Darby	812		
Conservative	Mick Galvin	754		
Labour	Julian Stewart	625		
Liberal Democrats	Sandy Sims	149		
Turnout		4,935	36.9	−23.9
Labour hold		Swing		
Conservative hold		Swing		
Labour hold		Swing		

Roman (2 seats)
Party	Candidate	Votes	%	±%
Labour	Mike Haywood	752		
Labour	Martin McCusker	530		
Conservative	Alan Blackley	396		
Conservative	Keith Ferrin	279		
UKIP	Aaron Donkin	207		
Liberal Democrats	Rosemary Madgwick	119		
Turnout		2,283	36.2	−24.5
Labour hold		Swing		
Labour gain from Conservative		Swing		

Sheerness East (2 seats)
Party	Candidate	Votes	%	±%
Labour	Mark Ellen	504		
Labour	David Sargent	453		
Conservative	Chris Foulds	376		
Conservative	Emma Bridge	360		
Liberal Democrats	Colin Howe	98		
Turnout		1,791	31.8	−19.1
Labour gain from Conservative		Swing		
Labour hold		Swing		

Sheerness West (2 seats)
Party	Candidate	Votes	%	±%
Labour	Angela Harrison	688		
Labour	Stephen Worrall	575		
Conservative	David Wilson	434		
Liberal Democrats	David Kemp	122		
Turnout		1,829	32.1	−19.4
Labour hold		Swing		
Labour hold		Swing		

Sheppey Central (3 seats)
Party	Candidate	Votes	%	±%
Conservative	June Garrad	911		
Conservative	John Morris	871		
Conservative	Lesley Ingham	838		
Labour	Alan Henley	664		
Labour	Pat Wiggins	618		
Labour	Ian Smart	557		
UKIP	Rosemary Donkin	326		
Monster Raving Loony	Mad Mike Young	171		
Turnout		4,956	32.0	−37.7
Conservative hold		Swing		
Conservative hold		Swing		
Conservative hold		Swing		

St Anns
Party	Candidate	Votes	%	±%
Conservative	Mike Cosgrove	906		
Conservative	John Coulter	854		
Labour	Judith Webb	628		
Labour	Paul Durkin	627		
Green	Tina Hagger	224		
Liberal Democrats	Brian Head	154		
Liberal Democrats	Richard Matthewman	100		
Turnout		3,493	47.5	−21.7
Conservative hold		Swing		
Conservative hold		Swing		

St Michaels (2 seats)
Party	Candidate	Votes	%	±%
Conservative	Derek Conway	1,242		
Conservative	Sylvia Bennett	1,021		
Labour	Shelley Cheesman	521		
Labour	Geraldine Feltham	403		
Liberal Democrats	Brenda Hammond	317		
UKIP	Stephen Trafford	296		
Turnout		3,800	44.0	+7.1
Conservative hold		Swing		
Conservative gain from Labour		Swing		

Teynham and Lynsted (2 seats)
Party	Candidate	Votes	%	±%
Conservative	Lloyd Bowen	940		
Conservative	Rick Barnicott	857		
Labour	Ian Buxton	470		
Labour	Gillian Griffiths	460		
UKIP	James Nash	163		
Independent	Graeme William	107		
Turnout		2,997	42.4	−23.9
Conservative hold		Swing		
Conservative hold		Swing		

Watling (2 seats)
Party	Candidate	Votes	%	±%
Conservative	David Simmons	979		
Conservative	Ted Wilcox	941		
Labour	Catherine Read	430		
Labour	Michael Wakeman	364		
Liberal Democrats	Ruth Cronk	331		
Liberal Democrats	Michael Wheeler	329		
Green	Huw Jones	209		
Turnout		3,583	47.6	−22.1
Conservative hold		Swing		
Conservative hold		Swing		

West Downs
Party	Candidate	Votes	%	±%
Independent	Monique Bonney	528	52.0	−5.7
Conservative	Mike Whiting	487	48.0	+5.7
Majority		41	4.0	−11.3
Turnout		1,015	52.1	+8.1
Independent hold		Swing		

Woodstock (2 seats)
Party	Candidate	Votes	%	±%
Conservative	Alan Willicombe	1,121		
Conservative	Jean Willicombe	950		
UKIP	Lee Burgess	472		
Labour	Margaret Cooper	441		
Labour	Andrew Cooper	439		
Liberal Democrats	Ann McLean	315		
Turnout		3,738	53.7	−24.4
Conservative hold		Swing		
Conservative hold		Swing		

== By-elections between 2011 and 2015 ==
=== Kemsley ===
A by-election was held in Kemsley on 8 March 2012 after the death of Conservative councillor Brenda Simpson. The seat was held for the Conservatives by Mike Whiting with a majority of 72 votes over Labour candidate Richard Raycraft.

Kemsley by-election 8 March 2012
Party	Candidate	Votes	%	±%
Conservative	Mike Whiting	384	33.7	−16.9
Labour	Richard Raycraft	312	27.3	−0.7
UKIP	Derek Carnell	279	24.5	+10.5
Liberal Democrats	Berick Tomes	166	14.5	+7.1
Majority		72	6.4	
Turnout		1,141	23.2	−10.2
Conservative hold		Swing		

=== Sheppey Central ===
A by-election was held in Sheppey Central on 16 October 2014 following the death of Conservative councillor John Morris. The seat was gained for the UK Independence Party by David Jones with a majority of 507 votes over Conservative Tina Booth. David Jones became the second UK Independence Party councillor on Swale council after the defection of Adrian Crowther from the Conservatives in 2013.

Sheppey Central by-election 16 October 2014
Party	Candidate	Votes	%	±%
UKIP	David Jones	831	58.4	+42.7
Conservative	Tina Booth	324	22.8	−21.2
Labour	Alan Henley	240	16.9	−15.2
Monster Raving Loony	"Mad" Mike Young	27	1.9	0.0
Majority		507	35.6	
Turnout		1,422	19.9	−12.1
UKIP gain from Conservative		Swing		
