= 2004 Swale Borough Council election =

2004 UK local government election

Map of the results of the 2004 Swale Borough Council election. Conservatives in blue, Liberal Democrats in yellow and Labour in red. Wards in dark grey were not contested in 2004.

The 2004 Swale Borough Council election took place on 10 June 2004 to elect members of Swale Borough Council in Kent, England. One third of the council was up for election and the Conservative Party stayed in overall control of the council.

After the election, the composition of the council was:

- Conservative 26
- Labour 11
- Liberal Democrats 10

== Election result ==
The Conservatives increased their majority on the council after gaining two seats, but also losing one seat to Labour. The Conservatives gains came in Abbey, which they took from Labour, and in Iwade & Lower Halstow from the Liberal Democrats, while the Conservative group leader Andrew Bowles was one of the councillors who retained their seats. However the Labour mayoress of Swale, Jackie Constable, won in Queenborough & Halfway to take the seat from the Conservatives.

Swale local election result 2004
Party	Seats	Gains	Losses	Net gain/loss	Seats %	Votes %	Votes	+/−
Conservative	9	2	1	+1	56.3	46.4	9,647	+1.7%
Liberal Democrats	4	0	1	-1	25.0	21.4	4,439	-3.9%
Labour	3	1	1	0	18.8	29.4	6,106	+2.9%
UKIP	0	0	0	0	0	1.1	232	+1.1%
Independent	0	0	0	0	0	0.9	194	+0.9%
Rock 'n' Roll Loony	0	0	0	0	0	0.8	157	-2.6%

== Ward results ==
Abbey
Party	Candidate	Votes	%	±%
Conservative	Anita Walker	683	53.0	
Labour	Peter Salmon	606	47.0	
Majority		77	6.0	
Turnout		1,289	38.2	+5.7
Conservative gain from Labour		Swing		

Boughton & Courtenay
Party	Candidate	Votes	%	±%
Conservative	Andrew Bowles	1,134	67.0	−2.8
Liberal Democrats	June Hammond	295	17.4	+4.1
Labour	Valerie Rowe	263	15.5	−1.5
Majority		839	49.6	−3.2
Turnout		1,692	43.0	+9.3
Conservative hold		Swing		

Chalkwell
Party	Candidate	Votes	%	±%
Labour	Ghlin Whelan	560	47.6	
Conservative	Derek Carnell	388	33.0	
Liberal Democrats	Diane Fellows	228	19.4	
Majority		172	14.6	
Turnout		1,176	33.9	+3.6
Labour hold		Swing		

Davington Priory
Party	Candidate	Votes	%	±%
Conservative	Brian Tovey	429	65.7	+3.7
Labour	Caroline MacDonald	224	34.3	−3.7
Majority		205	31.4	+7.4
Turnout		653	37.0	+1.1
Conservative hold		Swing		

East Downs
Party	Candidate	Votes	%	±%
Conservative	Colin Prescott	682	76.9	+1.1
Labour	Catherine Read	205	23.1	−1.1
Majority		477	53.8	+2.2
Turnout		887	46.3	+10.0
Conservative hold		Swing		

Iwade & Lower Halstow
Party	Candidate	Votes	%	±%
Conservative	Benjamin Stokes	381	41.4	+16.9
Liberal Democrats	Mary Goodger	342	37.2	−19.1
Labour	Kenneth Stevens	197	21.4	+2.2
Majority		39	4.2	
Turnout		920	44.5	+10.8
Conservative gain from Liberal Democrats		Swing		

Kemsley
Party	Candidate	Votes	%	±%
Conservative	Susan Gent	531	50.0	
UKIP	Keith Woollven	232	21.9	
Labour	Anthony Winckless	184	17.3	
Liberal Democrats	Kenneth Stammers	114	10.7	
Majority		299	28.1	
Turnout		1,061	27.5	+5.5
Conservative hold		Swing		

Milton Regis
Party	Candidate	Votes	%	±%
Liberal Democrats	Elvina Lowe	568	47.0	+13.2
Labour	Phyllis Stevens	365	30.2	−18.7
Conservative	Patricia Martin	219	18.1	+4.0
Rock 'n' Roll Loony	Jackie Davidson	57	4.7	+1.6
Majority		203	16.8	+1.7
Turnout		1,209	38.0	+8.0
Liberal Democrats hold		Swing		

Minster Cliffs
Party	Candidate	Votes	%	±%
Liberal Democrats	Michael Brown	725	39.4	+8.7
Conservative	Katherine Coles	684	37.2	+1.9
Labour	Libby Tucker	329	17.9	−10.5
Rock 'n' Roll Loony	Michael Young	100	5.4	−0.2
Majority		41	2.2	
Turnout		1,838	35.3	+6.8
Liberal Democrats hold		Swing		

Murston
Party	Candidate	Votes	%	±%
Liberal Democrats	David Banks	585	59.7	
Conservative	Nailesh Patel	208	21.2	
Labour	Kenneth Rowles	187	19.1	
Majority		377	38.5	
Turnout		980	28.6	+2.0
Liberal Democrats hold		Swing		

Queenborough & Halfway
Party	Candidate	Votes	%	±%
Labour	Jacqueline Constable	754	41.9	+14.0
Conservative	Kenneth Pugh	712	39.5	−6.0
Independent	David Cassidy	194	10.8	+10.8
Liberal Democrats	Colin Howe	141	7.8	−1.1
Majority		42	2.4	
Turnout		1,801	35.7	+7.2
Labour gain from Conservative		Swing		

Roman
Party	Candidate	Votes	%	±%
Labour	Michael Haywood	666	54.5	
Conservative	Mayuri Patel	297	24.3	
Liberal Democrats	David Spurling	260	21.3	
Majority		369	30.2	
Turnout		1,223	36.7	+4.3
Labour hold		Swing		

Sheppey Central
Party	Candidate	Votes	%	±%
Conservative	Sandra Garside	738	46.4	+1.0
Labour	John Crouch	561	35.3	−0.7
Liberal Democrats	Christine Martin	291	18.3	+5.9
Majority		177	11.1	+1.7
Turnout		1,590	32.0	+10.2
Conservative hold		Swing		

St Ann's
Party	Candidate	Votes	%	±%
Conservative	Trevor Fentiman	825	55.0	
Labour	Paul Durkin	350	23.3	
Liberal Democrats	Martin Bellis	324	21.6	
Majority		475	31.7	
Turnout		1,499	41.5	+9.2
Conservative hold		Swing		

St Michael's
Party	Candidate	Votes	%	±%
Liberal Democrats	Brenda Hammond	566	42.7	+4.7
Conservative	Susan Norris	560	42.3	+7.6
Labour	Eamonn Norton	198	15.0	−10.1
Majority		6	0.5	−2.9
Turnout		1,324	41.1	+10.5
Liberal Democrats hold		Swing		

Watling
Party	Candidate	Votes	%	±%
Conservative	David Simmons	1,176	72.0	
Labour	Ruth Hefferon	457	28.0	
Majority		719	44.0	
Turnout		1,633	45.1	+4.1
Conservative hold		Swing		
