= 2015 Swale Borough Council election =

2015 UK local government election

Results by ward

An election was held to Swale Borough Council in England as part of the United Kingdom local elections on 7 May 2015. All 47 seats were up for election under new ward boundaries.

The party results were as follows: Conservatives: 32, UKIP: 9, Labour: 4, and Independents: 2.

== Ward results ==
Abbey (2 Seats)
Party	Candidate	Votes	%	±%
Conservative	Anita Walker	839	18	
Conservative	Bryan Mulhern	799	17	
Labour	Trevor Raymond Payne	659	14	
Labour	Frances Rehal	513	11	
Independent	Sue Akhurst	448	10	
Green	Tina Jane Hagger	389	8	
UKIP	Andrea Mckenna	365	8	
Green	Gary Miller	331	7	
Independent	Gulliver Immink	305	7	
Majority				
Turnout		4,648	63.0	
Conservative hold		Swing		
Conservative hold		Swing		

Bobbing, Iwade and Lower Halstow (2 Seats)
Party	Candidate	Votes	%	±%
Conservative	Ben Stokes	1,336	32	
Conservative	Duncan Dewar-Whalley	1,295	31	
UKIP	Lloyd George Chapman	881	21	
Labour	Nigel Randell	656	16	
Majority				
Turnout		4,168	73.1	
Conservative hold		Swing		
Conservative hold		Swing		

Borden and Grove Park (2 Seats)
Party	Candidate	Votes	%	±%
Conservative	Nicholas Hampshire	1,403	28	
UKIP	Mike Baldock	1,344	27	
Conservative	Gareth Randall	1,024	21	
UKIP	Pat Kazim	623	13	
Labour	Margaret Cooper	529	11	
Majority				
Turnout		4,923	67.9	
Conservative hold		Swing		
UKIP gain from Conservative		Swing		

Boughton and Courtenay (2 Seats)
Party	Candidate	Votes	%	±%
Conservative	Andrew Bowles	1,535	27	
Conservative	George Bobbin	1,434	25	
UKIP	Eve Martin	676	12	
Independent	Jeff Tutt	579	10	
Labour	Valerie Janet Collman	518	9	
Green	Tim Valentine	479	9	
Labour	Ashok Kumar Rehal	403	7	
Majority				
Turnout		5,624	72.8	
Conservative hold		Swing		
Conservative hold		Swing		

Chalkwell
Party	Candidate	Votes	%	±%
Labour	Ghlin Whelan	518	44	
Conservative	Sylvia Bennett	366	31	
UKIP	Paul Ian Gebbie	242	21	
Liberal Democrats	Anthea Mary Spurling	44	4	
Majority				
Turnout		1,170	59.8	
Labour hold		Swing		

East Downs
Party	Candidate	Votes	%	±%
Conservative	Colin Prescott	1,027	64	
Labour	Barry William Hefferon	294	18	
Green	Huw Maelor Jones	274	17	
Majority				
Turnout		1,595	75.2	
Conservative hold		Swing		

Hartlip, Newington and Upchurch (2 Seats)
Party	Candidate	Votes	%	±%
Conservative	Gerry Lewin	1,671	32	
Conservative	John Wright	1,226	23	
UKIP	Richard Palmer	1,070	20	
UKIP	Helen Walker	798	15	
Labour	Simon Clark	534	10	
Majority				
Turnout		5,299	73.4	
Conservative hold		Swing		
Conservative hold		Swing		

Homewood (2 Seats)
Party	Candidate	Votes	%	±%
Conservative	Alan Campbell Horton	1,171	22	
Labour	Roger Truelove	1,052	20	
Labour	Richard Raycraft	983	19	
Conservative	Danielle Marie Smith	960	18	
UKIP	Christine Palmer	797	15	
Liberal Democrats	Brenda Hammond	295	6	
Majority				
Turnout		5,258	69.2	
Conservative gain from Labour		Swing		
Labour hold		Swing		

Kemsley (2 Seats)
Party	Candidate	Votes	%	±%
Conservative	Susan Ann Gent	1,118	25	
Conservative	Mike Dendor	1,031	23	
UKIP	Derek William Carnell	952	22	
Labour	Andy Cooper	561	13	
Labour	Libby McCusker	556	13	
Liberal Democrats	Mary Zeng	194	4	
Majority				
Turnout		4,412	61.9	
Conservative hold		Swing		
Conservative hold		Swing		

Milton Regis (2 Seats)
Party	Candidate	Votes	%	±%
Conservative	Roger Gordon Clark	993	27	
UKIP	Katy Coleman	849	23	
Labour	Adam Tolhurst	845	23	
Labour	Tony Winckless	754	20	
Liberal Democrats	David Spurling	252	7	
Majority				
Turnout		3,693	59.6	
Conservative gain from Labour		Swing		
UKIP gain from Labour		Swing		

Minster Cliffs (3 Seats)
Party	Candidate	Votes	%	±%
UKIP	Adrian Crowther	1,552	23	
Conservative	Andy Booth	1,528	23	
Conservative	Ken Pugh	1,479	22	
Conservative	Heather Thomas-Pugh	1,217	18	
Labour	Libby Tucker	864	13	
Majority				
Turnout		6,640	65.8	
UKIP gain from Conservative		Swing		
Conservative hold		Swing		
Conservative hold		Swing		

Murston (2 Seats)
Party	Candidate	Votes	%	±%
Conservative	Samuel Koffie-Williams	892	28	
UKIP	James Hall	876	28	
Labour	Ken Rowles	621	20	
Labour	Paul Wilson	466	15	
Liberal Democrats	Rosemary Madgwick	324	10	
Majority				
Turnout		3,179	54.5	
Conservative hold		Swing		
UKIP gain from Labour		Swing		

Priory
Party	Candidate	Votes	%	±%
Independent	Michael Scott Henderson	610	50	
Conservative	Andrew Culham	356	29	
Labour	Janet Elizabeth Miall	196	16	
Green	Helen Eileen Miller	61	5	
Majority				
Turnout		1,223	62.5	
Independent hold		Swing		

Queenborough and Halfway (3 Seats)
Party	Candidate	Votes	%	±%
UKIP	Richard Darby	1,511	25	
Conservative	Cameron Beart	1,230	20	
Conservative	Peter Marchington	1,115	18	
Labour	Mick Cole	810	13	
Labour	Rikki Cole	671	11	
Labour	Terry Purvis	518	8	
Independent	Eddie Johnson	258	4	
Majority				
Turnout		6,113	62.9	
UKIP gain from Labour		Swing		
Conservative gain from Labour		Swing		
Conservative hold		Swing		

Roman (2 Seats)
Party	Candidate	Votes	%	±%
Conservative	Sarah Aldridge	1,211	26	
UKIP	Paul Fleming	1,008	21	
Labour	Georgie Jessiman	964	20	
Conservative	Dawn Louise Gale	784	17	
Labour	Martin McCusker	740	16	
Majority				
Turnout		4,707	61.4	
Conservative gain from Labour		Swing		
UKIP gain from Labour		Swing		

Sheerness (3 Seats)
Party	Candidate	Votes	%	±%
UKIP	Mick Galvin	1,562	22	
Labour	Angela Harrison	1,315	18	
Labour	Mark Ellen	1,149	16	
Labour	Steve Worrall	1,106	15	
Conservative	John Dewey	1,054	15	
Conservative	Andrew James Scott	742	10	
Liberal Democrats	David Kemp	278	4	
Majority				
Turnout		7,206	52.1	
UKIP gain from Labour		Swing		
Labour hold		Swing		
Labour hold		Swing		

Sheppey Central (3 Seats)
Party	Candidate	Votes	%	±%
Conservative	Tina Booth	1,227	16	
UKIP	June Garrad	1,203	16	
Conservative	Ken Ingleton	1,152	15	
UKIP	David Lloyd Jones	1,108	15	
Conservative	Peter Macdonald	987	13	
Labour	Alan Henley	704	9	
Labour	Pat Wiggins	647	9	
Independent	Elliott Matthew Jayes	251	3	
Monster Raving Loony	Mad Mike Young	230	3	
Majority				
Turnout		7,509	60.8	
Conservative hold		Swing		
UKIP hold		Swing		
Conservative hold		Swing		

Sheppey East (2 Seats)
Party	Candidate	Votes	%	±%
UKIP	Padmini Nissanga	1089	32	
Conservative	Lesley Ingham	815	24	
Conservative	Pat Sandle	680	20	
Labour	Mark Tucker	336	10	
Labour	Matt Wheatcroft	273	8	
Independent	Geoff Partis	205	6	
Majority				
Turnout		3,398	61.3	
UKIP gain from Conservative		Swing		
Conservative hold		Swing		

St Ann's (2 Seats)
Party	Candidate	Votes	%	±%
Conservative	Mike Cosgrove	1096	22	
Conservative	Nigel Kay	879	18	
Labour	Paul Durkin	663	14	
Labour	Carole Hannah Jackson	614	13	
UKIP	Shelley Wilson	451	9	
Green	Gavin Alastair Eugene McGregor	327	7	
Independent	Mark Hinton	318	7	
Independent	Paul John Cumberland	305	6	
Green	Juman Simaan	223	5	
Majority				
Turnout		4,876	68.7	
Conservative hold		Swing		
Conservative hold		Swing		

Teynham and Lynsted (2 Seats)
Party	Candidate	Votes	%	±%
Conservative	Lloyd Bowen	1,680	40	
Conservative	Mike Whiting	990	23	
UKIP	Trevor Howard Fentiman	878	21	
Labour	Philip Dangerfield	691	16	
Majority				
Turnout		4,239	68.5	
Conservative hold		Swing		
Conservative hold		Swing		

The Meads
Party	Candidate	Votes	%	±%
Conservative	James Christopher Hunt	722	54	
UKIP	Matthew Palmer	354	26	
Labour	Karen Watson	267	20	
Majority				
Turnout		1,343	64.3	
Conservative hold		Swing		

Watling Ward (2 Seats)
Party	Candidate	Votes	%	±%
Conservative	David Simmons	1307	23	
Conservative	Ted Wilcox	1260	22	
UKIP	Warren George Wilson	1119	20	
Labour	Catherine Read	806	14	
Labour	Anna Hefferon	707	12	
Green	Viv Moore	486	9	
Majority				
Turnout		5,685	74.2	
Conservative hold		Swing		
Conservative hold		Swing		

West Downs
Party	Candidate	Votes	%	±%
Independent	Monique Bonney	838	51	
Conservative	Keith Ferrin	807	49	
Majority				
Turnout		1,645	78.7	
Independent hold		Swing		

Woodstock Ward (2 Seats)
Party	Candidate	Votes	%	±%
Conservative	Derek Conway	1604	27	
Conservative	George Samuel	1238	21	
UKIP	Lee Burgess	762	13	
UKIP	Ian Davison	692	12	
Labour	James Beer	473	8	
Labour	Shelley Cheesman	458	8	
Liberal Democrats	Ann McLean	332	6	
Independent	Sue Senior	184	3	
Independent	Allyson Spicer	152	3	
Majority				
Turnout		5,895	74.7	
Conservative hold		Swing		
Conservative hold		Swing		

== By-elections between 2015 and 2019 ==
=== Milton Regis ===
A by-election was held in Milton Regis on 3 August 2017 after the death of UKIP councillor Katy Coleman. The seat was gained for Labour by former councillor Tony Winckless with a majority of 318 votes over Conservative candidate Kane Roy Blackwell.

Milton Regis by-election 3 August 2017
Party	Candidate	Votes	%	±%
Labour	Tony Winckless	573	53.7	
Conservative	Kane Roy Blackwell	255	23.9	
UKIP	Richard Frank Palmer	151	14.1	
Liberal Democrats	Tony Clark	86	8.0	
Majority		318	29.8	
Turnout		1,066	23.4	
Labour gain from UKIP		Swing		

=== Sheppey East ===
A by-election was held in Sheppey East on 3 May 2018 after the resignation of Conservative councillor Lesley Ingham. The seat was held for the Conservatives by Lynd Ernest Taylor with a majority of 184 votes over Labour candidate Gill Smith.

Sheppey East by-election 3 May 2018
Party	Candidate	Votes	%	±%
Conservative	Lynd Ernest Taylor	522	46.5	
Labour	Gillian Barbara Smith	338	30.1	
UKIP	Sunatha Nissanga	235	20.9	
Liberal Democrats	Marc Justin Wilson	23	2.0	
Majority		184	16.4	
Turnout		1,121	26.5	
Conservative hold		Swing		

== Changes between 2015 and 2019 ==
UKIP councillor Katy Coleman (Milton Regis) died suddenly on 30 May 2017. At the consequent by-election on 3 August 2017 Labour gained the seat. New councillor Tony Winckless.

Conservative councillor Lesley Ingham (Sheppey East) resigned her seat in March 2018. At the consequent by-election on 3 May 2018 the Conservatives held the seat. New councillor Lynd Taylor.

In April 2018, all 8 remaining UKIP councillors chose to sit as 'The Swale Group'. This was reduced by one on the 7 April 2019 when former UKIP councillor Padmini Nissanga (Sheppey East) was expelled from The Swale Group following accusations of racism and now sits as an independent

== See also ==
- Swale Borough Council elections
