= 2019 Swale Borough Council election =

2019 UK local government election

Elections were held to Swale Borough Council in England as part of the United Kingdom local elections on 2 May 2019.

== Results summary ==
Map showing the political makeup of each ward following the 2019 Swale Borough Council election.

2019 Swale Borough Council election
Party	Candidates	Seats	Gains	Losses	Net gain/loss	Seats %	Votes %	Votes	+/−
Conservative	45	16	0	16	▼16	34.0	34.6	20,472	–4.5
Labour	30	11	7	0	▲7	23.4	23.4	13,845	+1.9
Swale Ind.	16	10	10	0	▲10	21.3	19.9	11,810	N/A
Liberal Democrats	14	5	5	0	▲5	10.6	9.7	5,708	+7.2
Green	9	2	2	0	▲2	4.3	5.7	3,345	+2.8
Independent	6	2	0	0	Steady	4.3	4.6	2,737	–0.7
UKIP	2	1	0	8	▼8	2.1	1.0	611	–27.3
Others	2	0	0	0	Steady	0.0	1.1	670	+1.1

== Ward results ==
=== Abbey ===
Abbey
Party	Candidate	Votes	%	±%
Liberal Democrats	Hannah Perkin	760	45	
Liberal Democrats	Denise Knights	641	38	
Conservative	James Copland	297	18	
Conservative	Mark Evans	285	17	
Labour	Trevor Payne	280	17	
Labour	Anne Salmon	228	14	
UKIP	Jess Valentine	186	11	
Independent	Anita Walker	167	10	
Green	Phil Wyard	167	10	
Green	Henry Stanton	146	9	
Majority				
Turnout				
Liberal Democrats gain from Conservative		Swing		
Liberal Democrats gain from Conservative		Swing		

=== Bobbing, Iwade & Lower Halstow ===
Bobbing, Iwade & Lower Halstow
Party	Candidate	Votes	%	±%
Swale Ind.	Corrie Woodford	852	59	
Conservative	Roger Clark	570	39	
Conservative	Tyrone Ripley	437	30	
Labour	Paul Hurd	305	21	
Majority				
Turnout				
Swale Ind. gain from Conservative		Swing		
Conservative hold		Swing		

=== Borden & Grove Park ===
Borden & Grove Park
Party	Candidate	Votes	%	±%
Swale Ind.	Mike Baldock	1,640	80	
Conservative	Nicholas Hampshire	712	35	
Labour	Geoff Broughton	581	28	
Majority				
Turnout				
Swale Ind. gain from UKIP		Swing		
Conservative hold		Swing		

=== Boughton & Courtenay ===
Boughton & Courtenay
Party	Candidate	Votes	%	±%
Green	Alastair Gould	915	44	
Green	Tim Valentine	825	40	
Swale Ind.	Jeff Tutt	678	33	
Conservative	Andrew Bowles	621	30	
Conservative	Ian Henderson	416	20	
Independent	George Bobbin	287	14	
Majority				
Turnout				
Green gain from Conservative		Swing		
Green gain from Conservative		Swing		

=== Chalkwell ===
Chalkwell
Party	Candidate	Votes	%	±%
Labour	Ghlin Whelan	397	68	
Conservative	Richard Allsep	184	32	
Majority				
Turnout				
Labour hold		Swing		

=== East Downs ===
East Downs
Party	Candidate	Votes	%	±%
Conservative	David Simmons	424	46	
Swale Ind.	Dave Austin	161	17	
Green	Angela Stoddart	159	17	
Labour	Jennifer Reeves	98	11	
Liberal Democrats	Kris Garsed	81	9	
Majority				
Turnout				
Conservative hold		Swing		

=== Hartlip, Newington & Upchurch ===
Hartlip, Newington & Upchurch
Party	Candidate	Votes	%	±%
Swale Ind.	Richard Palmer	1,135	63	
Conservative	Alan Horton	641	36	
Conservative	John Wright	598	33	
Labour	Amy Leggatt	302	17	
Majority				
Turnout				
Swale Ind. gain from Conservative				
Conservative hold		Swing		

=== Homewood ===
Homewood
Party	Candidate	Votes	%	±%
Labour	Roger Truelove	1,166	71	
Labour	Simon Clark	1,045	64	
Conservative	Gareth Randall	438	27	
Conservative	Danielle Hoynes	422	26	
Majority				
Turnout				
Labour hold		Swing		
Labour gain from Conservative		Swing		

=== Kemsley ===
Kemsley
Party	Candidate	Votes	%	±%
Swale Ind.	Derek Carnell	570	50	
Conservative	Mike Dendor	429	38	
Conservative	Samuel Koffie-Williams	340	30	
Labour	Andy Cooper	273	24	
Liberal Democrats	Mary Zeng	204	18	
Majority				
Turnout				
Swale Ind. gain from Conservative				
Conservative hold		Swing		

=== Milton Regis ===
Milton Regis
Party	Candidate	Votes	%	±%
Labour	Tony Winckless	635	52	
Labour	Steve Davey	446	36	
Swale Ind.	Jason Clinch	434	35	
Conservative	Darryl Brown	244	20	
Conservative	Silvia Marin	171	14	
Liberal Democrats	Alexander Stennings	103	8	
Majority				
Turnout				
Labour gain from Conservative		Swing		
Labour hold		Swing		

=== Minster Cliffs ===
Minster Cliffs
Party	Candidate	Votes	%	±%
Swale Ind.	Richard Darby	943	53	
Conservative	Ken Pugh	690	39	
Conservative	Ken Ingleton	646	36	
Conservative	Andy Booth	613	35	
Green	Sam Collins	413	23	
Labour	Tom Nundy	293	17	
Majority				
Turnout				
Swale Ind. gain from UKIP		Swing		
Conservative hold		Swing		
Conservative hold		Swing		

=== Murston ===
Murston
Party	Candidate	Votes	%	±%
Swale Ind.	James Hall	705	57	
Conservative	Ann Hampshire	314	25	
Labour	Ashley Wise	297	24	
Labour	Richard Raycraft	275	22	
Independent	Stephen Young	227	18	
Liberal Democrats	Rosemary Madgwick	124	10	
Majority				
Turnout				
Swale Ind. gain from UKIP		Swing		
Conservative hold		Swing		

=== Priory ===
Priory
Party	Candidate	Votes	%	±%
Liberal Democrats	Benjamin Martin	382	52	
Conservative	Andy Culham	215	29	
Labour	Jennifer Hamilton	86	12	
Green	Peter Hutchinson	55	7	
Majority				
Turnout				
Liberal Democrats gain from Independent		Swing		

=== Queenborough & Halfway ===
Queenborough & Halfway
Party	Candidate	Votes	%	±%
Conservative	Cameron Beart	758	54	
Conservative	Peter Marchington	658	47	
Conservative	Simon Fowle	626	45	
Labour	Matt Brown	475	34	
Labour	Mike Rolfe	423	30	
Centre Progressive	Darren Bullen	340	24	
Majority				
Turnout				
Conservative hold		Swing		
Conservative hold		Swing		
Conservative gain from UKIP				

=== Roman ===
Roman
Party	Candidate	Votes	%	±%
Labour	Tim Gibson	810	58	
Labour	Ken Rowles	739	53	
Conservative	Sarah Aldridge	578	41	
Conservative	Dennis McFarlane	425	31	
Majority				
Turnout				
Labour gain from Conservative		Swing		
Labour gain from UKIP		Swing		

=== Sheerness ===
Sheerness
Party	Candidate	Votes	%	±%
Independent	Lee McCall	807	46	
Labour	Angela Harrison	783	44	
Labour	Mark Ellen	684	39	
Labour	Nicola Nelson	630	36	
Conservative	Steve Ritchie	410	23	
Conservative	Lee-Anne Moore	326	18	
Conservative	Ian Driscoll	316	18	
Majority				
Turnout				
Independent gain from UKIP		Swing		
Labour hold		Swing		
Labour hold		Swing		

=== Sheppey Central ===
Sheppey Central
Party	Candidate	Votes	%	±%
Swale Ind.	Elliott Jayes	1,019	62	
Conservative	Peter MacDonald	488	30	
Conservative	Pete Neal	461	28	
Green	Chris Shipley	383	23	
Labour	Paul Steele	339	21	
Monster Raving Loony	Mad Mike Young	330	20	
Conservative	Trudi Nichols	325	20	
Majority				
Turnout				
Swale Ind. gain from UKIP		Swing		
Conservative hold		Swing		
Conservative hold		Swing		

=== Sheppey East ===
Sheppey East
Party	Candidate	Votes	%	±%
Swale Ind.	Bill Tatton	472	41	
UKIP	Mini Nissanga	425	37	
Conservative	Tina Booth	376	33	
Conservative	Lynd Taylor	339	29	
Labour Co-op	Gill Smith	189	16	
Majority				
Turnout				
Swale Ind. gain from Conservative		Swing		
UKIP hold		Swing		

=== St. Ann's ===
St. Ann's
Party	Candidate	Votes	%	±%
Labour	Carole Jackson	695	41	
Labour	Julian Saunders	621	37	
Conservative	Mike Cosgrove	569	34	
Liberal Democrats	Kris Barker	504	30	
Conservative	Nigel Kay	497	29	
Liberal Democrats	Peter Cook	434	26	
Majority				
Turnout				
Labour gain from Conservative		Swing		
Labour gain from Conservative		Swing		

=== Teynham & Lynsted ===
Teynham & Lynsted
Party	Candidate	Votes	%	±%
Conservative	Lloyd Bowen	640	42	
Conservative	Mike Whiting	495	33	
Swale Ind.	Hari Johnston	490	32	
Swale Ind.	Colin Hopper	419	28	
Green	Janet Bott	282	19	
Labour	Ambrose Nwodoh	259	17	
Liberal Democrats	Carol Morris	135	9	
Majority				
Turnout				
Conservative hold		Swing		
Conservative hold		Swing		

=== The Meads ===
The Meads
Party	Candidate	Votes	%	±%
Conservative	James Hunt	355	56	
Swale Ind.	Michael Page	277	44	
Majority				
Turnout				
Conservative hold		Swing		

=== Watling ===
Watling
Party	Candidate	Votes	%	±%
Liberal Democrats	Ben Martin	1,139	59	
Liberal Democrats	Eddie Thomas	1,093	57	
Conservative	Jane Hawkins	571	30	
Conservative	Geoff Wade	527	27	
Labour	Gareth Reeves	271	14	
Majority				
Turnout				
Liberal Democrats gain from Conservative		Swing		
Liberal Democrats gain from Conservative		Swing		

=== West Downs ===
West Downs
Party	Candidate	Votes	%	±%
Independent	Monique Bonney	899	87	
Conservative	Christine Coles	135	13	
Majority				
Turnout				
Independent hold		Swing		

=== Woodstock ===
Woodstock
Party	Candidate	Votes	%	±%
Swale Ind.	Paul Stephen	1,011	28	
Swale Ind.	Sarah Stephen	1,004	28	
Conservative	Kane Blackwell	466	13	
Conservative	Lee Burgess	424	12	
Independent	Ash Bull	350	10	
Labour	Shelley Cheesman	220	6	
Liberal Democrats	Brenda Hammond	61	2	
Liberal Democrats	Brian Johnson	47	1	
Majority				
Turnout				
Swale Ind. gain from Conservative		Swing		
Swale Ind. gain from Conservative		Swing		

== Changes 2019–2023 ==
- In October 2020, Cllr Denise Knights (Abbey) and Cllr Ben A Martin (Priory) resigned the Liberal Democrat whip and joined the Independent Group.
- In May 2021, Cllr Padmini Nissanga (Sheppey East) left UKIP and joined Reform UK to become their candidate for the Sheppey seat at the 2021 Kent County Council election.
- In July 2021, Cllr Richard Darby (Minster Cliffs) and Cllr Bill Tatton (Sheppey East) resigned the Swale Independents Alliance whip and formed a new group, 'Independents First'.
- In March 2022, Cllr Peter MacDonald (Sheppey Central) resigned the Conservative whip and joined 'Independents First'.
- In April 2022, Cllr Simon Fowle (Queenborough & Halfway) resigned the Conservative whip to sit as an independent.
- In September 2022, Cllr Steve Davey (Milton Regis) resigned the Labour whip and joined the Independent Group.

=== By-elections ===
==== Sheerness ====
A by-election was held in Sheerness on 6 May 2021 after Labour councillor Mark Ellen died suddenly on 18 February 2021. The seat was gained for the Conservative Party by Oliver Marcus Eakin with a majority of 144 votes over Labour Party candidate Nicola Nelson.

Sheerness by-election 6 May 2021
Party	Candidate	Votes	%	±%
Conservative	Oliver Marcus Eakin	648	41.4	
Labour	Nicola Nelson	504	32.2	
Green	Sam Collins	209	13.3	
Swale Ind.	Dolley Jean White	201	12.8	
Majority		144	9.2	
Turnout		1,562	19	
Conservative gain from Labour		Swing		

==== Priory ====
A by-election was held in Priory Ward on 30 September 2021 after Independent councillor Ben A Martin resigned his seat in August 2021. The seat was gained for the Liberal Democrats by Michael Scott Henderson with a majority of 42 votes over Conservative Party candidate Andy Culham.

Priory by-election 30 September 2021
Party	Candidate	Votes	%	±%
Liberal Democrats	Michael Scott Henderson	215	38.0	
Conservative	Andy Culham	173	30.6	
Green	Viv Moore	128	22.7	
Labour	Frances Rehal	49	8.7	
Majority		42	7.4	
Turnout		565	25.8	
Liberal Democrats gain from Independent		Swing		

== See also ==
- Swale Borough Council elections
