= 2010 Swale Borough Council election =

2010 UK local government election

Map of the results of the 2010 Swale Borough Council election. Conservatives in blue and Labour in red. Wards in dark grey were not contested in 2010.

The 2010 Swale Borough Council election took place on 6 May 2010 to elect members of Swale Borough Council in Kent, England. One third of the council was up for election and the Conservative Party stayed in overall control of the council.

After the election, the composition of the council was:

- Conservative 33
- Labour 10
- Liberal Democrats 3
- Independent 1

== Background ==
After the last election in 2008 the Conservatives had a majority on the council with 26 councillors, compared to 9 for Labour, 7 independents and 5 Liberal Democrats. However both the Conservative and Labour parties gained a seat at two by-elections in September 2008, after the independent councillors from Sheppey First resigned from the council.

By the time of the 2010 election there remained only one independent councillor, after Sheppey Central councillor Lesley Ingham joined the Conservatives in October 2009, before Pat Sandle and Paul Sturdgess also became Conservative councillors in March 2010. Meanwhile, the Liberal Democrat group on the council was reduced when St Michael's councillor Nick Williams defected to Labour in October 2009. This meant that before the 2010 election the Conservatives had 31 seats on the council, while Labour had 11, the Liberal Democrats had 4 and there was 1 independent.

== Election result ==
The Conservatives made a net gain of two seats to win 14 of the 17 seats contested. The gains came at the expense of the Labour and Liberal Democrat parties, which each finished one seat down.

The Conservatives took Murston from the Liberal Democrats and Roman from Labour, as well as gaining Sheerness East by a single vote from Labour. However Labour retained Chalkwell with a majority of 30 votes over the Conservatives and gained one of the two seats contested in Queenborough and Halfway from the Conservatives.

Swale local election result 2010
Party	Seats	Gains	Losses	Net gain/loss	Seats %	Votes %	Votes	+/−
Conservative	14	3	1	+2	82.4	50.2	23,751	+4.7%
Labour	3	1	2	-1	17.6	29.5	13,957	+5.8%
Liberal Democrats	0	0	1	-1	0	16.1	7,610	-1.9%
UKIP	0	0	0	0	0	3.7	1,755	+3.7%
Green	0	0	0	0	0	0.6	275	-0.5%

== Ward results ==
Abbey
Party	Candidate	Votes	%	±%
Conservative	Bryan Mulhern	1,227	43.4	+6.1
Labour	Trevor Payne	701	24.8	−1.9
Liberal Democrats	Richard Williams	621	22.0	+8.7
Green	Gary Miller	275	9.7	+9.7
Majority		526	18.6	+8.0
Turnout		2,824	63.5	+28.1
Conservative hold		Swing		

Chalkwell
Party	Candidate	Votes	%	±%
Labour	Roger Truelove	991	41.6	−3.3
Conservative	Emma Bridges	961	40.3	−1.6
Liberal Democrats	David Spurling	432	18.1	+4.9
Majority		30	1.3	−1.7
Turnout		2,384	63.6	+29.7
Labour hold		Swing		

Grove
Party	Candidate	Votes	%	±%
Conservative	Gareth Randall	1,629	49.1	−1.2
Liberal Democrats	Bernie Lowe	732	22.1	+1.4
Labour	Kenneth Rowles	686	20.7	−8.3
UKIP	James Nash	268	8.1	+8.1
Majority		897	27.1	+5.9
Turnout		3,315	63.7	
Conservative hold		Swing		

Hartlip, Newington and Upchurch
Party	Candidate	Votes	%	±%
Conservative	Gerry Lewin	1,745	54.0	−12.9
Labour	Ruth Walker-Grice	514	15.9	−0.8
Liberal Democrats	Anne Jenkins	511	15.8	−0.6
UKIP	Richard Palmer	460	14.2	+14.2
Majority		1,231	38.1	−12.1
Turnout		3,230	72.5	
Conservative hold		Swing		

Kemsley
Party	Candidate	Votes	%	±%
Conservative	Brenda Simpson	1,743	55.8	−9.8
Labour	Martin McCusker	766	24.5	+1.8
Liberal Democrats	Mary Zeng	616	19.7	+8.0
Majority		977	31.3	−11.6
Turnout		3,125	62.7	+36.3
Conservative hold		Swing		

Minster Cliffs
Party	Candidate	Votes	%	±%
Conservative	Ken Pugh	2,141	57.7	+11.3
Labour	Libby Tucker	1,013	27.3	+11.3
UKIP	Alison Donkin	557	15.0	+15.0
Majority		1,128	30.4	+15.4
Turnout		3,711	64.5	+33.0
Conservative hold		Swing		

Murston
Party	Candidate	Votes	%	±%
Conservative	Ed Gent	845	39.2	+15.0
Liberal Democrats	Keith Nevols	695	32.2	−25.8
Labour	Shelley Cheesman	618	28.6	+10.8
Majority		150	7.0	
Turnout		2,158	56.3	+31.4
Conservative gain from Liberal Democrats		Swing		

Queenborough and Halfway (2 seats)
Party	Candidate	Votes	%	±%
Conservative	Richard Darby	1,548		
Labour	Jackie Constable	1,504		
Conservative	Mick Galvin	1,316		
Labour	Sean Dalton	1,092		
Turnout		5,460	60.8	+27.3
Conservative hold		Swing		
Labour gain from Conservative		Swing		

Roman
Party	Candidate	Votes	%	±%
Conservative	Lloyd Bowen	982	44.2	+14.4
Labour	Simon Clark	813	36.6	−21.6
Liberal Democrats	David Philips	425	19.1	+7.1
Majority		169	7.6	
Turnout		2,220	60.7	+31.0
Conservative gain from Labour		Swing		

Sheerness East
Party	Candidate	Votes	%	±%
Conservative	Chris Foulds	687	38.7	+16.5
Labour	Mark Ellen	686	38.6	+6.8
Liberal Democrats	Colin Howe	403	22.7	+11.8
Majority		1	0.1	
Turnout		1,776	50.9	+24.0
Conservative gain from Labour		Swing		

Sheerness West
Party	Candidate	Votes	%	±%
Labour	Angela Harrison	839	40.4	−9.1
Conservative	Dave Wilson	768	37.0	+20.0
Liberal Democrats	David Kemp	469	22.6	+22.6
Majority		71	3.4	−12.6
Turnout		2,076	51.5	+21.3
Labour hold		Swing		

Sheppey Central
Party	Candidate	Votes	%	±%
Conservative	John Morris	2,333	63.3	+29.4
Labour	Dennis Grover	1,354	36.7	+21.5
Majority		979	26.6	
Turnout		3,687	69.7	+42.2
Conservative hold		Swing		

St Anns
Party	Candidate	Votes	%	±%
Conservative	Mike Cosgrove	1,305	47.8	+6.8
Labour	Paul Durkin	733	26.8	+5.3
Liberal Democrats	David Evans	693	25.4	+14.6
Majority		572	20.9	+6.5
Turnout		2,731	69.2	+33.6
Conservative hold		Swing		

Teynham and Lynsted
Party	Candidate	Votes	%	±%
Conservative	Trevor Fentiman	1,482	55.2	−4.9
Labour	David Feltham	556	20.7	−6.9
Liberal Democrats	Dave Manning	458	17.1	+4.8
UKIP	Aaron Donkin	188	7.0	+7.0
Majority		926	34.5	+2.0
Turnout		2,684	66.3	+32.6
Conservative hold		Swing		

Watling
Party	Candidate	Votes	%	±%
Conservative	Ted Wilcox	1,411	49.9	−9.4
Liberal Democrats	Mike Wheeler	899	31.8	+21.2
Labour	Judith Webb	517	18.3	+4.8
Majority		512	18.1	−24.5
Turnout		2,827	69.7	+29.4
Conservative hold		Swing		

Woodstock
Party	Candidate	Votes	%	±%
Conservative	Alan Willicombe	1,628	51.8	−3.8
Liberal Democrats	Peter Springham	656	20.9	+3.5
Labour	Geraldine Feltham	574	18.3	−1.8
UKIP	Lee Burgess	282	9.0	+9.0
Majority		972	31.0	−4.5
Turnout		3,140	78.1	+33.3
Conservative hold		Swing		
