= 2000 Swale Borough Council election =

2000 UK local government election

The 2000 Swale Borough Council election took place on 4 May 2000 to elect members of Swale Borough Council in Kent, England. One third of the council was up for election and the council remained under no overall control.

After the election, the composition of the council was:

- Liberal Democrats 22
- Conservative 15
- Labour 12

== Election result ==
Swale local election result 2000
Party	Seats	Gains	Losses	Net gain/loss	Seats %	Votes %	Votes	+/−
Conservative	9			+6	56.3			
Liberal Democrats	6			-1	37.5			
Labour	1			-5	6.3			

== By-elections between 2000 and 2002 ==
Eastern by-election 25 January 2001
Party	Candidate	Votes	%	±%
Conservative	Christopher Boden	426	40.0	−18.9
Liberal Democrats	Geoffrey Partis	312	29.3	+14.0
Labour	Barry Watson	292	27.4	+6.8
Rock 'n' Roll Loony	Andrew Gomershall	36	3.4	−1.8
Majority		114	10.7	
Turnout		1,066	27.7	
Conservative hold		Swing		
