= 2008 Swale Borough Council election =

2008 UK local government election

Map of the results of the 2008 Swale Borough Council election. Conservatives in blue, Liberal Democrats in yellow, Labour in red and Sheppey First in grey. Wards in dark grey were not contested in 2008.

The 2008 Swale Borough Council election took place on 1 May 2008 to elect members of Swale Borough Council in Kent, England. One third of the council was up for election and the Conservative Party stayed in overall control of the council.

After the election, the composition of the council was:

- Conservative 26
- Labour 9
- Independent 7
- Liberal Democrats 5

== Background ==
16 of the 47 seats on the council were contested in 2008, with the Conservatives defending 9 seats, the Liberal Democrats 4 seats and Labour 3 seats. A total of 53 people contested the election and as well as candidates from the main political parties, there were also 2 candidates from Sheppey First standing on the Isle of Sheppey and 2 candidates from Faversham First contesting wards in Faversham.

== Election result ==
The Conservative majority on the council was increased by one seat after gaining three seats, but also losing two seats. Both Labour and the Liberal Democrats had a net loss of one seat, while Sheppey First gained a seat.

The Conservatives picked up two seats from the Liberal Democrats in Minster Cliffs and St Michaels and one seat from Labour in Queenborough and Halfway. However the Liberal Democrats took one seat from the Conservatives in Davington Priory, while Sheppey First also gained a seat from the Conservatives in Sheppey Central.

Swale local election result 2008
Party	Seats	Gains	Losses	Net gain/loss	Seats %	Votes %	Votes	+/−
Conservative	10	3	2	+1	62.5	45.5	9,681	+4.5%
Liberal Democrats	3	1	2	-1	18.8	18.0	3,827	+5.1%
Labour	2	0	1	-1	12.5	23.7	5,044	+0.9%
Sheppey First	1	1	0	+1	6.3	6.3	1,341	-11.9%
Faversham First	0	0	0	0	0	4.5	959	+4.5%
Green	0	0	0	0	0	1.1	226	+0.0%
Monster Raving Loony	0	0	0	0	0	0.7	156	+0.2%
Independent	0	0	0	0	0	0.3	57	-2.5%

== Ward results ==
Abbey
Party	Candidate	Votes	%	±%
Conservative	Anita Walker	512	37.3	−7.1
Labour	Trevor Payne	367	26.7	−4.3
Faversham First	Jenny Gurney	311	22.7	+22.7
Liberal Democrats	Martin Bellis	182	13.3	−3.6
Majority		145	10.6	−2.8
Turnout		1,372	35.4	−1.0
Conservative hold		Swing		

Boughton and Courtenay
Party	Candidate	Votes	%	±%
Conservative	Andrew Bowles	1,112	70.7	+4.0
Labour	Fran Rehal	234	14.9	−1.2
Green	Timothy Valentine	226	14.4	−0.3
Majority		878	55.9	+5.3
Turnout		1,572	37.4	+1.3
Conservative hold		Swing		

Chalkwell
Party	Candidate	Votes	%	±%
Labour	Ghlin Whelan	577	44.9	−3.0
Conservative	Derek Carnell	538	41.9	+12.6
Liberal Democrats	David Spurling	170	13.2	−1.1
Majority		39	3.0	−15.6
Turnout		1,285	33.9	−2.0
Labour hold		Swing		

Davington Priory
Party	Candidate	Votes	%	±%
Liberal Democrats	Michael Henderson	495	58.2	+58.2
Conservative	John Winlow	235	27.6	−38.1
Labour	Brenda Chester	121	14.2	−20.1
Majority		260	30.6	
Turnout		851	44.3	+7.3
Liberal Democrats gain from Conservative		Swing		

East Downs
Party	Candidate	Votes	%	±%
Conservative	Colin Prescott	683	77.6	+0.7
Labour	Catherine Read	197	22.4	−0.7
Majority		486	55.2	+1.4
Turnout		880	41.4	−4.9
Conservative hold		Swing		

Iwade and Lower Halstow
Party	Candidate	Votes	%	±%
Conservative	Ben Stokes	613	58.5	+17.1
Liberal Democrats	Dave Manning	266	25.4	−11.8
Labour	Ruth Walker-Grice	168	16.0	−5.4
Majority		347	33.1	+28.9
Turnout		1,047	34.7	−9.8
Conservative hold		Swing		

Kemsley
Party	Candidate	Votes	%	±%
Conservative	Susan Gent	855	65.6	+3.9
Labour	Martin McCusker	296	22.7	−0.2
Liberal Democrats	June Hammond	153	11.7	−3.7
Majority		559	42.9	+4.1
Turnout		1,304	26.4	−1.9
Conservative hold		Swing		

Milton Regis
Party	Candidate	Votes	%	±%
Liberal Democrats	Elvie Lowe	428	37.5	+6.3
Labour	Tony Winckless	370	32.4	−9.3
Conservative	Michael Dendor	240	21.0	+3.1
Independent	Andrew Crayford	57	5.0	−0.4
Monster Raving Loony	Sheikh Mihand	46	4.0	+0.1
Majority		58	5.1	
Turnout		1,141	32.8	−1.7
Liberal Democrats hold		Swing		

Minster Cliffs
Party	Candidate	Votes	%	±%
Conservative	Adrian Crowther	827	46.4	+24.4
Liberal Democrats	Mike Brown	559	31.4	+27.4
Labour	Libby Tucker	286	16.0	+7.2
Monster Raving Loony	'Mad' Mike Young	110	6.2	+4.0
Majority		268	15.0	
Turnout		1,782	31.5	−6.3
Conservative gain from Liberal Democrats		Swing		

Murston
Party	Candidate	Votes	%	±%
Liberal Democrats	Dave Banks	552	58.0	+10.7
Conservative	Patricia Martin	230	24.2	+2.3
Labour	Ken Rowles	169	17.8	−13.0
Majority		322	33.9	+17.4
Turnout		951	24.9	−2.1
Liberal Democrats hold		Swing		

Queenborough and Halfway
Party	Candidate	Votes	%	±%
Conservative	Paul Hayes	737	40.0	+7.0
Labour	Jackie Constable	618	33.5	−7.1
Sheppey First	Amanda Elliott	489	26.5	+0.1
Majority		119	6.5	
Turnout		1,844	33.5	−1.2
Conservative gain from Labour		Swing		

Roman
Party	Candidate	Votes	%	±%
Labour	Mike Haywood	633	58.2	+10.3
Conservative	Mike Whiting	324	29.8	−4.3
Liberal Democrats	Anne Jenkins	131	12.0	−6.0
Majority		309	28.4	+14.6
Turnout		1,088	29.7	−5.1
Labour hold		Swing		

Sheppey Central
Party	Candidate	Votes	%	±%
Sheppey First	Paul Sturdgess	852	50.9	+5.6
Conservative	Andy Booth	568	33.9	+2.1
Labour	David Sargent	254	15.2	+0.2
Majority		284	17.0	+3.5
Turnout		1,674	27.5	−0.3
Sheppey First gain from Conservative		Swing		

St Ann's
Party	Candidate	Votes	%	±%
Conservative	Mark Baldock	582	41.0	−9.3
Faversham First	Findlay MacDonald	378	26.6	+26.6
Labour	Paul Durkin	306	21.5	+2.6
Liberal Democrats	David Evans	154	10.8	−12.2
Majority		204	14.4	−12.9
Turnout		1,420	35.6	0.0
Conservative hold		Swing		

St Michael's
Party	Candidate	Votes	%	±%
Conservative	Derek Conway	665	45.5	+7.2
Liberal Democrats	Brenda Hammond	566	38.8	−8.0
Labour	Christine Truelove	229	15.7	+0.9
Majority		99	6.7	
Turnout		1,460	36.7	−0.6
Conservative gain from Liberal Democrats		Swing		

Watling
Party	Candidate	Votes	%	±%
Conservative	David Simmons	960	59.3	−7.4
Faversham First	Tracey Smith	270	16.7	+16.7
Labour	Philip Dangerfield	219	13.5	−1.4
Liberal Democrats	Paul Hurd	171	10.6	−7.8
Majority		690	42.6	−5.7
Turnout		1,620	40.3	−2.7
Conservative hold		Swing		

== By-elections between 2008 and 2010 ==
=== Minster Cliffs ===
A by-election was held in Minster Cliffs on 25 September 2008 after the resignation of Sheppey First councillor Chris Boden. The seat was gained for the Conservatives by Andy Booth with a majority of 221 votes over Sheppey First candidate Ray Adams.

Minster Cliffs by-election 25 September 2008
Party	Candidate	Votes	%	±%
Conservative	Andy Booth	549	48.0	+1.6
Sheppey First	Ray Adams	328	28.7	+28.7
Labour	Libby Tucker	204	17.8	+1.8
Liberal Democrats	Dave Manning	63	5.5	−25.9
Majority		221	19.3	+4.3
Turnout		1,144	19.8	−11.7
Conservative gain from Sheppey First		Swing		

=== Sheerness East ===
A by-election was held in Sheerness East on 25 September 2008 after the resignation of Sheppey First councillor Gemma Wray. The seat was gained by Labour candidate David Sargent with a majority of 149 votes over Liberal Democrat Colin Howe.

Sheerness East by-election 25 September 2008
Party	Candidate	Votes	%	±%
Labour	David Sargent	326	38.5	+6.7
Liberal Democrats	Colin Howe	177	20.9	+10.0
Conservative	Martin Goodhew	173	20.4	−1.8
Sheppey First	Mark Rogers	171	20.2	−14.9
Majority		149	17.6	
Turnout		847	23.1	−3.8
Labour gain from Sheppey First		Swing		

=== Teynham and Lynsted ===
A by-election was held in Teynham and Lynsted on 2 October 2008 after the death of Conservative councillor John Disney. The seat was held by Conservative Trevor Fentiman with a majority of 274 votes over Labour candidate Ken Rowles.

Teynham and Lynsted by-election 2 October 2008
Party	Candidate	Votes	%	±%
Conservative	Trevor Fentiman	463	63.4	+3.3
Labour	Ken Rowles	189	25.9	−1.7
Liberal Democrats	Brenda Hammond	78	10.7	−1.6
Majority		274	37.5	+5.0
Turnout		730	17.6	−16.1
Conservative hold		Swing		
