= Rock 'n' Roll Loony Party =

- Leader: Chris "Screwy" Driver
- Founded: 2000; 26 years ago
- Split from: Official Monster Raving Loony Party
- Headquarters: Cannock
- Ideology: Satire

The Rock 'n' Roll Loony Party was a minor political party in the United Kingdom.

Founded in 2000, the group split from the Official Monster Raving Loony Party after the death of Screaming Lord Sutch. Stephen Ingle claims that it was formed by librarians. It was initially based in Cannock, at the Laughing Leopards pub, which was run by its joint deputy leader, while its leader was Chris "Screwy" Driver.

Driver was elected to Queenborough Town Council, on the Isle of Sheppey in Kent, in 2000 as a Monster Raving Loony candidate, and then in his new party colours was voted in as Mayor of Queenborough in 2002. In elections to Swale Borough Council in 2003, one of the Rock 'n' Roll Loony Party candidates polled more than a member of the Liberal Democrats.

At the 2005 General Election the party fielded one candidate, in Sittingbourne and Sheppey, who managed to poll more votes than the Veritas candidate. It was deregistered in August 2007.

The party's main policies included free beer and sex for pensioners, and the construction of laughter clinics.

== See also ==
- List of frivolous political parties
- Raving Loony Green Giant Party
