= Amberley, West Sussex =

Village and parish in West Sussex, England

Coordinates: 50.90848°N 0.53404°W

Amberley
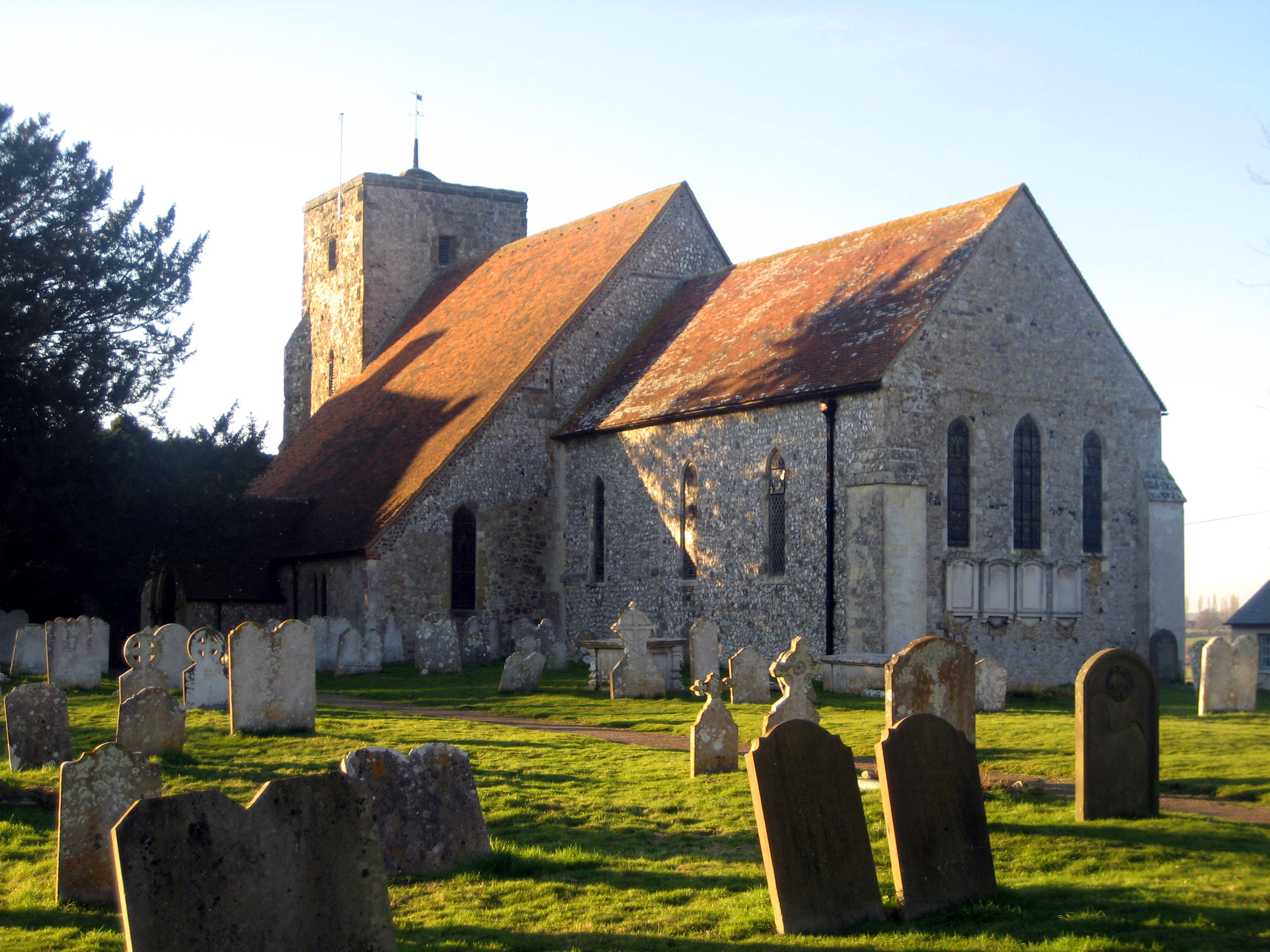
- Church of St. Michael

- Location within West Sussex
- Area: 11.79 km^{2} (4.55 sq mi)
- Population: 533 2001 Census; 586 (2011 Census including North Stoke)
  - Density: 45/km^{2} (120/sq mi)
- OS grid reference: TQ031131
  - London: 45 miles (72 km) NNE
- Civil parish: Amberley
- District: Horsham
- Shire county: West Sussex
- Region: South East
- Country: England
- Sovereign state: United Kingdom
- Post town: ARUNDEL
- Postcode district: BN18
- Dialling code: 01798
- Police: Sussex
- Fire: West Sussex
- Ambulance: South East Coast
- UK Parliament: Arundel and South Downs

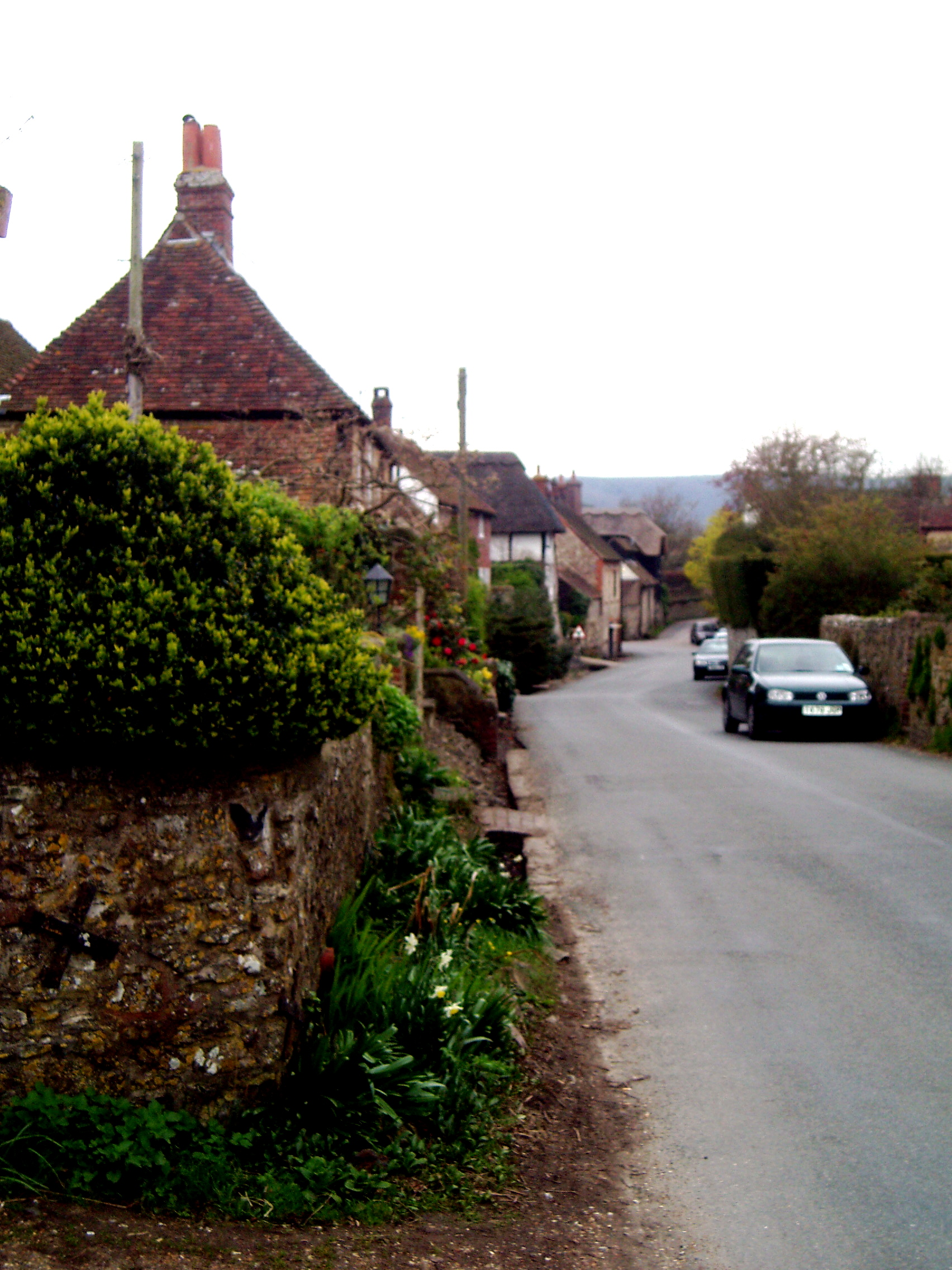
Amberley village

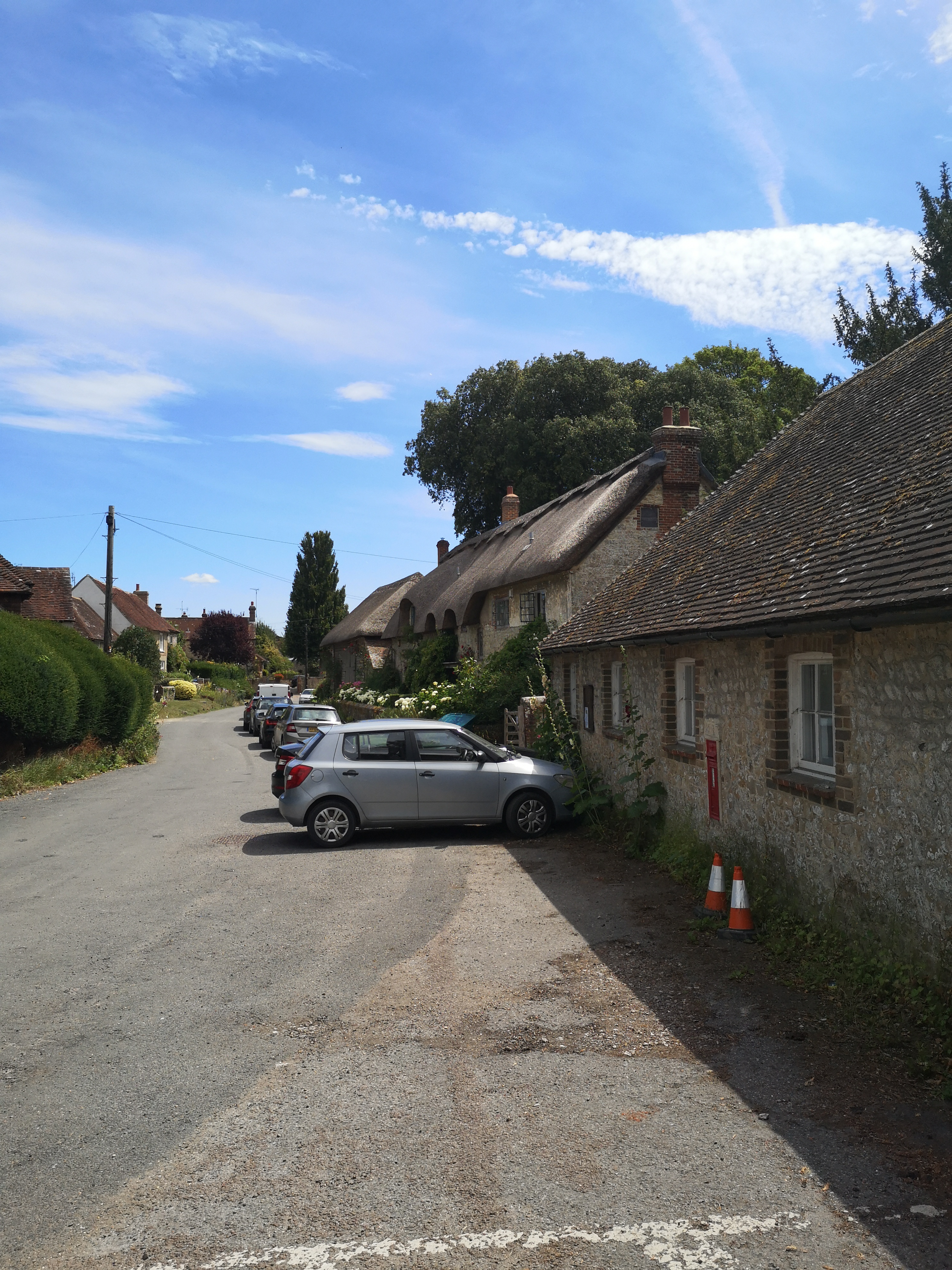
Thatched cottages, Amberley, July 2020

Amberley is a village and civil parish in the Horsham District of West Sussex, England. It is situated at the foot of the South Downs, 4 miles (6 km) north of Arundel. Its neighbours are Storrington and West Chiltington. The village is noted for its thatched cottages. A house named "The Thatched House" is one of the village's few non-thatched houses.

One of the attractions is Amberley Working Museum.

Amberley has a railway station on the Arun Valley Line, with regular services to Bognor Regis, Portsmouth and London.

To the north of the village is the tidal plain of the River Arun, known as Amberley Wild Brooks. The wetland is a Site of Special Scientific Interest which floods in winter and is known for its wildfowl. Amberley Castle is now a hotel. The castle was a fortified manor house next to which is the Norman St Michael's Church.

== Cultural links ==
William Champion Streatfeild, who became Bishop of Lewes was vicar of Amberley with Houghton from 1897 to 1902. His daughter, the children's novelist Noel Streatfeild, spent part of her childhood there. These may have been the happiest years of her childhood.

Arnold Bennett's stay in the village for eight weeks in 1926 is documented in his journals. During May–June 1926, he wrote the last two thirds of The Vanguard in 44 days, noting I have never worked more easily than in the last six weeks. He also met John Cowper Powys who walked over the Downs from Burpham to visit him. Frank Swinnerton lived in Cranleigh and had links with Bennett, subsequently selecting and editing his journals. Swinnerton's 1914 novel On the Staircase has a character named Amberley. Arthur Rackham is commemorated in a wall plaque in the churchyard. The lettercutting is by John Skelton. Rackham and his artist wife Edyth lived at Houghton House on the other side of the valley throughout the 1920s. In 1932, the film The Man from Toronto starring Jessie Matthews and Ian Hunter was filmed here.

There is a memorial in the churchyard to Edward Stott ARA who lived in Amberley from 1889 until he died in 1918. He is noted for his rural scenes, many sketched close to Amberley. His monument has a bust on top carved by the sculptor Francis Derwent Wood. Wood's grave is marked with one of his own works, a pietà bas-relief in bronze. Inside the church is a semi-circular stained-glass window to Stott, designed by Robert Anning Bell. Other windows have inscriptions by Eric Gill and his assistant Joseph Cribb. In the church, south of the chancel arch are 12th or 13th century wall-paintings, depicting scenes from the Passion Cycle.

Amberley Working Museum was used as a set location for the James Bond film A View to a Kill as "Mainstrike Mine".

== Local history ==
The Pepper Papers (1899–1978) give an insight into Amberley's history as a producer of Lime, with 1904 correspondence between Peppers and companies interested in shipping Amberley chalk to North America. In 1929–35, a campaign tried to prevent the despoliation of Amberley by the erection of pylons and overhead power cables, looking at the financing of the alternative scheme of laying low tension underground cables. Frank Pepper had regular correspondence with Arthur Rackham who had lived nearby, and John Galsworthy from Bury, West Sussex regarding the campaign to save Bury Coombe. Letters between 1926 and 1959 document claims to a public right of way over a footpath through the Amberley Castle grounds.

== Notable people ==
- James Butler (1651–1696), politician
- Gladys Huntington (1887–1959), writer
- Jeremy Maas (1928–1997), art dealer and art historian
- Arthur Rackham (1867–1939), illustrator
- Edyth Starkie (1867–1941), artist
- Hilary Stratton (1906–1985), sculptor
- Edward Stott (1855–1918), painter
