= William Stott (artist) =

English painter (1857–1900)

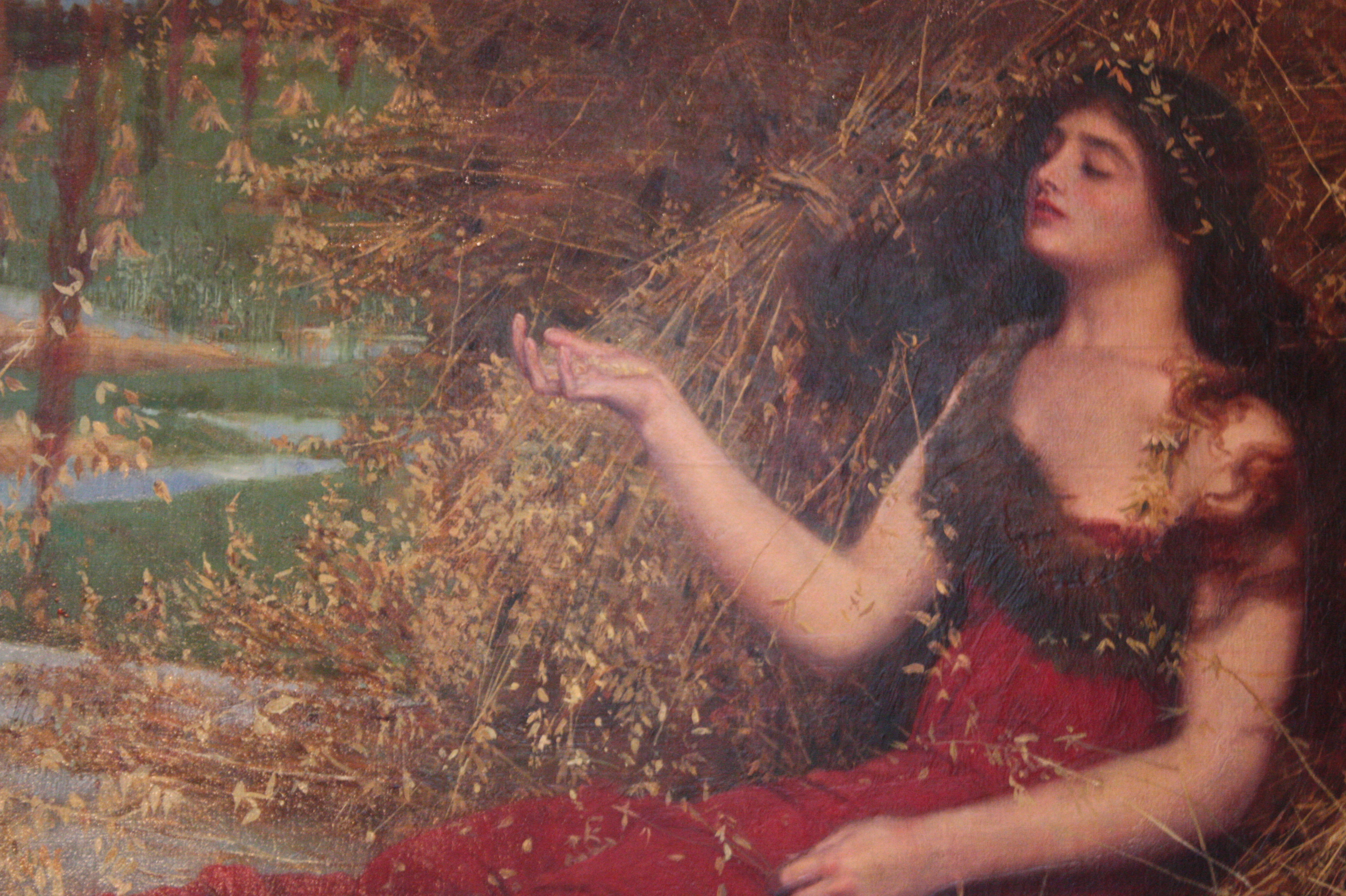
Autumn by William Stott of Oldham, 1898 (detail)

William Stott (20 November 1857 – 25 February 1900) was a painter born in Oldham, Lancashire, England. He is often known as William Stott of Oldham.

== Life ==
He was born on the 20 November 1857, the son of an Oldham cotton mill owner.

After studying in Oldham and Manchester School of Art he went to Paris and studied under the French painter Jean-Léon Gérôme. He achieved rapid success, exhibiting regularly at the Paris Salon. He was an influential member of the artists' colony at Grez-sur-Loing which was popular with English, Irish, Scottish and American artists. It was here that he painted Le Passeur, now obtained by the Tate. In 1889 he held a one-man show at the Durand-Ruel Gallery, famous for its showing of the French Impressionists. On his return to England he became a follower and close friend of the painter James Abbott McNeill Whistler, until his painting of Whistler's mistress depicted naked as 'Venus Born of the Sea Foam' caused a rift between them.

For much of his career, Stott painted landscapes, but during the late 1880s began to move towards pictures involving classical figures and allegorical themes, such as The Nymph of 1886, and The Birth of Venus of 1887. He worked in oils, watercolours and pastels, a medium appropriate to his atmospheric post Impressionistic style.

From the year 1882, Stott always signed himself 'of Oldham' – both to distinguish himself from another Lancastrian son of a mill-owner, Edward Stott ARA (1855–1918) and to acknowledge his proud Oldham roots.

Walter Richard Sickert described him as "one of the two greatest living painters of the world."

He died unexpectedly whilst travelling on a ferry from London to Belfast on 25 February 1900.

== Works ==
- Le Passeur (The Ferryman) (1881), Tate Britain
- Girl in a Meadow, Tate Gallery
- Awakening of the Spirit of the Rose, Manchester Art Gallery
- A Summer's Day, Manchester Art Gallery
- Portrait of Mrs William Stott, Manchester Art Gallery
- The Alps at Night, Walker Art Gallery in Liverpool
- An October Morning, National Gallery of Ireland in Dublin
- Portrait of T. Millie Dow, National Gallery of Scotland in Edinburgh
- My Father and Mother, Gallery Oldham
- The White Mountain, Gallery Oldham
- Venus Born of the Sea Foam, Gallery Oldham
- A Freshet, Gallery Oldham
- Pastoral, Gallery Oldham
