= Gladys Huntington =

American writer

Gladys Theodora Huntington
- Born: 13 December 1887; Philadelphia, United States of America
- Died: 31 May 1959 (aged 71); Westminster, London, England, United Kingdom
- Other name: Gladys Parrish
- Occupations: Writer, dramatist and playwright

Gladys Huntington (13 December 1887 – 31 May 1959), née Parrish, was an American writer. Huntington's works include the novel Carfrae's Comedy, the play Barton's Folly, and the bestselling book Madame Solario.

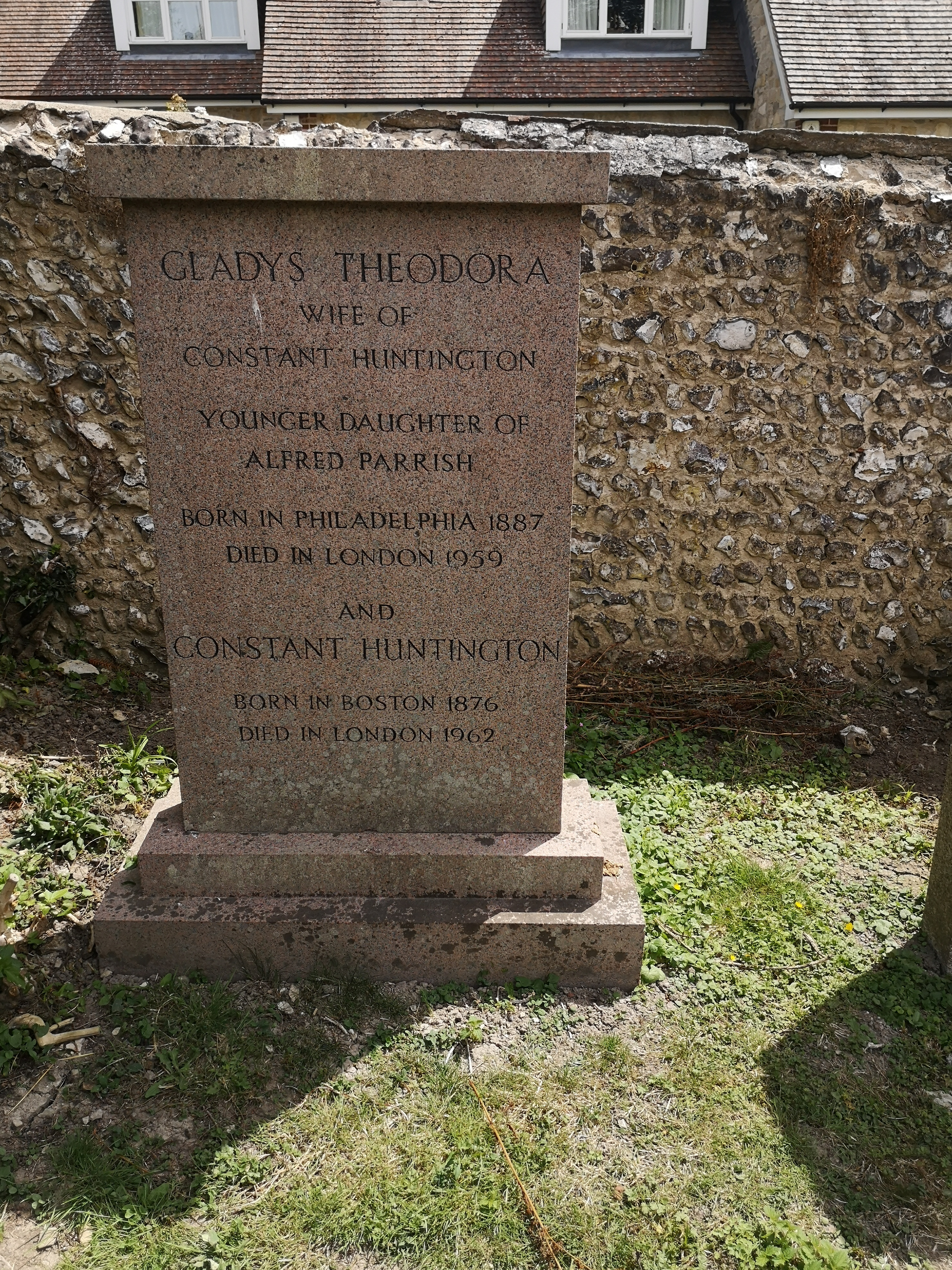
Memorial stone of Gladys Huntington, Amberley, West Sussex, England

== Biography ==
Huntington was born Gladys Theodora Parrish in Philadelphia to a Quaker family on 13 December 1887. Her parents were Alfred Parrish and Katharine Broadwood Jennings. From a young age, she lived in New York, Paris, London, Biarritz, Rome, and "a villa on Lake Como."

She married Boston native Constant Davis Huntington on 17 October 1916. The two moved to London where Constant opened Putnam's London office. The two resided in Hyde Park Gardens and then at Amberley House in Sussex, where they remained until her death.

On 31 May 1959, three years after the publication of Madame Solario, Huntington committed suicide.

== Writing ==
Huntington published two novels, a play, and two short stories in The New Yorker. She is best known for Madame Solario. The novel was anonymously published in 1956 (likely due to what was considered scandalous content), and her identity as the author would not be revealed for three decades. It is mainly thanks to the French journalist and novelist Bernard Cohen, who investigated in 2009, that Huntington was recognized as Madame Solario's author. The book was immediately republished in France with the author's name on the cover. The story takes place in Cadenabbia on Lake Como in 1906.

The novel has been translated into seven languages. However, it went out of print for a period of time. Persephone Books released a new edition in 2016 with a foreword by Alison Adburgham. It was adapted into a French film by René Féret in 2012.

The book was considered a masterpiece by Marguerite Yourcenar, who discussed it on several occasions in her correspondence. In a segment on neglected books, Mary Renault in The American Scholar praised the book and called it "one of the finest novels of our century." In a letter, Paul Bowles called it "beautifully imagined and written," adding, "What a shame that the author never wrote anything else! And didn't even dare sign her name to it for fear of scandalizing her British in-laws. (She was American, of course!)"

When Penguin published the novel in paperback in 1978, The New York Times wrote, "When first published 1956, this anonymous novel was acclaimed for its elegant style and disturbing urgency. It deserves a new audience."

Huntington's prose is often compared to that of Henry James. After her death, Huntington left behind a manuscript of a play entitled The Ladies’ Mile (dating from 1944), which she had planned to adapt into a novel.

== Works ==
- Carfrae's Comedy (1915)
- Madame Solario (1956)
