= William Henry Gore =

English artist known for painting (1857–1942)

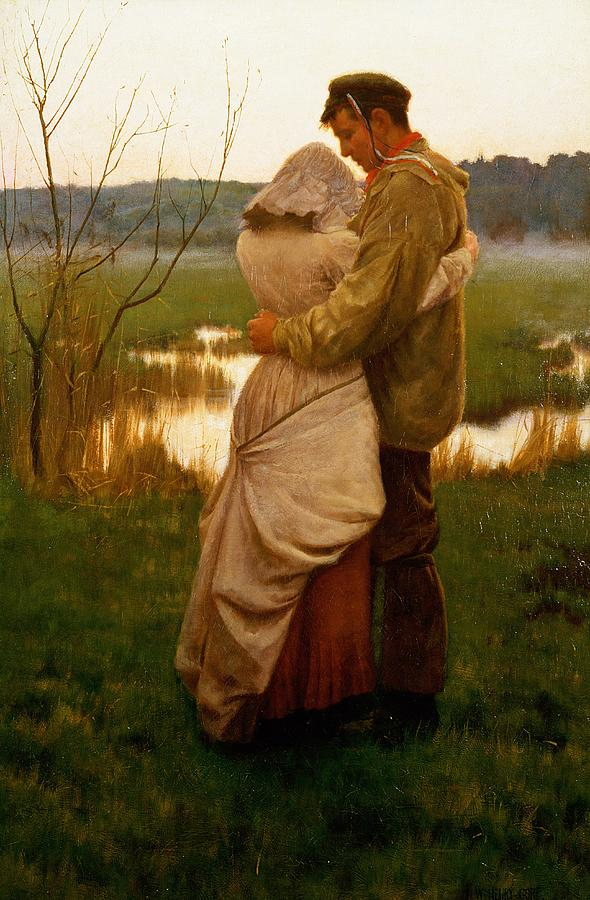
- Born: 3 September 1857; Speenhamland, Berkshire, England
- Died: 5 May 1942 (aged 84); Newbury, Berkshire, England
- Education: Lambeth School of Art, Royal Academy of Arts
- Known for: Oil painting, Watercolours,
- Notable work: In The Gloaming (1896), Forgive Our Trespasses (1897), The Culprit (1900)
- Movement: Landscape painting, Victorian Genre painting.
- Awards: Royal Society of British Artists, Royal Institute of Painters in Watercolours, Royal Institute of Oil Painters

William Henry Gore RI (1857–1942) was an English painter and watercolourist of the late Victorian period to the early Twentieth Century. He is known for his rural landscapes of his native Berkshire and for his petit genre paintings of children and animals. Gore was in the tradition of late Victorian Romanticism and Naturalism that flourished in the period before the turn of the Twentieth Century but which quickly became unfashionable in the aftermath of the Great War and the social and political changes that followed.

== Biography ==
W.H.Gore spent the majority of his commercial working life in Berkshire town of Newbury and in the surrounding countryside of his native Berkshire. He was born in September 1857 in Speenhamland, now a contiguous part of Newbury. He was the only son of three children to George Gore (1821-1864), a painter, plumber and decorator and Clara (known as Eliza) Gore (née Chubb). His Father’s death when W H Gore was seven years old witnessed the family moving to their uncle William Chubb’s house in Speenhamland. The family were staunch members of the local Congregation Church and Gore remained attached to the church until his death. He received his early art training in the Lambeth School of Art, from which he entered the Royal Academy schools in 1880 and during the next twenty years he exhibited twenty nine paintings but only three in the period 1900 - 1914.

Gore was a student at the Royal Academy for five years until 1885 coinciding with the start of the long Presidency of Frederic Leighton. At the Royal Academy he studied a mixture of drawing from Greek and Roman sculpture, anatomy and perspective painting using live models. One of Gore’s prime influences during this period was the realism of the Pre-Raphaelite Brotherhood and in particular John Everett Millais who succeeded briefly as President of the Royal Academy in 1886 (He died just three months after his election). Following Gore's academic days he returned to Berkshire and from 1898 he had moved back to his Mother’s house where he continued to live and work in a studio in the grounds until his death in 1942. He did not marry and chose to live a quiet, contemplative life centred on his boyhood church. Gore was a member of the Royal Society of British Artists from 1893 to 1913 exhibiting around ninety works during which he entered Stolen Kisses are the Sweetest in the St Louis Exhibition and Sympathy in the 1906 New Zealand Exhibition. Gore was also a member of the Royal Institute of Painters in Water Colours and the Royal Institute of Oil Painters.

Gore remained an active painter until he turned 70 in 1927. He died on 5 May 1942.

== Landscape and rural scenes paintings ==
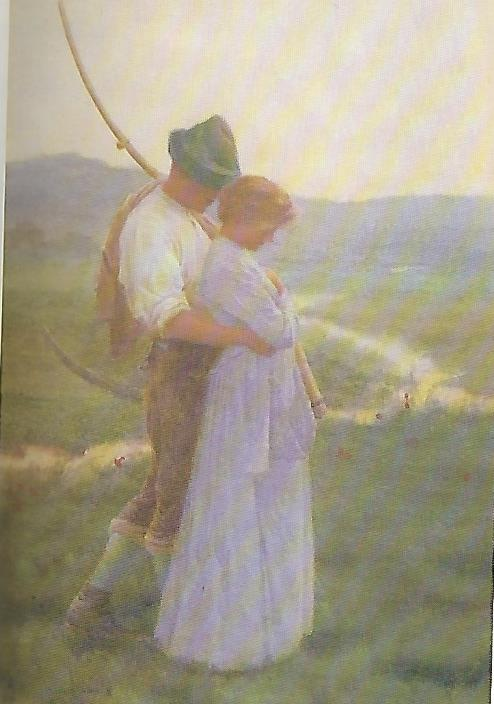
In The Gloaming (1886

Many of W.H. Gore’s rural paintings display a nostalgic view of the nearby Kennet Valley and the surrounding Berkshire countryside. The influence of the French Barbizon School of realism and in particular the work of Jean-François Millet and François-Louis Français is evident in his work. The heyday of the Barbizon School was over by c 1870 but Gore incorporates some of the prominent features of the French school in the use of: colour, softness of form and in tonal qualities. Two works by Millet The Angelus a painting of two figures standing during a contemplative moment and The Gleaners the latter portraying the figures toiling in the landscape were well known to late Victorians and their symbolic content influenced Gore in his depiction of rural life. Paintings from the 1880s such as: Listed from the Guildhall collection in London and a watercolour In The Gloaming are intimate portrayals of Late Victorian romantic painting. Listed (sic) depicts two young lovers in sad reflection of the prospect of a young man joining up with his regiment. The ribbons in his cap refer to the custom of new recruits wearing their regimental colours to denote their willingness to be shot at for sixpence a day. The pathos of the idea expressed moved H. Stacy Marks, R.A., who was a member of the Council of the Royal Academy, to tears such was its effect on his sensibilities. Marks reaction provides an insight into the mind-set of many Victorians. In The Gloaming sees two lovers by the River Kennet in tender proximity to each other. These were themes that Gore returned to throughout his painting career.

They provided him with a reasonable living but by the end of his life they were unfashionable and no longer in demand. They appealed to a late Victorian sensibility that the values of a Merrie England of bucolic contentment still existed. The reality was that the Berkshire countryside, along with the rest of the British countryside, was irrevocably changing. The 1880s were a time of an economic recession in the English countryside that lasted for most of the Nineteenth Century with many thousands of poorly paid agricultural workers leaving the land for the towns and the cities and with their exodus many of the rural trades and skills also disappeared The hardships of rural life are generally missing from Gore’s rural paintings. Nevertheless there is a subtle poignancy within paintings such as The Wood Gatherers (Royal Academy 1897) and Rising Moon (Royal Academy 1908) with its echoes of Linnell and Constable.

W.H. Gore's landscapes without figures display an abiding affinity for the Berkshire countryside. The area of the River Kennet valley lies within flat pastures, moors and meadows and provided scope for panoramas of watery meadows and high skies. In common with many English landscape artists the skies are reminiscent of the work of John Constable (also a favourite of the French Barbizon School). The early works are inspired by the Romantic poetry of Shelley and Keats, sentiments from an earlier age and possess titles that include Midst Tall crested reeds whispering their lullaby (RSBA 1881) and Stretch’d Wide and Wild the Enormous Marsh (RSBA 1892). Gore’s rural landscapes often possess tranquillity and an abiding affection for the countryside.

== Children and animal paintings ==
Gore was a Victorian genre painter of children and animals. Genre painting is a term that refers to the depiction of everyday life and was immensely popular in the late Victorian period. Gore’s painting of children and animals capture the excitement and playfulness of a Victorian child at play. They are affectionate and arresting but came to be seen by some critics as trite and sentimental. Their reassessment took the best part of a century. The whereabouts of many of his genre paintings are unknown with some examples known only from photographs and sketches discovered at his studio in Newbury. One of W.H.Gore’s most famous images is Forgive Us Our Trespasses exhibited at the Royal Academy in 1897. A little girl in a night-dress is kneeling against her bed saying her prayers. A small dog, possibly one of the terriers that Gore owned, is also kneeling seeking attention. It is an image that has been produced many times since in commercial settings. The West Berkshire Museum at Newbury in Gore’s home town owns two paintings A Pastoral Scene (1914) and The Culprit (1900), the latter an example of Gore’s genre painting of children.

== Bibliography ==
- Margaret Wheeler (1992), William Henry Gore: A Victorian / Edwardian Painter 1857 – 1942, Independent publication, Bromsgrove, United Kingdom ISBN 0722326505
- Jeremy Maas, Victorian Painters (1988), Random House Value Pub; Reissue edition ISBN 051767131X ISBN 9780517671313
- Adrain Vincent, Victorian Watercolours: Rural Life, Michael Joseph; 1st edition (12 Oct. 1987) ISBN 0718128737 ISBN 9780718128739
- Elizabeth Prettejohn (1999), After the Pre-Raphaelites: Art and Aestheticism in Victorian England. Manchester: Manchester University Press. ISBN 9780719054068

== Gallery ==
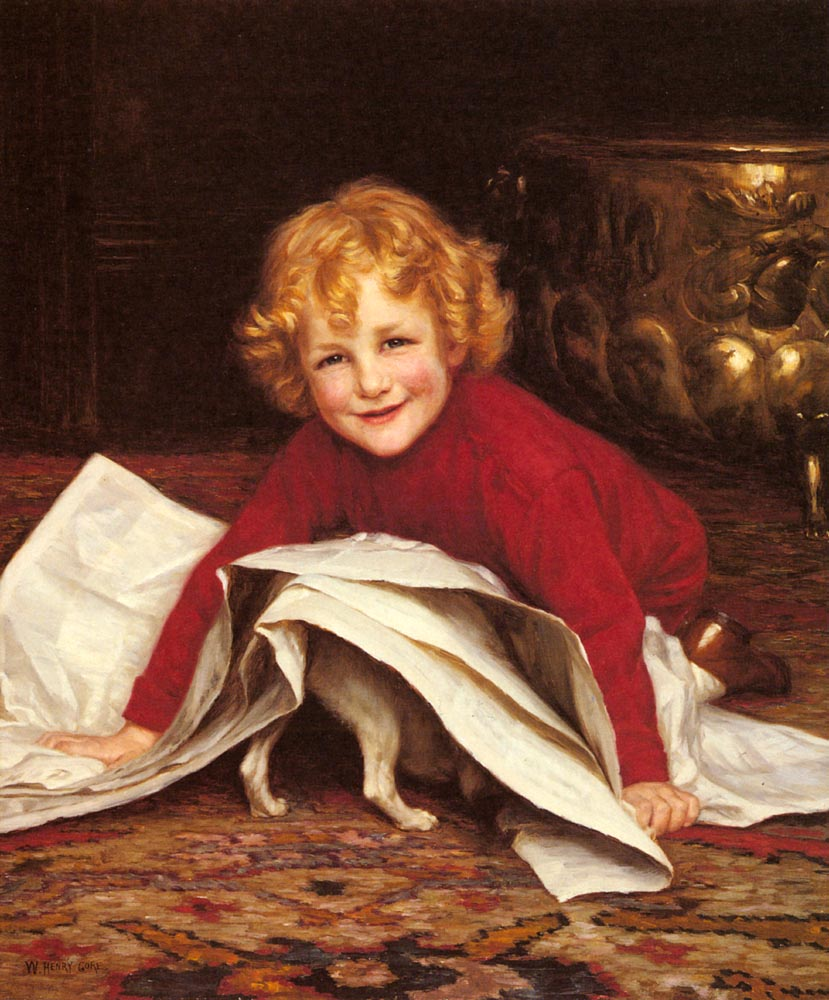

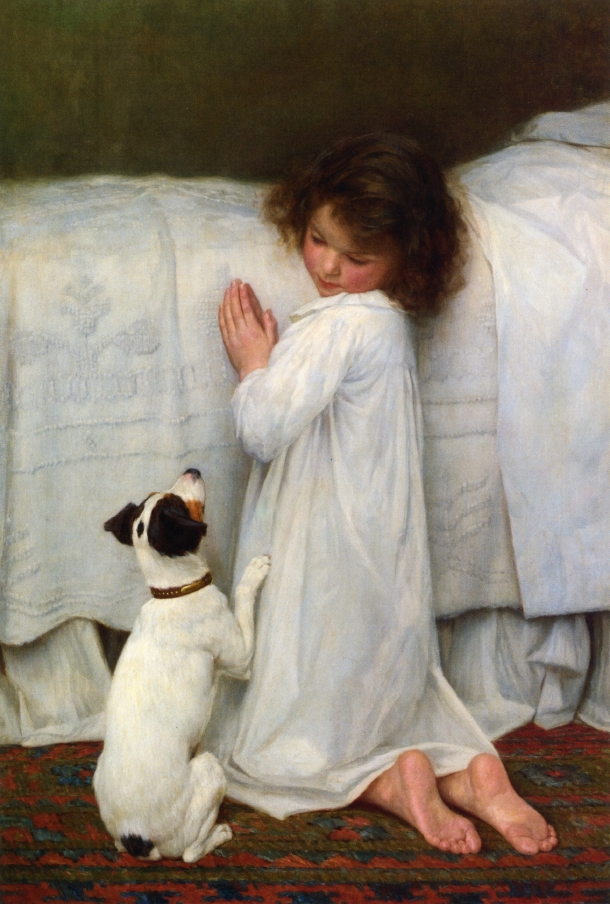

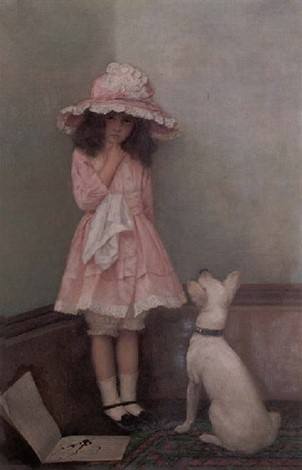

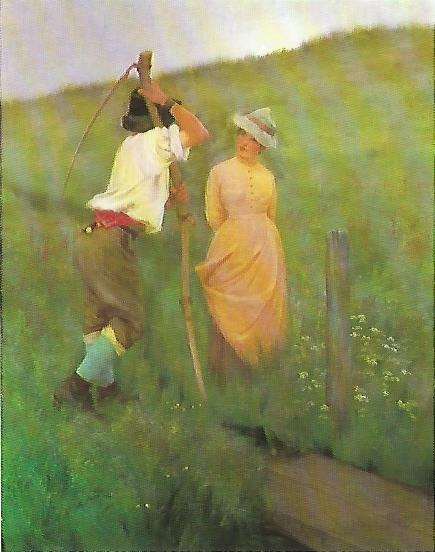
