= Amberley Wild Brooks =

Nature reserve in West Sussex, England

Coordinates: 50.918°N 0.532°W

- Site of Special Scientific Interest
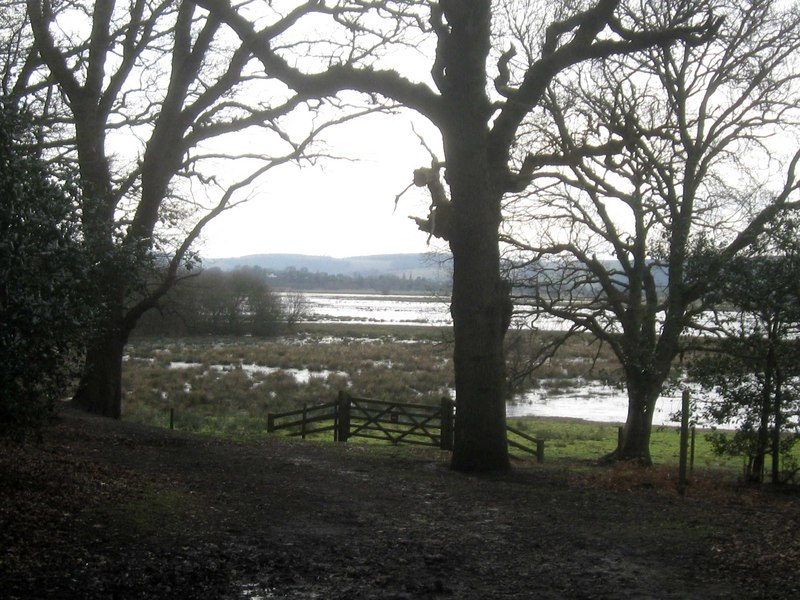
- Location of Amberley Wild Brooks.
- Area of search: West Sussex
- Grid reference: TQ 033 142
- Interest: Biological
- Area: 327.5 hectares (809 acres)
- Notification date: 1685
- Location map: Magic Map

Amberley Wild Brooks or Amberley Wildbrooks is a 327.5-hectare (809-acre) biological Site of Special Scientific Interest west of Storrington in West Sussex. An area of 80 hectares (200 acres) is a nature reserve managed by the Sussex Wildlife Trust It is a Site of Special Scientific Interest and a Nature Conservation Review site. It is also part of the Arun Valley Ramsar site, Special Area of Conservation and Special Protection Area.

This area of grazing marsh, which is dissected by drainage ditches, has a number of uncommon invertebrates, particularly dragonflies, and 156 species of flowering plants have been recorded. It is also important for wintering birds, with nationally significant numbers of teal, shoveler and Bewick’s swan. There are two rare snails, Anisus vorticulus and Pseudamnicola confusa.
