= RAF Eastchurch =

Former Royal Air Force station in Kent, England

RAF Eastchurch
- Near Eastchurch, Kent in England

Site information
- Type: Royal Air Force station
- Code: EA
- Owner: Air Ministry
- Operator: Royal Navy (1910–1918); Royal Air Force (1918–1946)
- Controlled by: RAF Coastal Command 1938-41 * No. 16 Group RAF; RAF Technical Training Command 1941-42; RAF Fighter Command 1942, 1943 * No. 11 Group RAF; RAF Army Cooperation Command 1942-43 * No. 72 Group RAF; RAF Flying Training Command 1943-46 * No. 54 Group RAF

Location
- Shown within Kent RAF Eastchurch (the United Kingdom)
- Coordinates: 51°23′40″N 000°50′48″E

Site history
- Built: 1911
- In use: 1911-1946
- Battles/wars: European theatre of World War II

Airfield information
- Elevation: 14 metres (46 ft) AMSL
Runways
Direction	Length and surface
00/00	Grass
00/00	Grass
00/00	Grass

Royal Air Force Eastchurch or more simply RAF Eastchurch (formerly RNAS Eastchurch) is a former Royal Air Force station near Eastchurch village, on the Isle of Sheppey, Kent, England. The history of aviation at Eastchurch stretches back to the first decade of the 20th century when it was used as an airfield by members of the Royal Aero Club. The area saw the first flight by a British pilot in Britain.

In 1910 it was operated by the Royal Navy as a training aerodrome and it was known as the Naval Flying School, Eastchurch. In the 1910s the airfield was designated Royal Naval Air Station Eastchurch. With the amalgamation of the Royal Naval Air Service and the Royal Flying Corps on 1 April 1918, the station was transferred to the newly formed Royal Air Force and was re-designated Royal Air Force Eastchurch.

== Early civilian aviation ==
The members of the Aero Club of Great Britain established their first flying ground near Leysdown on the Isle of Sheppey in 1909. One of the Club's members, Francis McClean, acquired Stonepits Farm, on the marshes across from Leysdown, converting the land into an airfield for members of the Aero Club. A club house was established nearby at the Mussell Manor (now known as Muswell Manor).

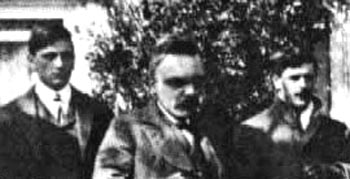
Left-to-right: Oswald (1883–1969), Horace (1872–1917) and Eustace Short (1875–1932) at Muswell Manor 1909

At the same time the Short Brothers established an aircraft factory at Shellbeach on Isle of Sheppey. This was the first aircraft factory in the British Isles and the first factory in the world for the series production of aircraft, these being license-built copies of the Wright A biplane.

It was here that John Moore-Brabazon (later Lord Brabazon of Tara) made a flight of 500 yards in his Voisin biplane The Bird of Passage, officially recognised as the first flight by a British pilot in Britain. Later in 1909, Moore-Brabazon piloted the first live cargo flight by fixed-wing aircraft. In order to disprove the adage that pigs can't fly he attached a waste-paper basket to a wing strut of his aircraft and airlifted one small pig inside the basket. Later Moore-Brabazon, Professor Huntington, Charles Rolls and Cecil Grace all used the flying club's services. In May 1909 the Wright Brothers visited Sheppey and inspected the airfield before moving on to visit the Short Brothers' factory. They then took lunch at Mussell Manor with members of the Aero Club and there was considerable discussion regarding the possibility of establishing a flying school in Sheppey.

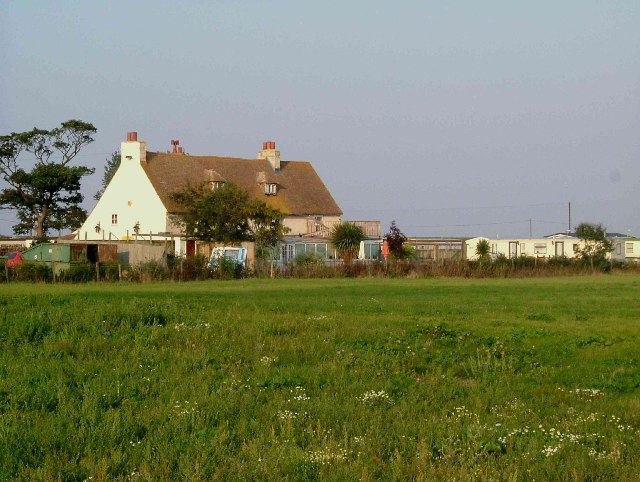
Mussell Manor – the birthplace and cradle of British aviation

In 1910 both the airfield and the aircraft factory were relocated to larger quarters at Eastchurch, about 2.5 miles (4 km) away, where the Short-Dunne 5, designed by John W. Dunne, was built and became the first tailless aircraft to fly. In 1911 Shorts built one of the first successful twin-engine aircraft, the S.39 or Triple Twin. At this time seaplanes had to be taken by barge to Queenborough on the Isle of Sheppey to be launched and tested.

== Royal Navy use ==
In November 1910 the Royal Aero Club, at the instigation of Francis McClean, offered the Royal Navy the use of its airfield at Eastchurch along with two aircraft and the services of its members as instructors in order that Naval officers might be trained as pilots. The Admiralty accepted and on 6 December the Commander-in-Chief at the Nore promulgated the scheme to the officers under his jurisdiction, stipulating that applicants be unmarried and able to pay the membership fees of the Royal Aero Club. Two hundred applications were received, and four were accepted: Lieutenants C.R. Samson, A.M. Longmore and A. Gregory, and Captain E L Gerrard, RMLI. It was originally planned that Cecil Grace would be their instructor but, following his untimely death, George Cockburn took his place, giving his services free of charge. Technical instruction was provided by Horace Short. The airfield later became the Naval Flying School, Eastchurch.

In 1913 Winston Churchill, then aged 38, and in the Cabinet as First Lord of the Admiralty, learned to fly here, despite warnings of the risk.

In 1914, it was under the command of Commander C.R. Samson (R.N.) and had 24 trained officers (as pilots) and 41 (trained) men.

In 1916 a siding was laid to connect the Royal Navy Aviation School with Eastchurch railway station on the Sheppey Light Railway.

== Royal Air Force use ==
Towards the end of the First World War, on 1 April 1918, the Royal Naval Air Service and the Royal Flying Corps amalgamated. The station at Eastchurch was transferred to the newly formed Royal Air Force and was re-designated Royal Air Force Station Eastchurch, or RAF Eastchurch for short. During the last few months of the War, No. 204 Training Depot Station, the 64th (Naval) Wing and the 58th (Training) Wing were based at Eastchurch.

RAF Eastchurch remained active during the inter-war years and it was home to No. 266 Squadron during the Battle of Britain. During the Second World War, Eastchurch was part of Coastal Command. RAF Eastchurch closed in 1946. The Memorial to the Home of Aviation was unveiled in near All Saints' Church in Eastchurch in 1955.

The following units were here at some point:

- No. 4 Squadron RAF
- No. 19 Squadron RAF
- No. 21 Squadron RAF
- No. 33 Squadron RAF
- No. 48 Squadron RAF
- No. 53 Squadron RAF
- No. 59 Squadron RAF
- No. 65 (East India) Squadron RAF
- No. 100 Squadron RAF
- No. 122 (Bombay) Squadron RAF
- No. 124 (Baroda) Squadron RAF
- No. 132 (City of Bombay) Squadron RAF
- No. 142 Squadron RAF
- No. 165 (Ceylon) Squadron RAF
- No. 174 (Mauritius) Squadron RAF
- No. 175 Squadron RAF
- No. 181 Squadron RAF
- No. 182 Squadron RAF
- No. 183 (Gold Coast) Squadron RAF
- No. 184 Squadron RAF
- No. 207 Squadron RAF
- No. 245 (Northern Rhodesian) Squadron RAF
- No. 247 (China-British) Squadron RAF
- No. 263 (Fellowship of the Bellows) Squadron RAF
- No. 266 (Rhodesia) Squadron RAF
- No. 291 Squadron RAF
- No. 401 Squadron RCAF
- No. 567 Squadron RAF

The following units were here at some point:

- No. 1 Observers' School RAF (July - December 1918) became No. 2 Marine Observers School RAF (December 1918 - June 1919)
- No. 2 Air Armament School RAF (July 1918 - September 1939)
- No. 25 (Armament Training) Group RAF (December 1937 - June 1939)
- No. 52 (Army Co-operation) Wing RAF (May - June 1940)
- 58th (Training) Wing RAF (April - December 1918)
- No. 122 Airfield Headquarters RAF (April - June 1943)
- No. 204 Training Depot Station (April 1918 - March 1919)
- 820 Naval Air Squadron
- 821 Naval Air Squadron
- No. 1493 (Fighter) Gunnery Flight RAF (April - July 1943) became No. 18 Armament Practice Camp RAF (December 1943 - August 1944)
- No. 2751 Squadron RAF Regiment
- No. 2796 Squadron RAF Regiment
- No. 2837 Squadron RAF Regiment
- No. 2882 Squadron RAF Regiment
- No. 2884 Squadron RAF Regiment
- No. 3207 Servicing Commando
- No. 3209 Servicing Commando
- No. 4094 Anti-Aircraft Flight RAF Regiment
- Air Crew Allocation Centre RAF
- Armament Group RAF (February 1934 - December 1937)
- School of Aerial Gunnery & Bombing RAF became Armament and Gunnery School RAF (April 1922 - January 1932) became Air Armament School RAF (January 1932 - November 1937) became No. 1 Air Armament School RAF (November 1937 - August 1938)
- School of Technical Training (Men) RAF (? - February 1920 & March - May 1920)

== Current use ==
The site is currently used as HM Prison Standford Hill. While there are a number of new buildings some of the original buildings survive including a number of pillboxes. The main roads in the prison reflect the aviation links; Rolls Avenue and Airfield View, Short's Prospect and Wright's Way. In the entrance to HMP Swaleside are two brass plaques; one records that the prison is built on what was the airstrip of RAF Eastchurch, and the other lists the owners of the airstrip from 1909 to the end of the RAF use.

== See also ==
- RNAS Kingsnorth – another Royal Navy Air Station providing flying training during the 1910s
