= Prison Officers' Association =

The Prison Officers' Association may refer to:

- POA (trade union), based in the UK, formerly known as the "Prison Officers' Association
- Prison Officers' Association (Ireland)
- Scottish Prison Officers' Association, now part of POA

== See also ==
- Corrections Association of New Zealand
- Western Australian Prison Officers' Union
