= Mike Rolfe =

British trade union leader (born 1978)

Personal details
- Born: Michael Rolfe; 1978 (age 47–48) Barnehurst, London, England
- Party: Trade Unionist and Socialist Coalition (until 2015); Labour (2015–2019); Conservative (from 2019)
- Occupation: Trade union official, prison officer
- Known for: National chair of the POA (2016–2017)

Michael Rolfe (born 1978) is a British former trade union official who served as national chair of the POA, the union representing prison officers and related grades of staff in the United Kingdom, until May 2017. He stood as a parliamentary candidate at the 2017 general election and later founded the Criminal Justice Workers Union.

== Career ==
Rolfe became a prison officer at HM Prison Elmley in 2004.

In May 2013 he set up a Facebook page called "Know The Danger" (KTD), at a time when the prison system was undergoing major restructuring. He became a prominent commentator on prison conditions during the latter part of 2016, appearing on BBC News at Ten and other news outlets, and speaking about disturbances at prisons including Bedford, Wormwood Scrubs and Swaleside.

He was 38 when he took over as national chair of the POA, making him one of the youngest trade union leaders in the United Kingdom. He stepped down from the position on 3 May 2017.

In April 2020, Rolfe founded the Criminal Justice Workers Union (CJWU), a union for prison staff.

== Political career ==
Rolfe stood in the 2013 Kent County Council election for the Trade Unionist and Socialist Coalition in the Sheppey division, finishing fifth.

He was selected as the Labour candidate for the Sittingbourne and Sheppey constituency at the 2017 general election, held on 8 June 2017. He finished second to the sitting Conservative MP Gordon Henderson, taking 15,700 votes.

In August 2019, Rolfe resigned as the constituency's prospective Labour candidate and left the party, saying he was at odds with the Labour leadership over Brexit and describing its messaging on the issue as disjointed. In November 2019 he joined the Conservative Party, saying that Henderson had raised issues on behalf of prison staff and had kept an open door to union representatives.
