= Hilary Stratton =

English artist known for sculpture (1906–1986)

Hilary Byfield Stratton
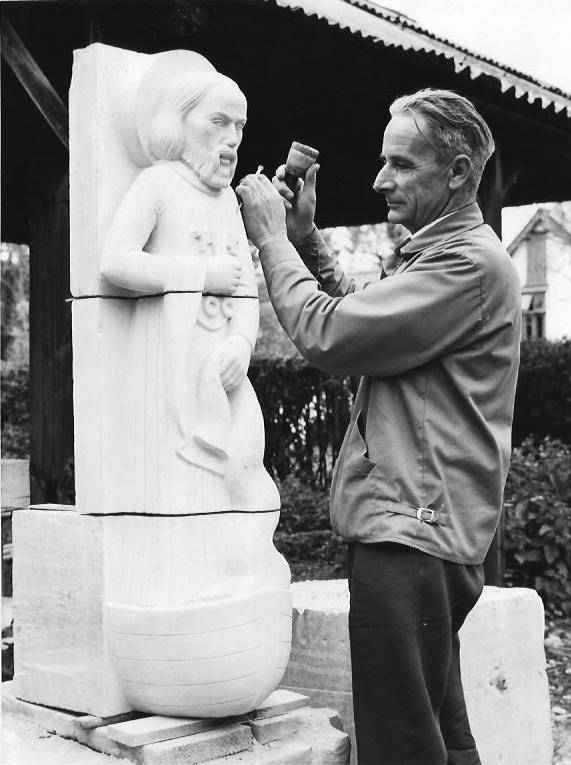
- Stratton at his workshop in Barns Green, Sussex.
- Born: 6 June 1906; Amberley, West Sussex, England
- Died: 20 May 1985 (aged 78); Barns Green, West Sussex, England
- Education: St. Martin’s School of Art, Royal College of Art, Westminster Art School
- Known for: Sculpture, stone carving, electrophoretic painting,
- Notable work: Memorial to the Home of Aviation, Invicta monument
- Movement: Bronze Sculpture, stone carving, jewellery
- Awards: FRBS

Hilary Byfield Stratton FRBS (29 June 1906 – 20 May 1985) was an English sculptor, stonemason and teacher working in the 20th Century. He is best known for his stone carvings and memorials but experimented in other media that included: perspex, copper and resin. Stratton was an adherent of Eric Gill, with whom he was apprenticed at the age of thirteen, and the influence of the Arts and Crafts movement was evident in much of Stratton's work.

== Early life ==
Stratton was born in Amberley in West Sussex, the son of Frederick Stratton (1870-1960), a commercial painter and watercolorist and Lucy Stratton. Amberley and the neighbouring hamlet of North Stoke were the centre of an artistic community that included Edward Stott who settled in Amberley in the late 1880s, Arthur Rackham and John Ireland. His father who in the 1920s had a studio in Chelsea was a major influence on the young Stratton, encouraging him to practice with different materials and when Stratton Jr was just twelve he carved a Portland stone figure of an ancient Egyptian supporting a bowl under his knees.

At the age of thirteen Stratton was apprenticed to Eric Gill, a friend of his father in Ditchling, cycling the twenty five miles from home on a Monday and returning on a Friday. It was with Gill that Stratton learnt the technical skills required of a stone mason. His bas-relief carving appears on the War Memorial at South Harting unveiled in 1920 and attributed to Gill. On completion of his apprenticeship Stratton studied sculpture at St. Martin's School of Art leaving at seventeen years to attend the Royal College of Art, where he studied under Gilbert Ledward and Henry Moore.

In July 1937 Stratton married Eileen Letitia Despard (1910–1997) known as Billie, the niece of the suffragette and Sinn Féin campaigner Charlotte Despard. They met whilst Despard was posing as an artist's model.

== Career as a sculptor and teacher ==
In 1931 he began establishing himself as a teacher and to the outbreak of the Second World War he taught stone carving and lettering at Westminster School of Art. After the War during which Stratton served as a fireman in the London Blitz and in India as part of the Intelligence Corp, he returned to teaching in his native Sussex at the Horsham School of Art and at the West Sussex College of Art & Design in Worthing.

Stratton always maintained a strong attachment to rural Sussex and he opened a studio next to his house at White Turret Cottage in Barns Green from where he worked for the next thirty years until his death in 1985. He ran a commercial practice as a stone mason specialising in public memorials that were carved mostly from Portland Stone. He also had an electrophoretic plating plant installed for working with other materials including: copper, brass, silver and gold. It allowed him to avoid the cost of cast metal processes and was a service offered to other sculptors and artists. His skills as a craftsman allowed Stratton to become a versatile artist adept at working on a monumental scale to producing delicate ornaments in a variety of media and even precise contemporary pieces of jewellery.

Stratton's sculptures often display an appreciation of medieval church statuary as was befitting of a pupil of Eric Gill and many of Stratton's public works can be found on churches and ecclesiastical buildings across the south of England. An example of this period of his work is the sculpture he was commissioned to provide for St Peter's Church of England School in Henfield, West Sussex. Two prime examples of his larger works are the Memorial to the Home of Aviation at Eastchurch, Isle of Sheppey in Kent and the Invicta Monument now located in the church yard of Saint Peter and Saint Paul's Church in Swanscombe, Kent, but previously next to the main A2 road to Dover.

Stratton died at his home in Barns Green on 20 May 1985. He is buried at the local Parish Church of St. Nicolas in Itchingfield, West Sussex.

== Selected works ==
- 1920: South Harting War Memorial situated at St Mary and St Gabriel Parish Church: the bas relief of St Patrick at the base of the monument is by Stratton
- 1955: Isle of Sheppey, Memorial to the Home of Aviation, design by Sidney Loweth, sculpted by Stratton
- 1957: City of Westminster, St Clement Danes church, floor memorial to Royal Air Force
- 1958: Swanscombe, Invicta Monument erected to the Men of Kent at St.Peter & St Paul
- 1960: Stanmore, Middlesex, St William of York R C Church, 3.5 m tall sculpture of the Crucifixion
- 1963: Henfield, Sussex, St Peter's COE Primary School, sculpture of St Peter
- 1969: Wivelsfield, East Sussex, memorial to Jessie Edey (1885–1969), a nanny to the children of the local Herbison family

== Illustrations of works ==
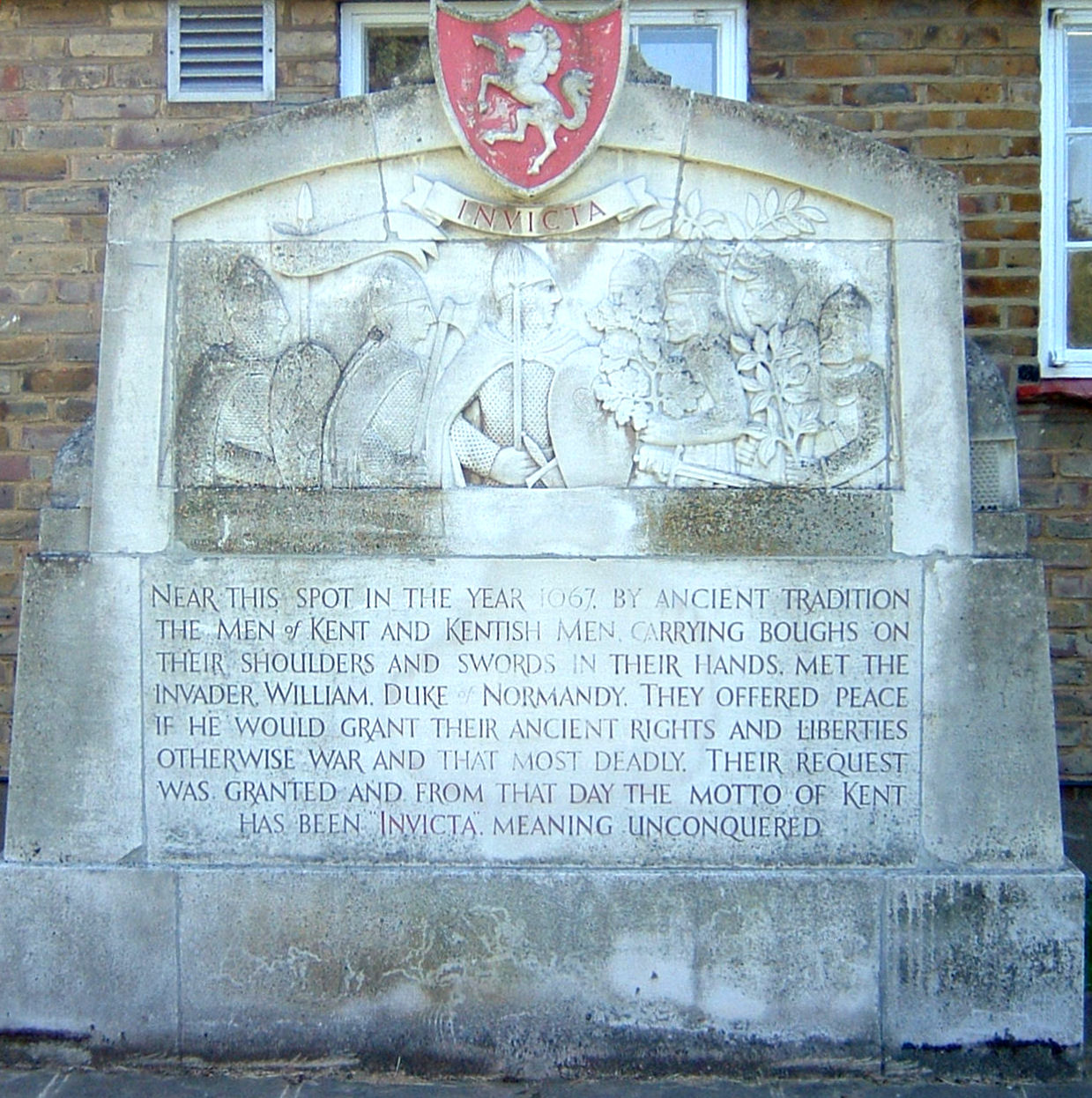
Invicta Monument, Swanscombe

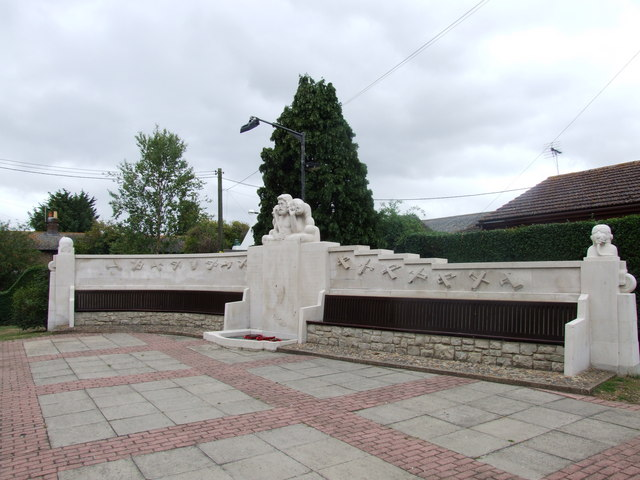
Memorial to the Home of Aviation, Eastchurch

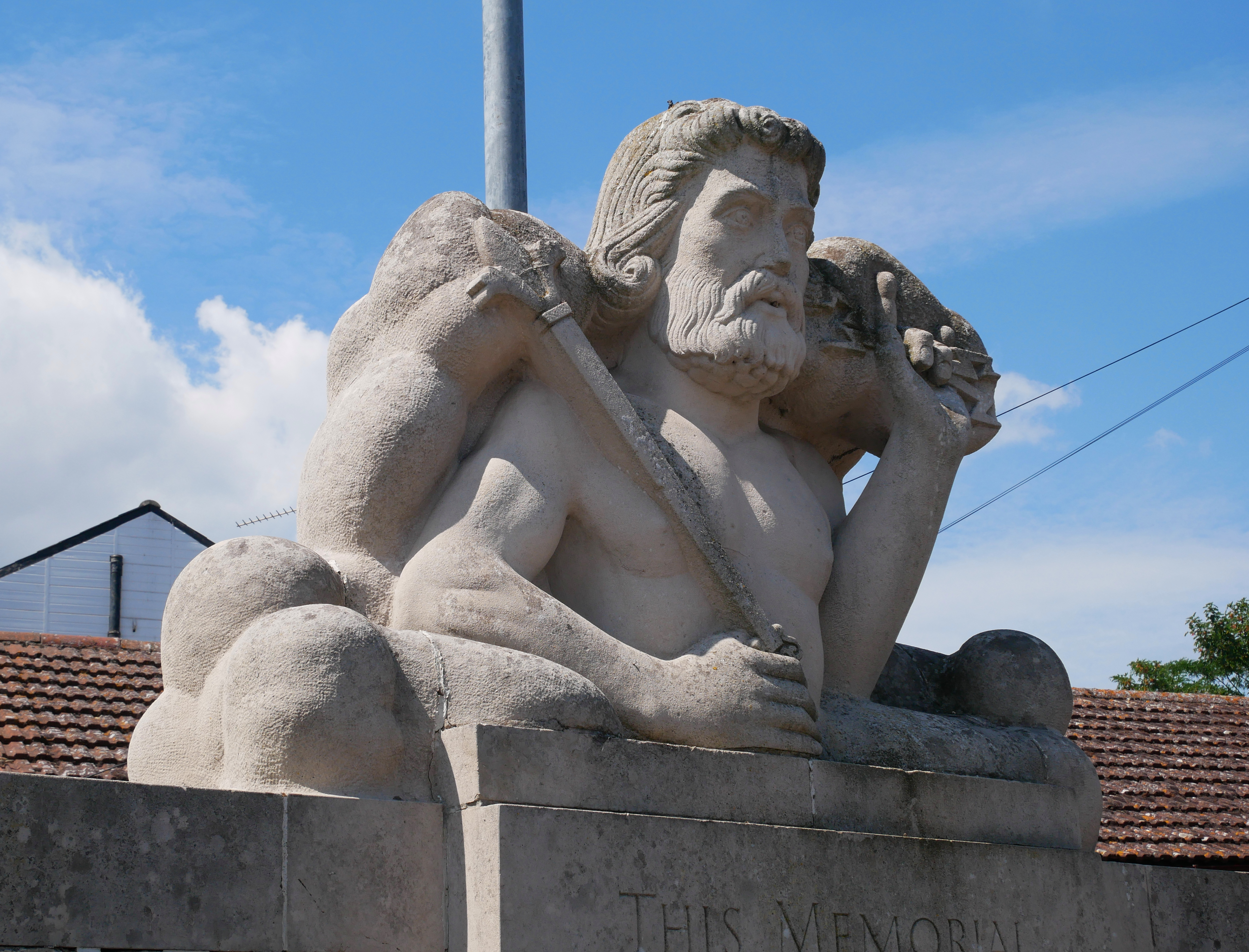
Memorial to the Home of Aviation: detail

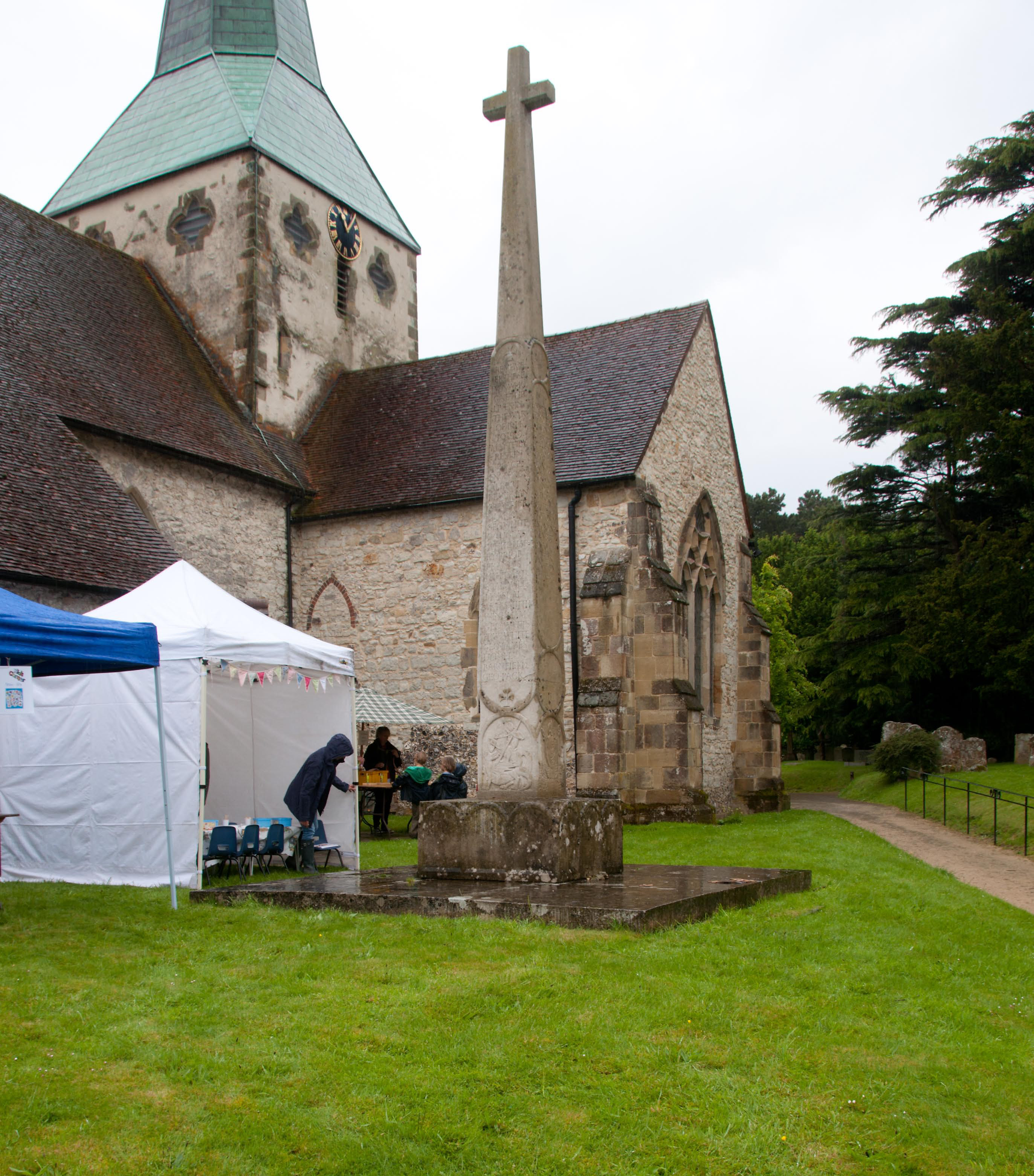
South Harting War Memorial

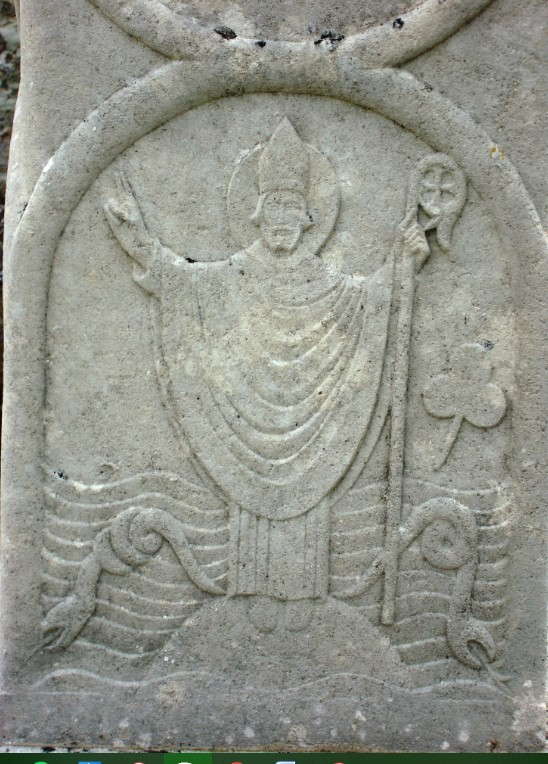
South Harting War Memorial: bas-relief by Stratton
