= HM Prison Swaleside =

Prison in Kent

HMP Swaleside
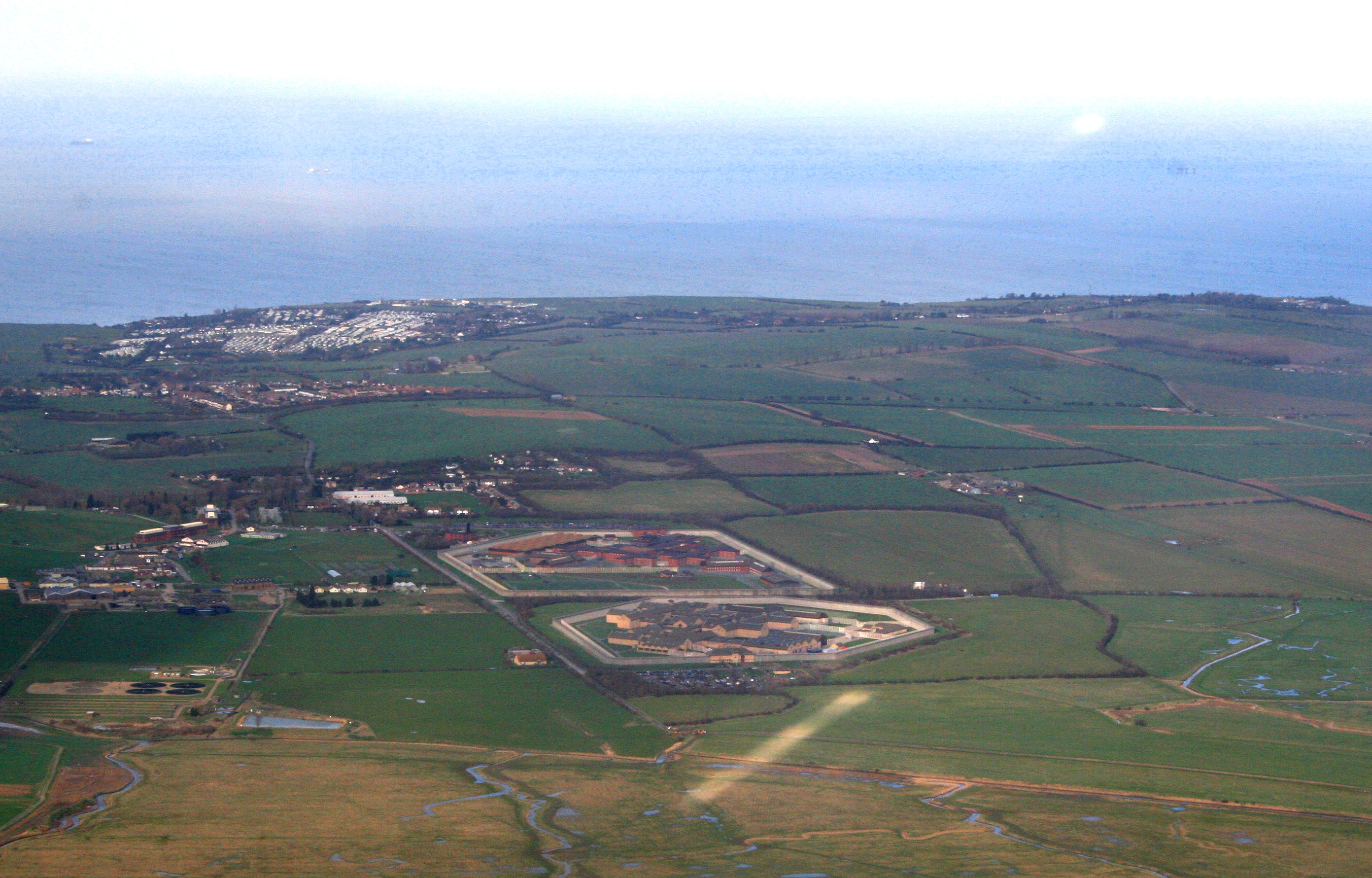
- Prisons, Sheppey Cluster, Isle of Sheppey

- Location in Kent
- Location: Eastchurch, Kent; 51.3919°N 0.8526°E
- Security class: Adult Male/Category B
- Capacity: 1,112
- Population: 1,100 (August 2022)
- Opened: 1988
- Managed by: HM Prison Services
- Governor: Abby Gardner
- Website: Swaleside at justice.gov.uk

HM Prison Swaleside is a Category B men's prison, located close to the village of Eastchurch on the Isle of Sheppey, Kent. Swaleside forms part of the Sheppey prison cluster, which also includes HMP Elmley and HMP Standford Hill. The prison is operated by His Majesty's Prison Service.

== History ==
Swaleside opened in 1988 with four residential wings (A-D), each holding 126 prisoners. E wing, a purpose-built drug treatment unit opened in 1998, with a holding capacity of 120 prisoners. In 1999 F wing opened, also designed to hold 120 prisoners. A further two wings were added, G wing in 2009 and H wing in 2010, each with a 179 holding capacity. The prison also has a 25-bed segregation unit and a 17-bed inpatient health care unit.

In August 2002, an investigation was launched into a major disturbance at Swaleside Prison. The aggression of an inmate locked in his cell was the catalyst, with some prisoners in the same wing refusing to return to their cells and demanding money and a helicopter.

In April 2006, a prison officer from Swaleside was jailed for two years, after he tried to smuggle cannabis into the prison. The officer (who is the son of a prison governor) had been discovered as he reported for his shift during a routine search.

Two months later, an inspection report from Her Majesty's Chief Inspector of Prisons praised Swaleside Prison for its "greatly improved living conditions and atmosphere." The report also stated that relations between staff and prisoners were good and security was well-managed. However the prison was told to increase employment places and training programmes for prisoners, as well as improve anti-bullying and race relations strategies.

A further inspection report in September 2008, again praised Swaleside for being a safe prison with good staff-prisoner relations. The report also highlighted improvements in the prisons anti-bullying, suicide and self-harm prevention arrangements. However the report again criticised the amount of time prisoners spent in their cells, with a lack of work and training places available at the jail. The report also called for further improvements in race relations at Swaleside.

In October 2014, The Prison Officers Association said a major incident had happened at the jail and a prison officer had been stabbed during a riot, Mike Rolfe told the BBC a prison officer had been injured and he said a disturbance began at the jail during the afternoon and was still ongoing. The officer was taken to hospital to treat facial injuries but had since been discharged.

In March 2015, a prisoner was murdered by two fellow inmates. A Kent Police spokesman said: "The Kent and Essex Serious Crime Directorate has launched a murder investigation after a man was pronounced dead in HMP Swaleside at around 7pm on Wednesday 25 March. Two men, aged 32 and 44, have been arrested on suspicion of murder and remain in police custody."

== The prison today ==
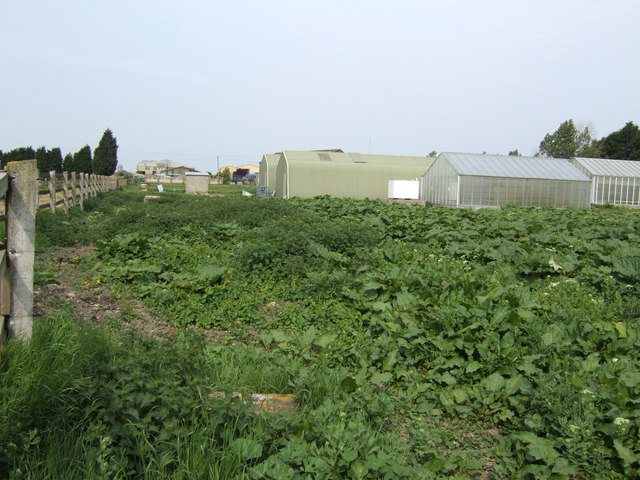
Horticultural unit at HMP Swaleside

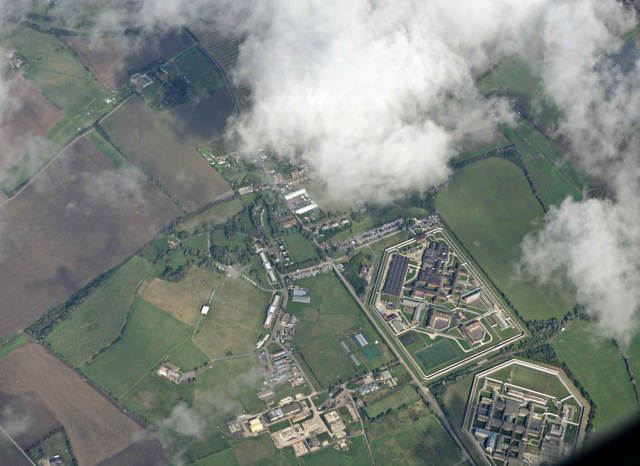
Sheppey Prisons Cluster in 2015

Swaleside is a Category B prison for adult males, more than half of them serving life sentences. It is a main centre prison for prisoners in the first stage of a life sentence. The prison has a high minority ethnic population of between 30 and 40%, and a similar number of foreign national prisoners.

Education at the prison is provided by Canterbury College, with courses ranging from basic education to Open University level. Employment activities for inmates include industrial cleaning, engineering, commercially run industries workshops, horticultural and agricultural activities.

A high proportion of prisoners surveyed said they had felt unsafe at Swaleside. Many also said getting alcohol and drugs was easy there. A 2016 HM Inspectorate of Prisons report stated the prison was dangerous with far too much violence. Mike Rolfe of the Prison Officers Association said:

What you have is a really unhelpful mix around the prison estate of prisoner-staff relationships now, where staff numbers have been cut so that staff don't feel confident or empowered to be able to do their role. That's led to a breakdown of the relationship.

Rolfe added a good relationship was needed where prison officers could encourage prisoners to work or study and help prisoners turn their lives round. Rolfe has also described Swaleside as "a particularly difficult place to work" because of an "acute staff shortfall" and high levels of violence. Former Swaleside governor, John Podmore, said prisons were "undoubtedly dangerous" and added:

We should be sending fewer people to jail in absolute terms but we need to be looking at who we are locking up, why we are locking them up and how we deal with the way in which they are offending against society. We need a much more subtle approach than what we have at the moment,

There was a riot at Swaleside in December 2016 when prisoners took over a wing for a time. Reportedly at least nine prisoners from Birmingham Prison were transferred to Swaleside. There were also riots at Bedford Prison, Lewes Prison and Birmingham Prison.

== Notable former inmates ==
- Michael Bettaney
- Kenneth Noye
