= Memorial to the Home of Aviation =

Memorial in Eastchurch, Kent, England

Coordinates: 51°24′24″N 0°51′27″E

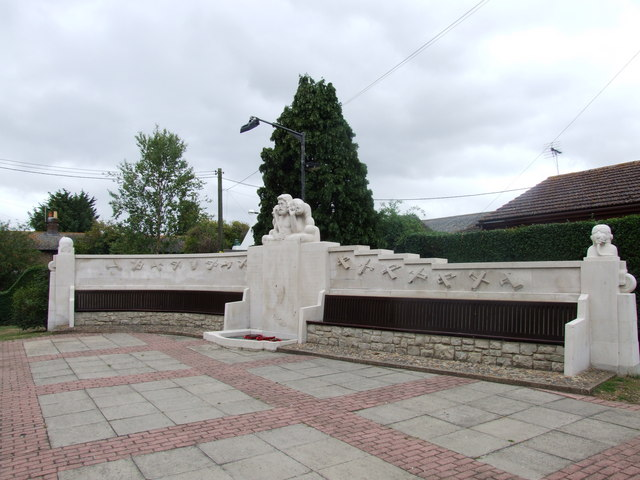

The Memorial to the Home of Aviation is a stone memorial sculpture at Eastchurch, on the Isle of Sheppey in the English county of Kent. The Grade II* listed memorial, unveiled in 1955, commemorates the early aviation flights from Leysdown and Eastchurch by members of the club that became the Royal Aero Club of Great Britain in 1910, and the air base established by the Royal Navy near Eastchurch in 1911.

== Background ==
The Aero Club established a flying ground at Leysdown in 1909, with its clubhouse at Mussel Manor, near sheds where the Short Brothers assembled licensed versions of the Wright Flyer. The Short Brothers factory moved to a better site at Standford Hill, south of Eastchurch, in 1910, where its Grade II listed sheds survive. The Aero Club moved to Stonepitts Farm near Eastchurch, and the Admiralty established a Royal Navy flying school at the Eastchurch flying ground in 1911, which became the headquarters of the Naval Wing of the newly-established Royal Flying Corps in 1912, and then the location of a Royal Naval Air Service station in 1914, and later RAF Eastchurch. The Stonepitts site is now used as an open prison, HM Prison Standford Hill.

There were moves to commemorate the historic importance of the site in the late 1940s and 1950s. A public meeting in late 1949 called for a museum or library in an extension to the Eastchurch village hall, and a letter was published by The Times on 11 February 1950, signed by Winston Churchill, Lord Brabazon of Tara, and Hugh Oswald Short, appealing for public support.

The memorial was erected on the west side of Church Road in Eastchurch, at its junction with High Street, opposite the Grade I listed All Saints Church. One of the roads leads towards Leysdown and the other towards Eastchurch Aerodrome. It was unveiled on 25 July 1955 by Lord Tedder, former Chief of the Air Staff. It was rededicated fifty years later, in 2005. It was listed at Grade II in 1978, and upgraded to Grade II* in 2018 at the 100th anniversary of the founding of the Royal Air Force.

== Description ==
The memorial was designed by the Kent county architect Sidney Loweth and comprises a curtain wall facing to the east faced with Portland stone, bearing allegorical sculptures and a frieze of early aircraft, sculpted by Hilary Stratton. It was constructed by G.E. Wallis and Sons of Maidstone (who in earlier years had constructed the Queen's Own Royal West Kent Regiment Cenotaph in Maidstone, and the Royal Berkshire Regiment War Memorial in Reading). The upper white Portland stone panels of the memorial are support by lower walls of Kentish ragstone with integral wooden seating, and the area below is paved with flint cobbles. Beneath the central plinth is an area covered with blue glass setts.

The memorial has a central plinth with a bust of Zeus, flanked by walls to either side bearing relief scriptures of aircraft from 1909 to 1911, each wall ending with a stone pier. From above, the walls resemble the curved camber of an aeroplane wing. The wall to the south is curved, and maintains the same height out to the pier, which is topped by globe. Carved stone panels on the south wall depict an Avro Triplane, Cody 1, De Havilland Biplane No. 1, Howard Wright 1909 Biplane, Dunne D.5, Bristol Monoplane, Handley Page Type E, and a Sopwith-Wright biplane. The central plinth is carved to depict a Short Flying Boat which seems to be landing on the blue glass setts below. The wall to the north is straight but steps down to a pier topped by a bust of an aviator. The wall bears stone panels depicting a Short biplane, a Short Type 184 seaplane, Short Twin, Short S.38, Short S.27, the Short Biplane No.2, and Short Biplane No.1.

An inscription on the central plinth reads: "THIS MEMORIAL / COMMEMORATES / THE FIRST HOME OF / BRITISH AVIATION / 1909 / NEAR THIS SPOT AT / LEYSDOWN EASTCHURCH / (MUSSEL MANOR) (STONEPITTS FARM) / FLIGHTS AND EXPERIMENTS WERE / MADE BY MEMBERS OF THE AERO / CLUB (LATER ROYAL) OF GREAT BRITAIN / ALSO THE ESTABLISHMENT OF THE / FIRST AIRCRAFT FACTORY IN GREAT / BRITAIN BY SHORT BROTHERS 1909 / AND THE FORMATION OF THE FIRST / ROYAL NAVAL AIR SERVICE STATION / 1911".

Other inscriptions identify the aircraft depicted, list names of early aviators (including John Moore-Brabazon, Charles Rolls, Frank McClean (who granted a lease of the Eastchurch site to the Aero Club), A. K. Huntington, J. W. Dunne, Maurice Egerton, T. O. M. Sopwith, Cecil Grace, Alec Ogilvie, Percy Grace, Ernest Pitman, G. P. L. Jezzi, and James Travers) and early aircraft designers and engineers (including Horace Short, Eustace Short, Oswald Short, and the first four pilots of the Royal Naval Air Service: Charles Rumney Samson, Arthur Longmore, and Reginald Gregory RN, and Eugene Gerrard RMLI.

== See also ==
- Grade II* listed war memorials in England
- Grade II* listed buildings in Kent

== Sources ==
- Historic England. "Memorial to 'The Home of Aviation' (Grade II*) (1258069)". National Heritage List for England.
- "Pioneers of British Aviation". War Memorials Online.
- "Home of Aviation and Royal Naval Air Service". War Memorials Register. Imperial War Museums.
- Aircraft monument, Eastchurch, geograph.org.uk
- Eastchurch Memorial to Pioneer Airman [unveiling booklet], 25 July 1955, archived from the original on 21 May 2018
- King, Norman (Winter 2008). "The first home of British aviation" (PDF). Maidstone Model Engineering Society Newsletter: 2.
