= Steve Gillan =

British trade union leader

Stephen Paul Gillan (born June 1964) is a British trade union leader.

Born in Greenock in Scotland, Gillan moved with his family to Australia at an early age, then to Basildon in England. He left school in 1979 and worked in banking, retail and then for the Ford Motor Company. In 1989, he became a prison officer at HMP Chelmsford, and became active in the POA trade union. In 1997, he was promoted to senior officer at HMP Bullwood Hall. He transferred to HMP Pentonville in 2001, where he temporarily served as principal officer.

In 2002, Gillan was elected as national vice chair of the POA, serving until 2006 when he became national finance officer. He was elected as general secretary of the union in 2010, and was subsequently elected to the General Council of the Trades Union Congress, and as chair of the Trades Union Councils' Joint Consultative Committee. In 2025, he was elected as President of the Trades Union Congress.

Trade union offices
Preceded by Brian Caton	General Secretary of the POA; 2010–present	Succeeded by Incumbent
Preceded by Matt Wrack	Chair of the Trades Union Councils' Joint Consultative Committee; 2020–present	Succeeded by Incumbent
Preceded by Mark Dickinson	President of the Trades Union Congress; 2025–2026	Succeeded by Simon Weller
