= Sittingbourne and Sheppey =

UK Parliament constituency (since 1997)

Coordinates: 51.38°N 0.74°E

- County constituency for the House of Commons
- Boundaries since 2024
- Boundary of Sittingbourne and Sheppey in South East England
- County: Kent
- Electorate: 76,818 (2023)
- Major settlements: Sheerness, Minster, Sittingbourne, Kemsley

Current constituency
- Created: 1997
- Member of Parliament: Kevin McKenna (Labour)
- Seats: One
- Created from: Faversham

Sittingbourne and Sheppey is a constituency (Note: A county constituency (for the purposes of election expenses and type of returning officer)) in Kent represented in the House of Commons of the UK Parliament since the 2024 general election by Kevin McKenna, of the Labour Party. (Note: As with all constituencies, the constituency elects one Member of Parliament (MP) by the first past the post system of election at least every five years.)

== Constituency profile ==
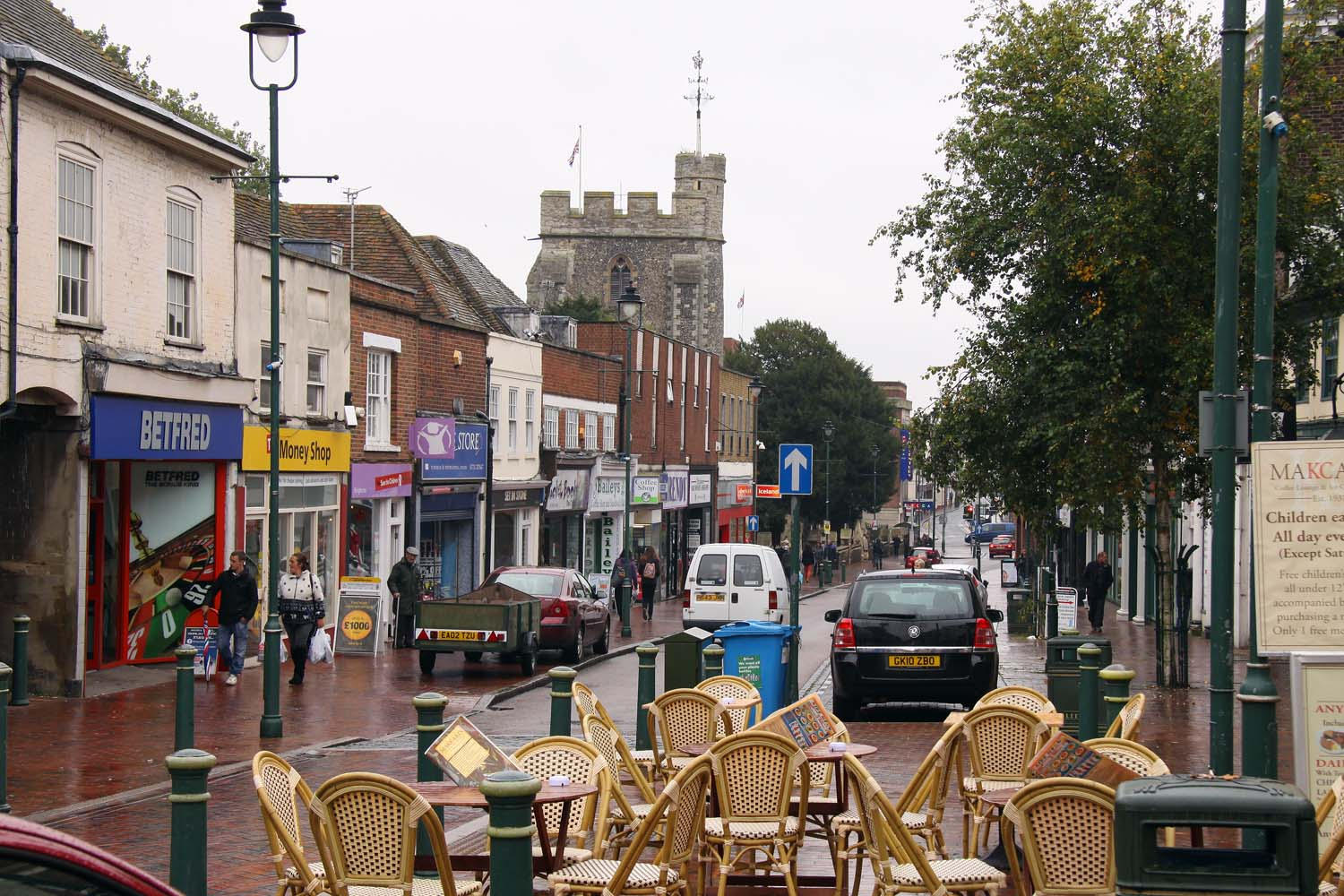
High Street, Sittingbourne

Sittingbourne and Sheppey is a constituency in Kent in South East England, within the Borough of Swale. It covers the town of Sittingbourne, which has a population of around 57,000, its nearby villages of Iwade and Newington, and the Isle of Sheppey which includes the towns of Sheerness, Minster and Queenborough and the villages of Halfway Houses and Eastchurch.

Sittingbourne is an industrial town which grew rapidly during the late 19th century as a centre for brickmaking, barge-building and paper manufacturing. Much of this industry has declined and today the town has high levels of deprivation, although there are some affluent suburbs in the south and the surrounding villages are generally wealthy. The Isle of Sheppey is a popular tourist destination with numerous caravan parks and holiday homes. Like many English coastal towns, this area has suffered from the decline in domestic tourism and is also highly-deprived, especially in the commercial port town of Sheerness. House prices across the constituency are generally lower than the UK average and considerably lower than the rest of South East England.

Residents of Sittingbourne and Sheppey have a similar age profile to the rest of the country. They have average levels of income, homeownership and child poverty. Residents generally have low levels of education and a high proportion work in the retail, manufacturing and transport sectors. The percentage claiming unemployment benefits is in line with the UK-wide rate. White people made up 93% of the population at the 2021 census.

At the local district council, the towns of Sittingbourne and Sheerness are mostly represented by the Labour Party, the rest of the Isle of Sheppey by Conservatives and the mainland villages by localists. At the county council, which held elections more recently (in 2025), all seats in this constituency were won by Reform UK. Voters in Sittingbourne and Sheppey strongly supported leaving the European Union in the 2016 referendum; an estimated 66% voted in favour of Brexit compared to the UK-wide figure of 52%.

== Boundaries ==
Map of 2010–2024 boundaries

1997–2010: The Borough of Swale wards of Borden, Eastern, Grove, Hartlip and Upchurch, Iwade and Lower Halstow, Kemsley, Milton Regis, Minster Cliffs, Murston, Newington, Queenborough and Halfway, Roman, Sheerness East, Sheerness West, Sheppey Central, West Downs, Woodstock.

2010–2015: The Borough of Swale wards of Borden, Chalkwell, Grove, Hartlip, Newington and Upchurch, Iwade and Lower Halstow, Kemsley, Leysdown and Warden, Milton Regis, Minster Cliffs, Murston, Queenborough and Halfway, Roman, St Michael's, Sheerness East, Sheerness West, Sheppey Central, Teynham and Lynsted, West Downs, Woodstock.

2015–2024: The Borough of Swale wards of Bobbing, Iwade and Lower Halstow; Borden and Grove Park; Chalkwell; Hartlip, Newington and Upchurch; Homewood; Kemsley; Milton Regis; Minster Cliffs; Murston; Queenborough and Halfway; Roman; Sheerness; Sheppey Central; Sheppey East; Teynham and Lynsted; The Meads; West Downs; and Woodstock.

2024–present: Further to the 2023 Periodic Review of Westminster constituencies which came into effect for the 2024 general election, the composition of the constituency is as follows (as they existed on 1 December 2020):

- The Borough of Swale wards of Bobbing, Iwade and Lower Halstow; Borden and Grove Park; Chalkwell; Hartlip, Newington and Upchurch; Homewood; Kemsley; Milton Regis; Minster Cliffs; Murston; Queenborough and Halfway; Roman; Sheerness; Sheppey Central; Sheppey East; The Meads; and Woodstock.

Reduced in size to bring its electorate within the permitted range by transferring the wards of Teynham and Lynstead, and West Downs to Faversham and Mid Kent.

The constituency was created in 1997, mostly from the former seat of Faversham. It covers some of the district of Swale, including Sittingbourne and the Isle of Sheppey.

== History ==
The constituency was created in 1997 as the successor to the former Faversham constituency, containing around 75% of the electors of the former seat. The removal of the town of Faversham itself (to the new seat of Faversham and Mid Kent) led to the name change, but Sittingbourne had already been the largest town in the former constituency.

Sittingbourne and Sheppey has been a bellwether of the national result since its creation in 1997, and taken together with its predecessor seat of Faversham, the bellwether streak stretches back to 1979. The seat came extremely close to losing this status in the 2005 general election, when Labour held the seat by just 79 votes after a recount, even though the sitting MP, Derek Wyatt, was expecting to lose.

Boundary changes which came into effect for the 2010 general election suggest that the Conservatives would have won the seat in 2005 on the new boundaries, though the estimated notional Conservative majority was extremely small, so that it could have gone either way.

Maintaining its bellwether status, the seat was held by Conservative Gordon Henderson at the 2010, 2015, 2017 and 2019 elections with very strong majorities, then taken by Labour's Kevin McKenna in 2024. However, McKenna has a majority of only 0.9% having received under 30% of the vote. This was aided by a collapse in the Conservative vote, most of which went to Reform UK, making the seat a 3-way marginal for the next election.

== Members of Parliament ==
Faversham prior to 1997

Election	Member	Party
1997	Derek Wyatt	Labour
2010	Gordon Henderson	Conservative
2024	Kevin McKenna	Labour

== Elections ==
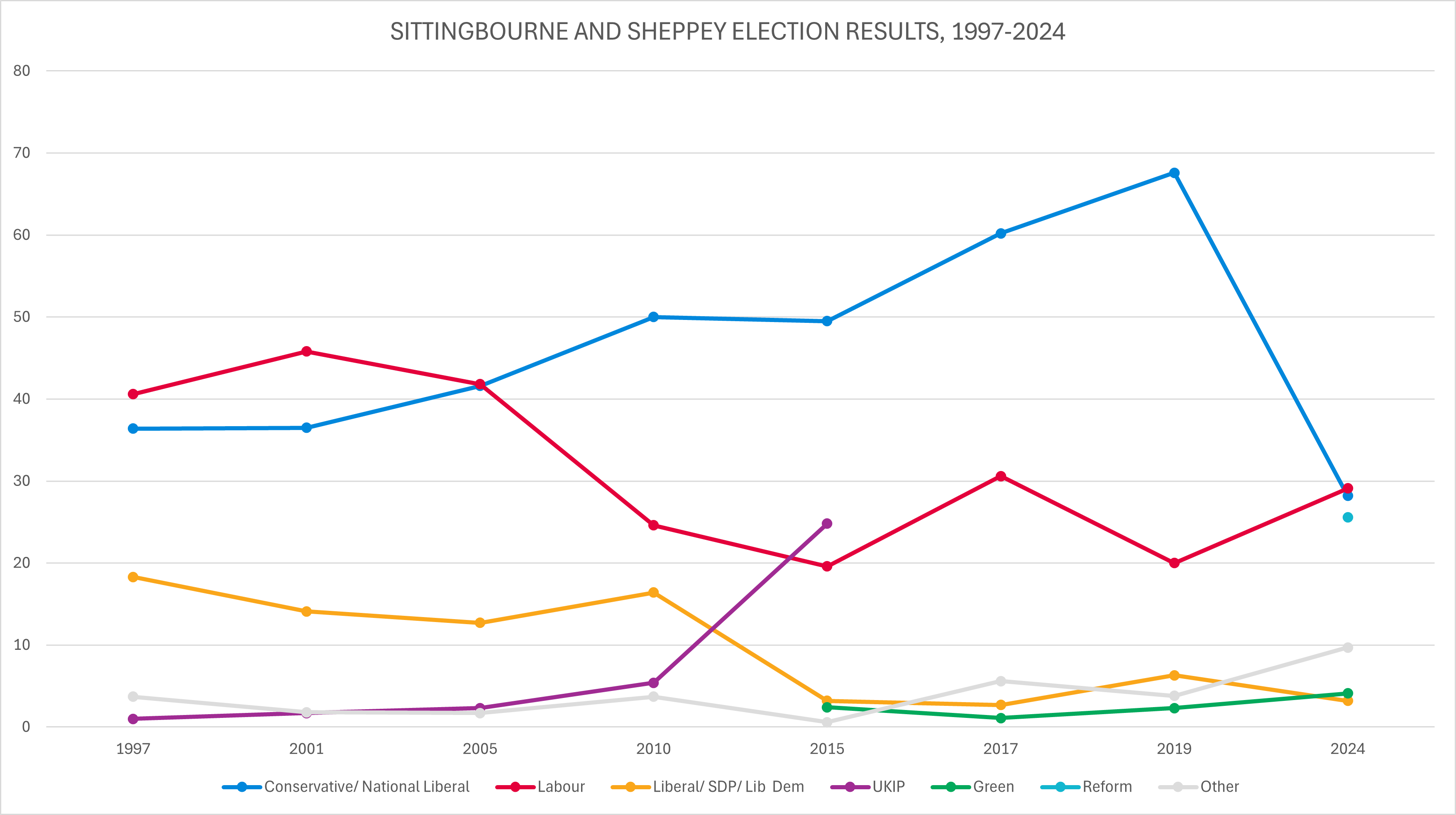
Election results 1950–2024

=== Elections in the 2020s ===
General election 2024: Sittingbourne and Sheppey
Party	Candidate	Votes	%	±%
Labour	Kevin McKenna	11,919	29.1	+8.2
Conservative	Aisha Cuthbert	11,564	28.2	−38.3
Reform	William Fotheringham-Bray	10,512	25.6	N/A
Swale Ind.	Mike Baldock	3,238	7.9	N/A
Green	Sam Banks	1,692	4.1	+1.9
Liberal Democrats	Frances Kneller	1,321	3.2	−3.1
Independent	Matt Brown	529	1.3	N/A
Monster Raving Loony	Mad Mike Young	223	0.5	−0.4
Majority		355	0.9	N/A
Turnout		40,998	51.9	−9.0
Registered electors		79,067		
Labour gain from Conservative		Swing	▲23.3	

=== Elections in the 2010s ===
2019 notional result
Party	Vote	%
Conservative	31,106	66.5
Labour	9,769	20.9
Liberal Democrats	2,962	6.3
Others	1,883	4.1
Green	1,043	2.2
Turnout	46,763	60.9
Electorate	76,818	

General election 2019: Sittingbourne and Sheppey
Party	Candidate	Votes	%	±%
Conservative	Gordon Henderson	34,742	67.6	+7.4
Labour	Clive Johnson	10,263	20.0	–10.6
Liberal Democrats	Ben Martin	3,213	6.3	+3.6
Independent	Monique Bonney	1,257	2.4	N/A
Green	Sam Collins	1,188	2.3	+1.2
Monster Raving Loony	Mad Mike Young	404	0.8	0.0
Independent	Lee McCall	327	0.6	0.0
Majority		24,479	47.6	+18.0
Turnout		51,394	61.2	–1.5
Conservative hold		Swing	+9.0	

General election 2017: Sittingbourne and Sheppey
Party	Candidate	Votes	%	±%
Conservative	Gordon Henderson	30,911	60.2	+10.7
Labour	Mike Rolfe	15,700	30.6	+11.0
Independent	Mike Baldock	2,133	4.2	N/A
Liberal Democrats	Keith Nevols	1,392	2.7	–0.5
Green	Mark Lindop	558	1.1	–1.3
Monster Raving Loony	Mad Mike Young	403	0.8	+0.2
Independent	Lee McCall	292	0.6	N/A
Majority		15,211	29.6	+4.9
Turnout		51,389	62.7	–2.3
Conservative hold		Swing	–0.2	

General election 2015: Sittingbourne and Sheppey
Party	Candidate	Votes	%	±%
Conservative	Gordon Henderson	24,425	49.5	–0.5
UKIP	Richard Palmer	12,257	24.8	+19.4
Labour	Guy Nicholson	9,673	19.6	–5.0
Liberal Democrats	Keith Nevols	1,563	3.2	–13.2
Green	Gary Miller	1,185	2.4	N/A
Monster Raving Loony	Mad Mike Young	275	0.6	–0.1
Majority		12,168	24.7	–0.7
Turnout		49,378	65.0	+0.5
Conservative hold		Swing	–10.0	

General election 2010: Sittingbourne and Sheppey
Party	Candidate	Votes	%	±%
Conservative	Gordon Henderson	24,313	50.0	+8.2
Labour	Angela Harrison	11,930	24.6	–17.0
Liberal Democrats	Keith Nevols	7,943	16.4	+3.5
UKIP	Ian Davison	2,610	5.4	+3.1
BNP	Lawrence Tames	1,305	2.7	N/A
Monster Raving Loony	Mad Mike Young	319	0.7	N/A
Independent	David Cassidy	158	0.3	N/A
Majority		12,383	25.4	N/A
Turnout		48,578	64.5	+10.8
Conservative hold		Swing	+12.7	

Although its predecessor seat was narrowly retained by Labour in 2005, intervening boundary changes made the constituency notionally Conservative prior to the 2010 general election, and it is therefore listed as a hold rather than a gain.

=== Elections in the 2000s ===
General election 2005: Sittingbourne and Sheppey
Party	Candidate	Votes	%	±%
Labour	Derek Wyatt	17,051	41.8	–4.0
Conservative	Gordon Henderson	16,972	41.6	+5.1
Liberal Democrats	Jane Nelson	5,183	12.7	–1.4
UKIP	Stephen Dean	926	2.3	+0.6
Rock 'n' Roll Loony	Mad Mike Young	479	1.2	–0.6
Veritas	David Cassidy	192	0.5	N/A
Majority		79	0.2	–9.1
Turnout		40,803	53.7	–3.8
Labour hold		Swing	–4.6	

General election 2001: Sittingbourne and Sheppey
Party	Candidate	Votes	%	±%
Labour	Derek Wyatt	17,340	45.8	+5.2
Conservative	Adrian Lee	13,831	36.5	+0.1
Liberal Democrats	Elvina Lowe	5,353	14.1	–4.2
Rock 'n' Roll Loony	Mad Mike Young	673	1.8	N/A
UKIP	Robert Oakley	661	1.7	+0.7
Majority		3,509	9.3	+5.1
Turnout		37,858	57.5	–14.8
Labour hold		Swing	+2.5	

=== Elections in the 1990s ===
General election 1997: Sittingbourne and Sheppey
Party	Candidate	Votes	%
Labour	Derek Wyatt	18,723	40.6
Conservative	Roger Moate	16,794	36.4
Liberal Democrats	Roger Truelove	8,447	18.3
Referendum	Peter Moull	1,082	2.3
Monster Raving Loony	Chris "Screwy" Driver	644	1.4
UKIP	Nico Risi	472	1.0
Majority		1,929	4.2
Turnout		46,162	72.3
Labour win (new seat)			

== See also ==
- List of parliamentary constituencies in Kent
- List of parliamentary constituencies in the South East England (region)
