= Derek Wyatt =

England international rugby union player & MP (born 1949)

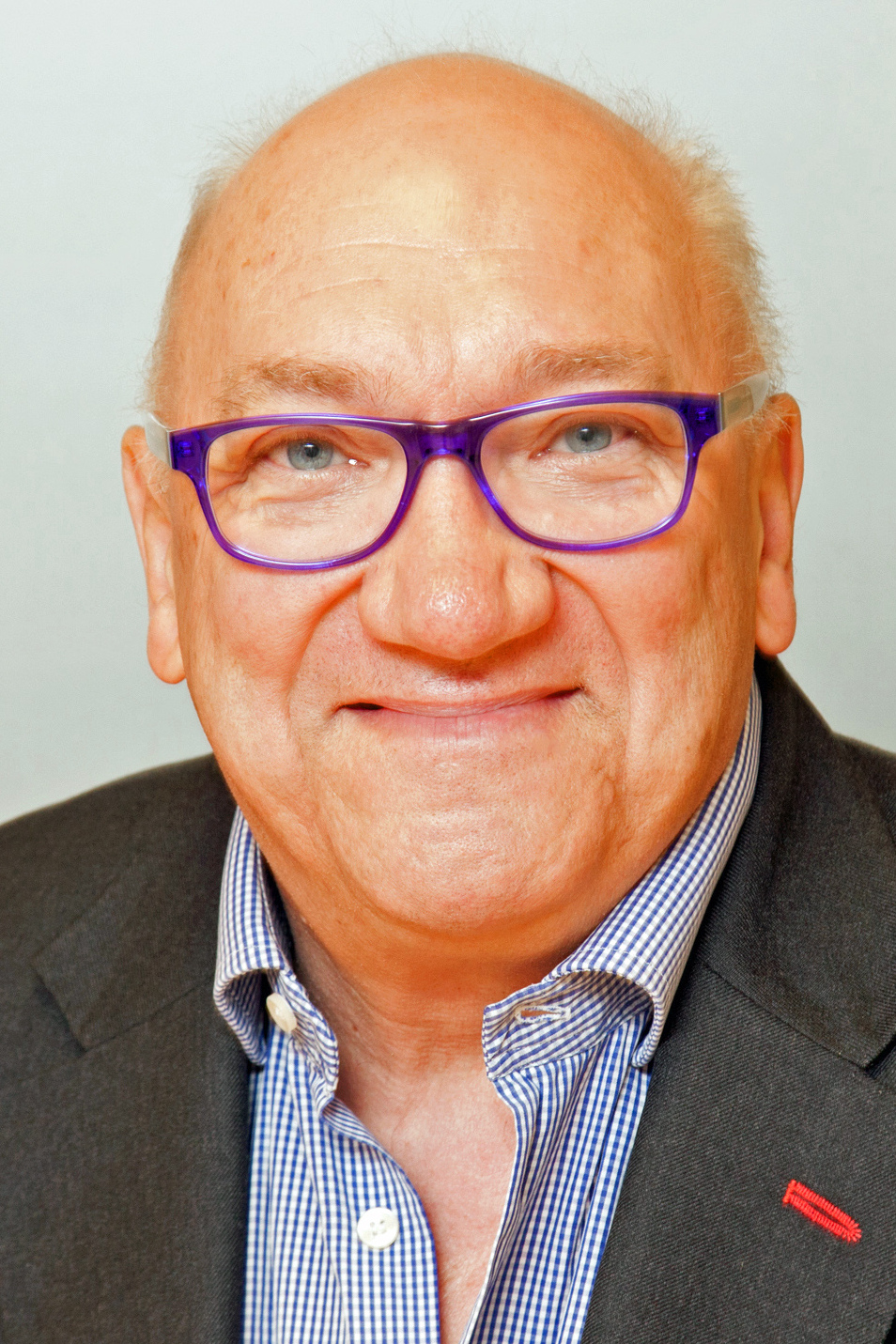
- Wyatt in 2016

Member of Parliament for Sittingbourne and Sheppey
- In office 1 May 1997 – 12 April 2010
- Preceded by: Constituency established
- Succeeded by: Gordon Henderson

Member of Haringey London Borough Council for Archway
- In office 5 May 1994 – 1995
- Succeeded by: Judy Bax

Personal details
- Born: Derek Murray Wyatt; 4 December 1949 (age 76) Woolwich, London
- Party: Labour
- Education: St Luke's College of Education (CertEd); The Open University (BA); St Catherine's College, Oxford; King's College London (MA)
- Website: derekwyatt.co.uk

Derek Murray Wyatt (born 4 December 1949) is a British politician who served as Member of Parliament (MP) for Sittingbourne and Sheppey from 1997 to 2010.

== Early life ==
Wyatt was educated in Essex, England at Westcliff Grammar School and Colchester Royal Grammar School. He attended St Luke's College, Exeter (Certificate of Education, 1968–71), the Open University (BA. Hons 2:1 Modern Art and Architecture, 1973–78), he was a mature student at St Catherine's College, Oxford, (Education, 1981–82) and King's College, London (MA, International Studies, 2016–18).

== Political career ==
Wyatt was Member of Parliament (MP) for the new constituency of Sittingbourne and Sheppey (1997–2010) having previously been a councillor in the London Borough of Haringey (1994–95) where he was also Chairman of Alexandra Palace.

He was on the Culture, Media and Sport Select Committee from 1997 to 2005 and the Public Accounts Committee in 2007 before becoming the Parliamentary Private Secretary to the Rt Hon Margaret Hodge MP, Minister for the Arts. In February 2009 he became PPS to Lord Mark Mallock-Brown at the Foreign Office. He chaired six all party committees in the House of Commons. In the votes on Iraq, he voted against intervention.

He won an ISPA Hero's Award (2006) for his work on seeing the Computer Misuse Act onto the statute book.

In the 2005 general election, he won the 3rd smallest majority of any MP, at just 79 votes, after two recounts.

On 1 July 2009, Wyatt announced he would stand down at the 2010 general election.

== Sporting career ==
Wyatt played rugby for the University of Oxford, the Barbarians and England and stopped a British and Irish Lions Tour to South Africa in 1986 with the help of Archbishop Trevor Huddleston.

Wyatt played his club rugby for Bedford where his record of 145 tries in 152 games was higher than anyone else in the club’s history as of 2016. He was later a regular for Bath where he equalled the club try scoring record (29 tries) in his first two seasons. Whilst at Oxford he won a Blue at Rugby, representing Oxford in the Varsity Match. He was Chairman of the All Party Parliamentary Rugby Union group for 13 years and introduced an annual lecture and an awards dinner.

== Awards ==
Whilst the Chair of the Royal Trinity Hospice, Wyatt was Runner Up in the Third Sector Awards 2015 Best Charity Chair UK.

Parliament of the United Kingdom
New constituency	Member of Parliament for Sittingbourne and Sheppey; 1997–2010	Succeeded by Gordon Henderson
