= Charles Stopford =

Security consultant and impostor (born 1962)

- Born: Charles Albert Stopford III; May 1962 (age 63–64); Orlando, Florida
- Other names: Christopher Edward Buckingham; Hans Peter Schmidt; Alexi Romanov
- Occupation: IT security consultant
- Known for: Living under an assumed identity for over twenty years
- Spouse: Jody Hussey (m. 1984; div. 1997)
- Children: 2
- Parent(s): Charles and Barbara Stopford
- Criminal charge: Passport fraud
- Penalty: 22 months in prison, reduced to 9 months on appeal

Charles Albert Stopford III (born May 1962) is an American imposter who posed as the Earl of Buckingham and lived under the assumed name of Christopher Buckingham for over twenty years. The press dubbed him ‘the real Jackal’ due to his use of a method described in the novel The Day of the Jackal to assume the identity of a deceased infant.

== Early life ==
Charles Stopford, the eldest of nine children, was born in Orlando, Florida, to Charles and Barbara Stopford. He is of English ancestry. Family members described him as being fascinated with British culture and adept at mimicking an English accent.

After graduating high school in 1980, Stopford enlisted in the US Navy. Upon being discharged, he found employment at Walt Disney World in the United Kingdom Pavilion at Epcot, where he would speak with an English accent while entertaining visitors.

Stopford left the United States following a conviction for possessing explosives. He was initially sentenced to probation but was jailed for 60 days for a probation violation. He fled the country in 1983 after being released from jail.

== Christopher Buckingham ==
In 1983 Stopford assumed the identity of Christopher Edward Buckingham, an infant who died eight months after birth. Using information obtained from London's archive of births, deaths and marriages, Stopford was able to procure a National Insurance number, a National Health Card and a passport under Buckingham's name.

As Buckingham, Stopford affected an upper-class British accent. He claimed to be the son of diplomats who died in a plane crash in Egypt in 1982. He also claimed to have attended Harrow School and Cambridge University, and to be the owner of a manor house. Beginning in 1997, he adopted the title 'Earl of Buckingham', a peerage that has been extinct since 1687, and claimed to have a seat in the House of Lords. He had stationery which bore the moniker 'Lord Buckingham' and a Buckingham coat of arms which had last been held in the early 1700s.

He met Jody Hussey, a 19 year old Canadian student, while in West Germany in 1984. They married on December 7, 1984, at Watford Registry Office. They had two children, Lindsey and Edward, before divorcing in 1997.

Stopford lived in both England and Germany, where he rented an apartment in Hohentengen. He was working as an information technology security consultant in Switzerland at the time of his arrest.

Stopford is also known to have used the names Hans Peter Schmidt and Alexi Romanov.

== Arrest and identification ==
Whilst attempting to enter England from France in January 2005, Stopford was arrested when a passport check found that his personal information matched with that of a deceased infant. Stopford refused to reveal his true identity and nationality, leading to tabloid speculation he could have been a fugitive or a former East German spy. In an effort to determine Stopford's nationality, a recording of his police interview was sent to several forensic speech experts who analyzed his speech patterns and concluded he was likely American. On 11 October he pleaded guilty to making an untrue statement to obtain a passport. He was convicted of passport fraud and sentenced to 22 months in HM Prison Elmley. His sentence was reduced to 9 months on appeal and he was released into the custody of the UK Immigration Service in February 2006.

Stopford was identified when his family recognized him from a photograph in a news story and contacted British authorities. His identity was confirmed by a fingerprint check. He was deported from the United Kingdom and returned to Florida in July 2006. Stopford reunited with his family but claimed not to remember his past due to having suffered amnesia as a result of a car accident in 2002.

== In media ==
The Stopford case was the subject of the Sky One documentary The Real Jackal and was featured in the BBC Three series Bizarre Crimes. Stopford's daughter wrote an article about her father, which was published in Cosmopolitan Magazine.
