= Kevin McKenna (politician) =

British politician (born 1974)

Kevin McKenna MP
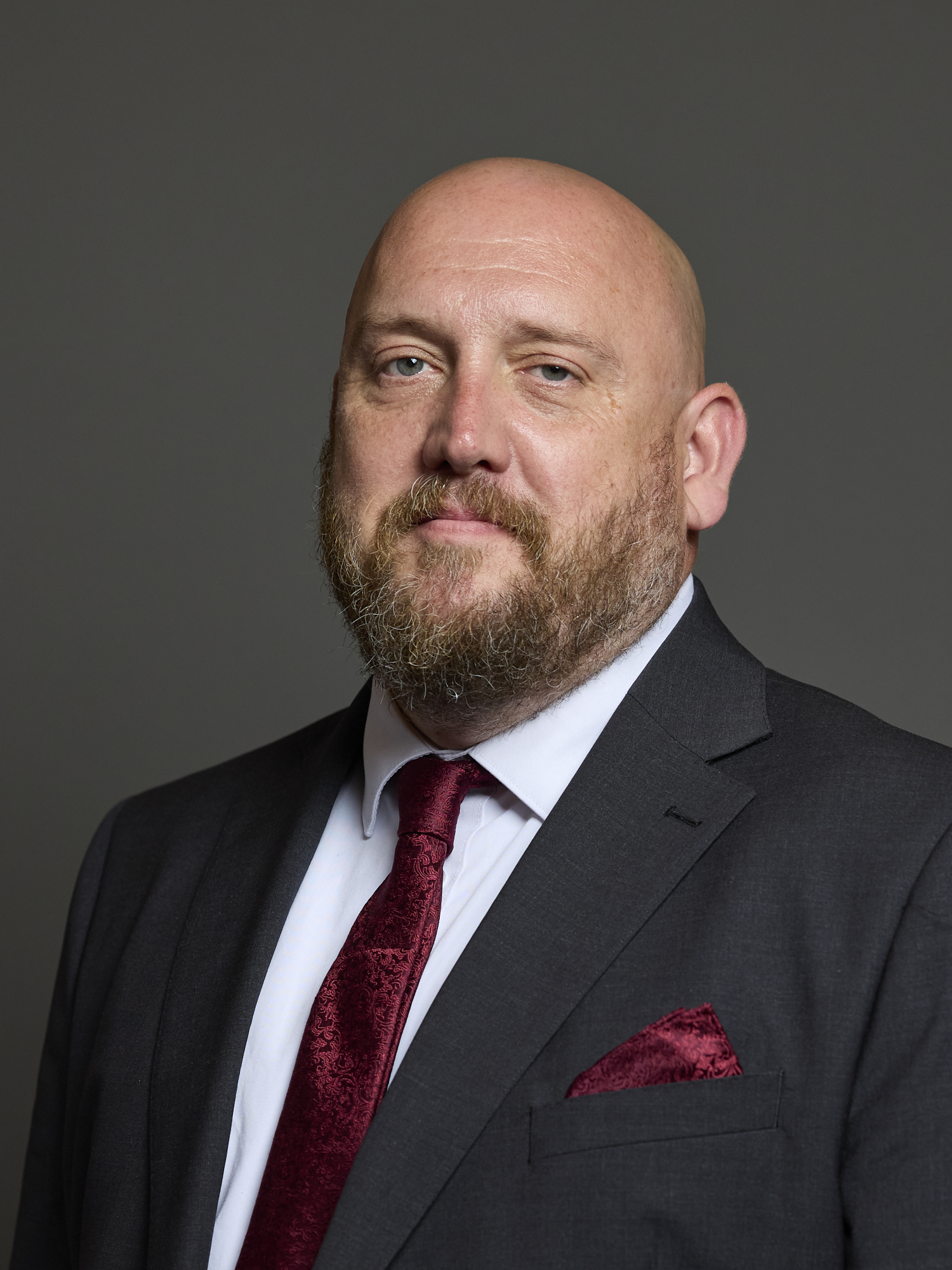
- Official portrait, 2024

Member of Parliament for Sittingbourne and Sheppey
- Incumbent
- Assumed office 4 July 2024
- Preceded by: Gordon Henderson
- Majority: 355 (0.9%)

Personal details
- Born: 1974 (age 51–52) Erith, London, England
- Party: Labour
- Education: Chislehurst and Sidcup Grammar School
- Alma mater: University of Warwick (BSc); King's College London (MSc)
- Occupation: Politician; nurse
- Website: kevinmckenna.co.uk

Kevin McKenna (born 1974) is a British Labour Party politician who has been the Member of Parliament (MP) for Sittingbourne and Sheppey since 2024. He gained the seat from the Conservative Party.

== Early life and career ==
McKenna was born in Erith and grew up in Welling, in the London Borough of Bexley. He was educated at St Stephen's Catholic Primary School in Welling and Chislehurst and Sidcup Grammar School.

McKenna studied microbiology at the University of Warwick and later qualified as a registered nurse in the 1990s at the Nightingale Institute at King's College London, a career change he made after exposure to the work of nurses caring for his friends impacted by the AIDS epidemic. He worked in the NHS as a frontline nurse in critical care in a number of London hospitals including University College London Hospitals NHS Foundation Trust and later in strategy on nationwide NHS programmes at NHS England. In 2015, McKenna was a Darzi Fellow in clinical leadership.

During the COVID-19 pandemic, McKenna worked as a matron at NHS Nightingale Hospital London.

McKenna decided to go into politics as a result of his post at NHS England, which he said made him want to create policy rather than administer it, and because of a lack of representation for nurses in Westminster. He was unsuccessful as the Labour candidate for the Bexley and Bromley at the 2024 London Assembly election. He was selected as the Labour candidate for Sittingbourne and Sheppey on 23 May 2024.

McKenna was elected as an officer of the All-party parliamentary group for Health in October 2024. He was one of only seven MPs from a healthcare background to sign a letter calling on Parliament to back assisted dying legislation, saying it would benefit patients.

== Personal life ==
McKenna lives in Sittingbourne with his husband. He is a self-professed "Lego geek".

On 13 February 2025, McKenna announced in the House of Commons that he is living with HIV.

== Election results ==
General election 2024: Sittingbourne and Sheppey
Party	Candidate	Votes	%	±%
Labour	Kevin McKenna	11,919	29.1	+8.2
Conservative	Aisha Cuthbert	11,564	28.2	−38.3
Reform	William Fotheringham-Bray	10,512	25.6	N/A
Swale Ind.	Mike Baldock	3,238	7.9	N/A
Green	Sam Banks	1,692	4.1	+1.9
Liberal Democrats	Frances Kneller	1,321	3.2	−3.1
Independent	Matt Brown	529	1.3	N/A
Monster Raving Loony	Mad Mike Young	223	0.5	−0.4
Majority		355	0.9	N/A
Turnout		40,998	51.9	−9.0
Registered electors		79,067		
Labour gain from Conservative		Swing	▲23.3	

Parliament of the United Kingdom
Preceded by Gordon Henderson	Member of Parliament for Sittingbourne and Sheppey; 2024–present	Incumbent
