= Scottish Prison Officers' Association =

Former Scottish trade union

The Scottish Prison Officers' Association (SPOA) was the only official trade union representing operational prison staff in Scotland.

The union was founded in 1971, when the Scottish section of the Prison Officers' Association (POA) decided to split away. It affiliated to both the Trades Union Congress and the Scottish Trades Union Congress, and by 1980 had 2,344 members.

For some years, the union was led by William Goodall, who was himself imprisoned for embezzling a death benefit due to one of its deceased member's families. In 2000, the union merged back in to the POA.

== General Secretaries ==
1971: John Renton
1989: William Goodall
1990s: Derek Turner
