= Gordon Henderson (politician) =

British politician (born 1948)

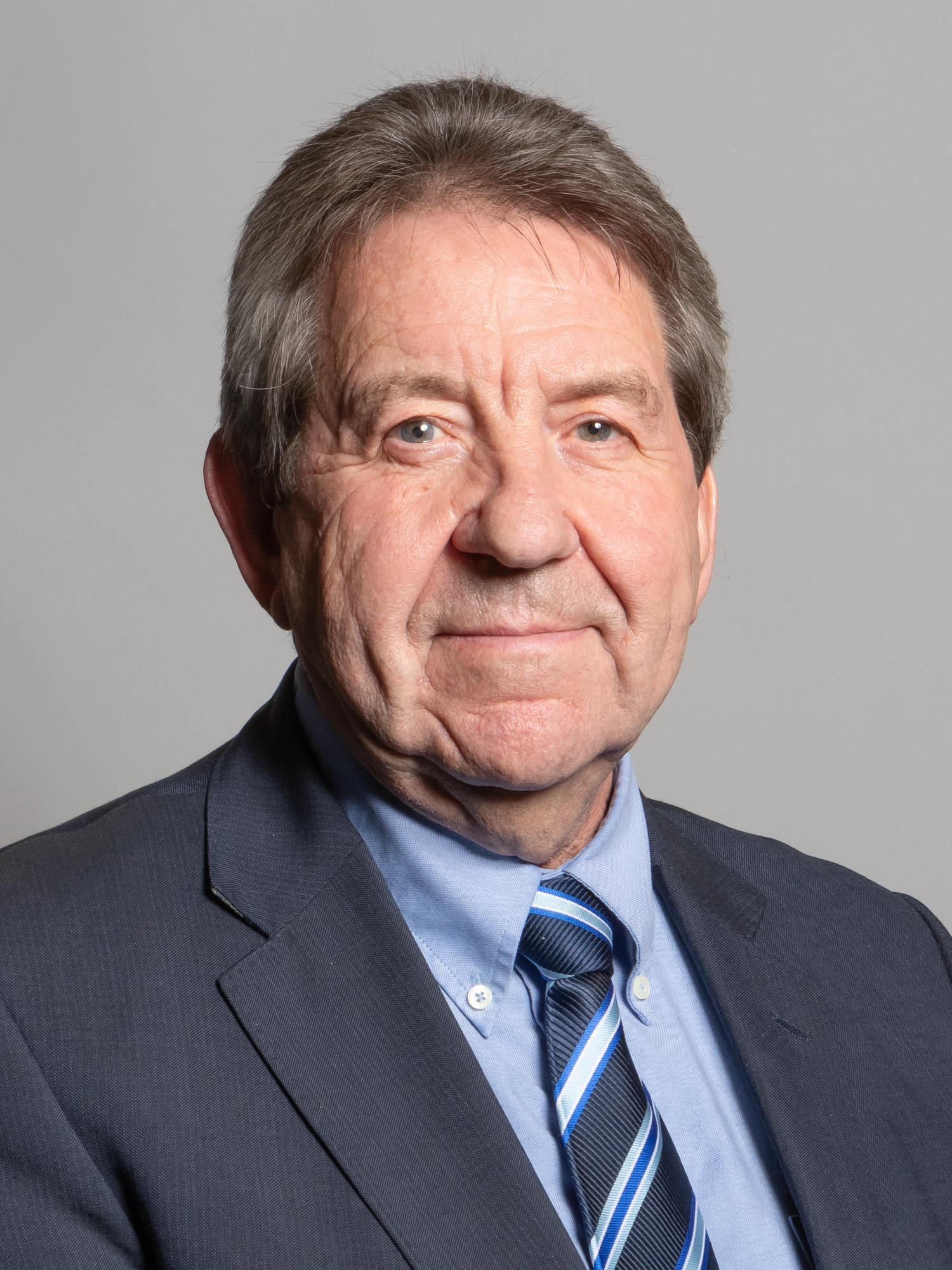
- Official portrait, 2020

Member of Parliament for Sittingbourne and Sheppey
- In office 6 May 2010 – 30 May 2024
- Preceded by: Derek Wyatt
- Succeeded by: Kevin McKenna

Personal details
- Born: 27 January 1948 (age 78) Gillingham, Kent, England
- Party: Conservative
- Children: 3
- Occupation: Operations manager, contracts officer, store manager
- Website: gordonhendersonmp.org.uk

Gordon Henderson (born 27 January 1948) is a British politician. A member of the Conservative Party, he served as the Member of Parliament (MP) for the Sittingbourne and Sheppey constituency in Kent from 2010 to 2024.

== Professional career ==
Henderson left school at 16 and started work as a stockroom assistant in a Woolworths shop in Chatham. He advanced through the ranks of the company, becoming a senior store manager. Henderson left Woolworths in 1979 after 15 years with the company.

After leaving Woolworths, Henderson went through a range of jobs and ran his own restaurant in South Africa. He was also a senior contracts officer for GEC Marconi, and worked for a Rochester based wine company. Before entering parliament he worked as an operations manager for an alcohol-based gifts company.

== Political career ==
Henderson has a long-standing interest in politics. He was a Conservative Party political agent and was the constituency agent for North Thanet MP, Roger Gale.

Henderson has served as deputy leader of Swale Borough Council twice and was also a member of Kent County Council, during which time he sat both on the education committee and the Kent Police Authority.

In the 2001 general election, Henderson contested the seat of Luton South where he came 2nd, 10,133 votes behind the incumbent Labour MP Margaret Moran. In the 2005 general election, Henderson contested the Sittingbourne and Sheppey and came second, losing by only 79 votes to the incumbent Labour MP Derek Wyatt.

In the 2010 general election, Henderson stood again in Sittingbourne and Sheppey, and was elected as the MP, receiving a 12,383 majority with 50.0% of the vote.

Henderson was re-elected at the 2015 general election with a slightly decreased majority of 12,168 and a slightly decreased vote share of 49.5%.

He was a supporter of the Better Off Out campaign which called for the United Kingdom to leave the European Union. In 2010, he had stated that the non-Conservative politician he most admired was Nigel Farage. In 2014, Henderson responded to speculation about a possible defection to UKIP by issuing a statement saying defection was something he had considered, but he viewed their other policies as "muddled and contradictory".

At the snap 2017 general election, Henderson was again re-elected, increasing his vote share to 60.2% and his majority to 15,211.

During the 2019 general election Henderson increased his vote share at the election by over 7% to 67.6% He increased his majority from 15,211 to 24,479.

In March 2023, Henderson announced he would retire at the 2024 general election.

== Personal life ==
Henderson was born in Gillingham. He is married to his third wife with three children, and has seven grandchildren. Henderson has lived on the Isle of Sheppey for over 30 years. He is a long time supporter of Gillingham F.C. and Partick Thistle F.C. Henderson has been involved in local voluntary work, as an instructor in the Army Cadet Force, as a director of the SWIM training centre in Sittingbourne and as a school governor at Eastchurch Primary School in Sheppey and the Cheyne Middle School in Sheppey. He is currently chairman of Litter Angels, which holds annual workshops in primary schools across Sittingbourne and Sheppey and runs an anti-litter poster competition.

Parliament of the United Kingdom
| Preceded by Derek Wyatt | Member of Parliament for Sittingbourne and Sheppey; 2010–2024 | Succeeded by Kevin McKenna |
