= HM Prison Standford Hill =

Men's prison in Kent, England

HMP Standford Hill
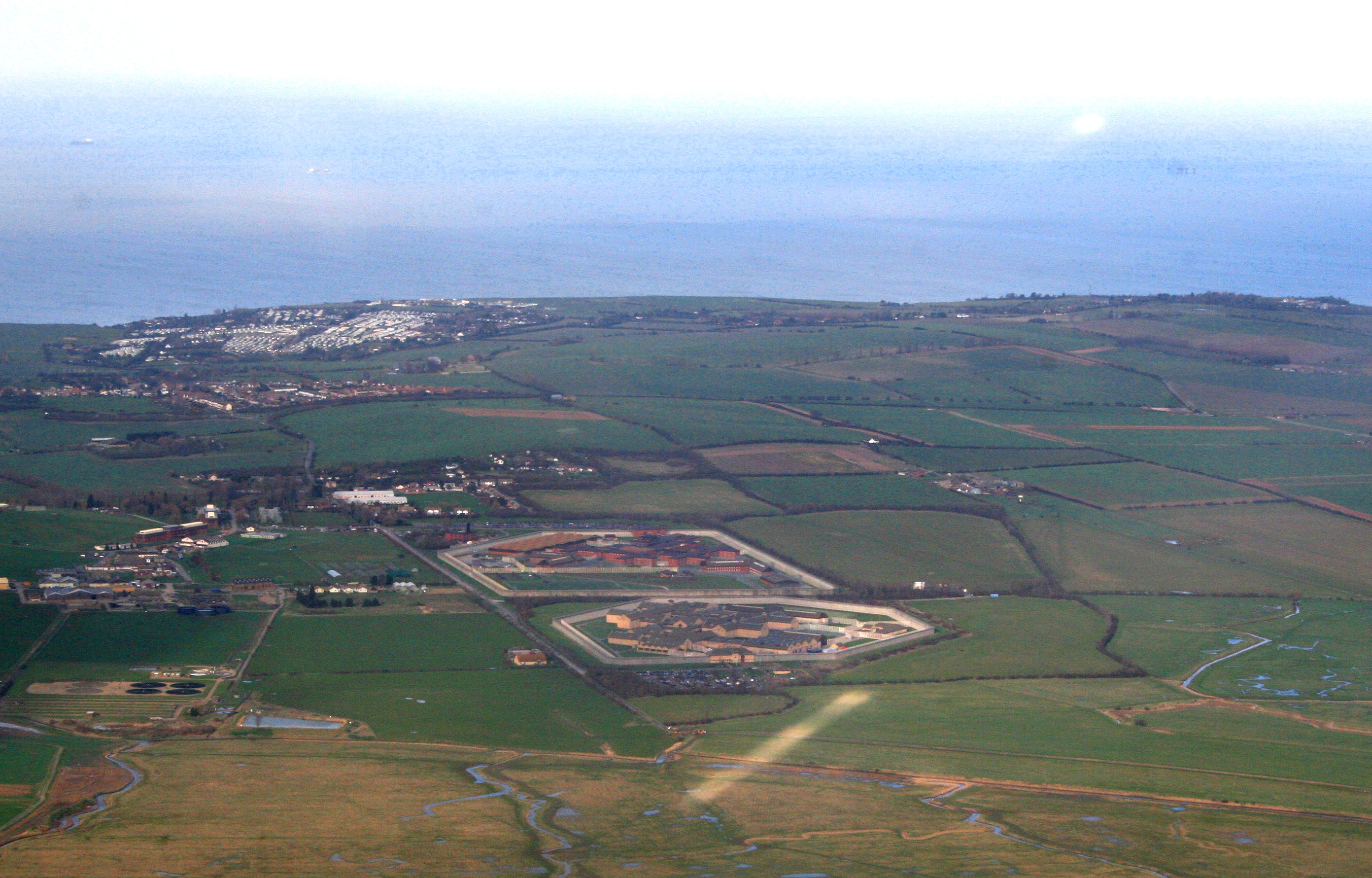
- Prisons, Sheppey Cluster, Isle of Sheppey

- Location in Kent
- Location: Eastchurch, Kent; 51.3952°N 0.8488°E
- Security class: Adult Male/Category D
- Population: 462 (July 2008)
- Opened: 1950
- Managed by: HM Prison Services
- Governor: Gary Price
- Website: Standford Hill at justice.gov.uk

HM Prison Standford Hill (Sheppey Cluster) is a Category D men's prison, located close to the village of Eastchurch on the Isle of Sheppey, Kent. Standford Hill forms part of the Sheppey prisons cluster, which also includes HMP Elmley and HMP Swaleside. The prison is operated by His Majesty's Prison Service.

== History ==
Standford Hill was opened on the site of an ex Royal Air Force station, and was first used as a prison in 1950. The complex has been redeveloped since then, and the current buildings on the site date from 1986.

In December 2004, an inspection report from Her Majesty's Chief Inspector of Prisons stated that Standford Hill was not effective as a resettlement prison, and did not offer inmates worthwhile skills. The report also criticised the activities offered to prisoners. However inspectors did find "'significant' progress had been made in safety and respect" at the prison. Another inspection took place in December 2011 which found that outcomes were reasonable in most areas, yet there were still some significant areas of concern. The range of activities available was now considered to be good, but resettlement work was fragmented.

In January 2013 three inmates escaped from the prison. A further two prisoners absconded in June 2014. Another prisoner escaped in August 2014.

== The prison today ==
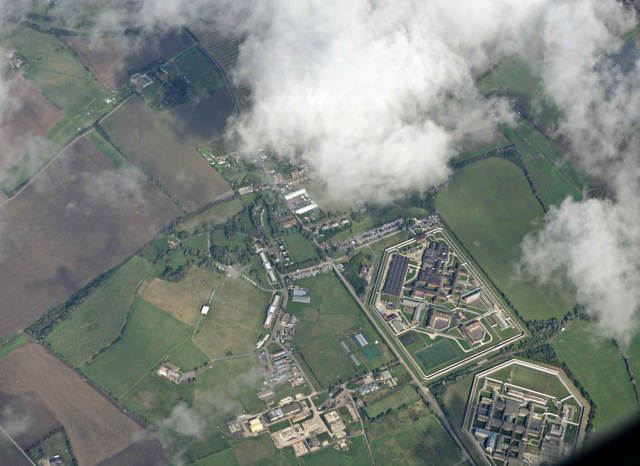
Sheppey Prisons Cluster in 2015

Standford Hill is a Category D open prison for adult males serving any sentence, with a maximum of 5 years to their release, and a maximum of 2 years to their parole eligibility date. The prison offers employment for inmates through its workshop, works, and horticulture departments, and also offers full and part-time education classes.

== Notable former inmates ==
- Jonathan Aitken
- Jim Devine
- Baron Taylor of Warwick
- Stephen Jackley
- Kenneth Noye
