= Stephen Jackley =

British writer and convicted robber

Stephen Jackley is a convicted British robber and author. He served time in American and British prisons from 2008 to 2015. He has Asperger syndrome, and his book, Just Sky, explores the impact of this condition on his life. Jackley has been followed by the press, both in the United States and the United Kingdom, because of the unusual nature of his crimes.

== Biography ==
Jackley was born in Exeter, Devon.

In 2008, Jackley was arrested in the United States, after getting caught in Vermont using a fake ID to buy a firearm. A year later, he was returned to the United Kingdom where he was convicted of a series of armed robbery related offences on banks, building societies and bookmakers. Jackley's offences stood out owing to his use of "calling cards" and statements that he believed himself a "modern day Robin Hood", who allegedly gave some of his loot to charities and homeless people. What made his offences more unusual was that he was then a student at Worcester University, studying sociology and geography. He went on to appeal his sentence, which the Court of Appeal reduced from 13 to 12 years on the basis of his condition, Asperger's Syndrome, making prison life harder than for other offenders. Whilst in custody he took up a string of court cases, involving prisoners access to IT equipment for legal representation, and a 'home detention curfew' policy.

Jackley was released in May 2015. It has been reported, that he is a trustee and national coordinator of the UK prison-reform organisation, Justice in Prisons. He is actively involved in penal issues and prisoner rehabilitation. He also started a consultancy social enterprise called StarUp CIC in 2016, of which he is named as a director.

== Works ==
Jackley has published books including Just Sky (an autobiography) and Good Intentions (a crime thriller), and anthologies of short stories/essays. In early 2015, he helped found the publishing enterprise, Arkbound Ltd, where he is managing editor of the Bristol magazine Boundless.
