= Eastchurch =

Village in Kent, England

Coordinates: 51.400002°N 0.866667°E

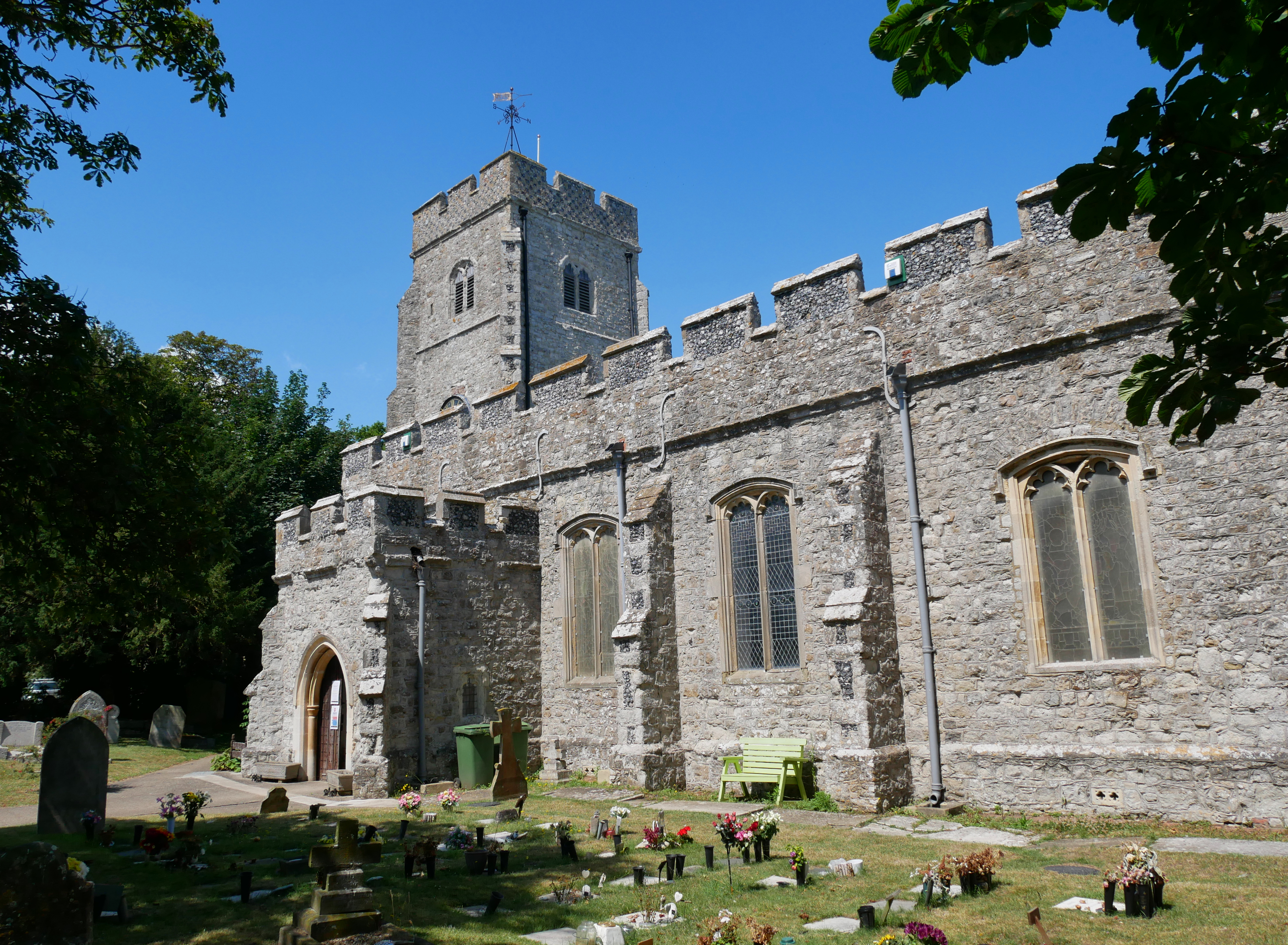
- The Church of All Saints in Eastchurch, Isle of Sheppey

- Location within Kent
- Population: 3,022 (2011 Census)
- OS grid reference: TQ988714
- District: Swale
- Shire county: Kent
- Region: South East
- Country: England
- Sovereign state: United Kingdom
- Post town: Sheerness
- Postcode district: ME12
- Dialling code: 01795
- Police: Kent
- Fire: Kent
- Ambulance: South East Coast
- UK Parliament: Sittingbourne and Sheppey

Eastchurch is a village and civil parish on the Isle of Sheppey, in the English county of Kent, two miles east of Minster. The village website claims the area has "a history steeped in stories of piracy and smugglers".

== Aviation history ==
Eastchurch is styled the "home of British aviation" as Eastchurch airfield saw the first controlled flight by a British pilot on British soil.

The Eastchurch airfield played a significant role in the history of British aviation from 1909 when Frank McClean acquired Stonepits Farm, on the marshes across from Leysdown, converting the land into an airfield for members of the Aero Club of Great Britain.

The Short Brothers, Horace, Eustace and Oswald, built aircraft at Battersea to be tested at the site; later Moore-Brabazon, A. K. Huntington, Charles S. Rolls and Cecil Grace all visited and used the flying club's services. Wilbur Wright and his brother Orville came to the Isle of Sheppey to visit the new flying grounds of the Aero Club. In 1909, Moore-Brabazon made the first live cargo flight by fixed-wing aircraft, tying a waste-paper basket to a wing strut of his Shorts-built Wright aircraft. Then, using it as a "cargo hold", he airlifted one small pig.

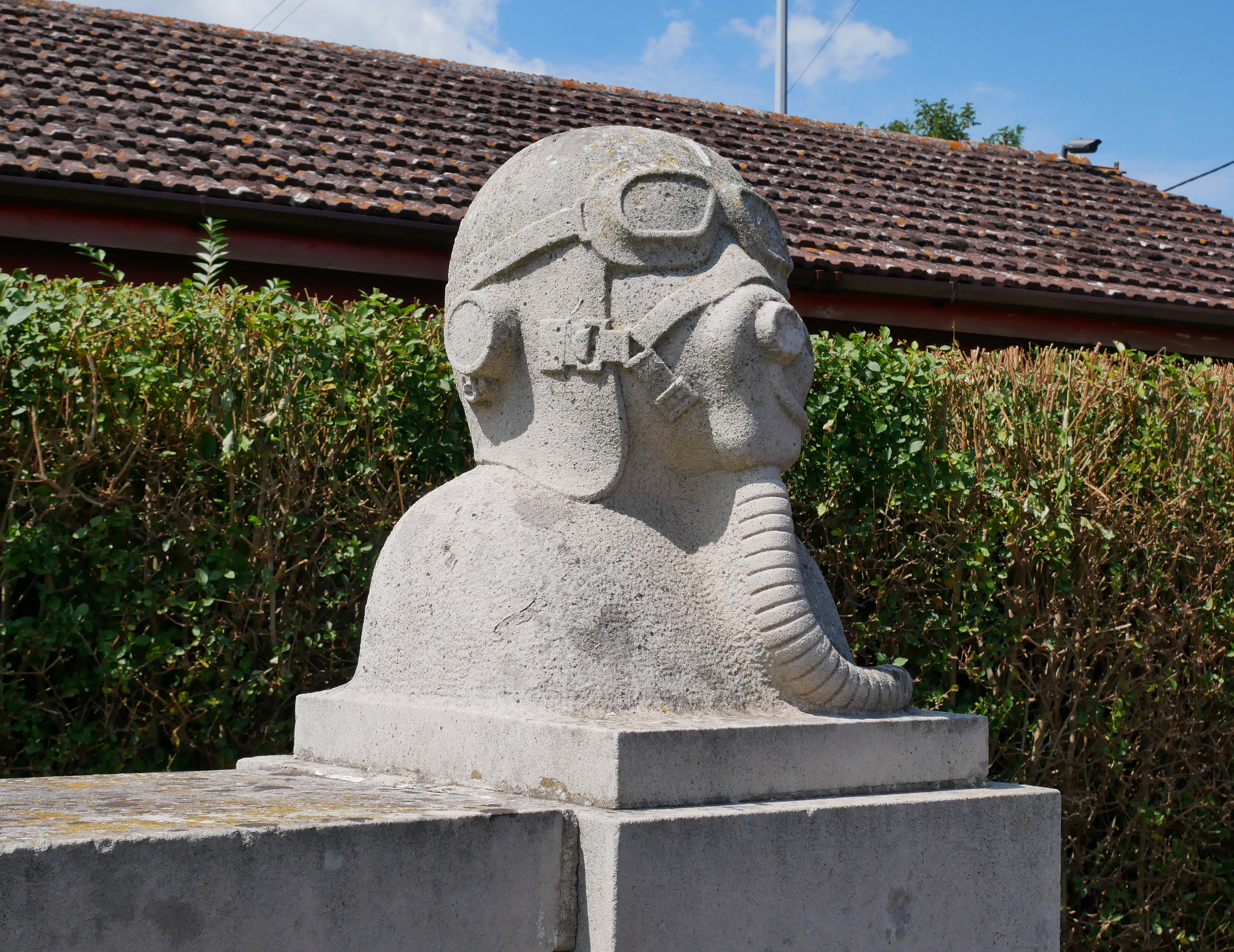
Detail on the Memorial to the Home of Aviation in Eastchurch

The Eastchurch airfield was also the site, in July 1911, of the competition for the Gordon Bennett Trophy for powered air racing, attended by flyers from all over the world and won that year by the American pilot C. T. Weymann. During the Battle of Britain, it was one of the notable bases of the Polish Air Force.

A stained glass window by Karl Parsons in the south side of All Saints' Church, Eastchurch (built in 1432), was dedicated to Rolls and Grace, who were killed in July and December 1910 respectively. The Memorial to the Home of Aviation was unveiled in 1955, in the centre of the village opposite the church.

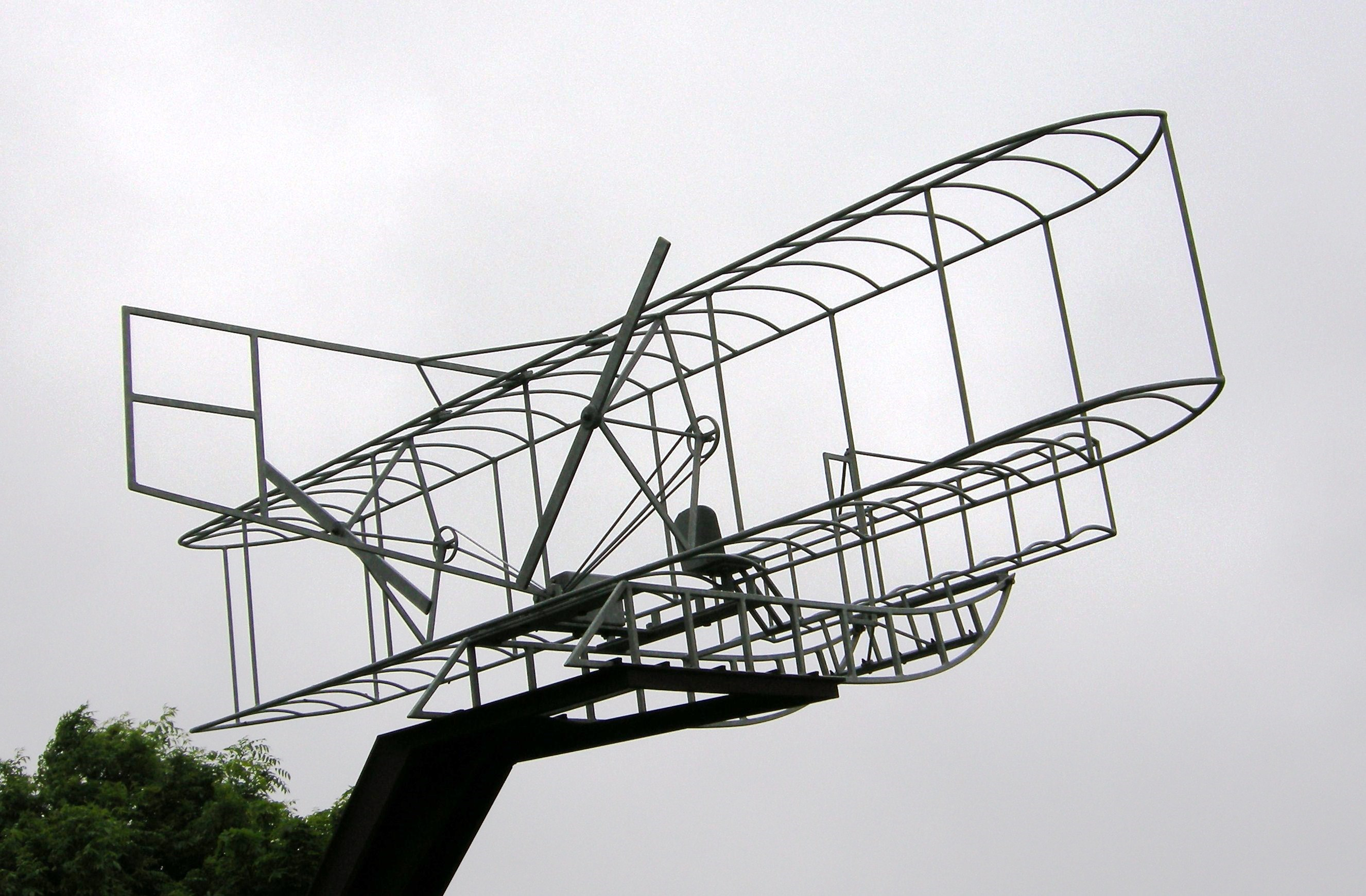
Sculpture on the edge of Eastchurch depicting a Short Brothers biplane, unveiled in July 2009 to mark the centenary of British aviation

In July 2009, Eastchurch celebrated 100 years of aviation history associated with the Island. SkySheppey brought together a number of associations and joined with many visitors to recognise the importance of British aviation history which started in Eastchurch. The organisers, the Eastchurch Parish Council, planned the event for 25 and 26 July 2009. Eastchurch is also home to many forms of aircraft and is where they were originally developed in the early 1900s, notably by Short Brothers.

== Buildings ==
The gatehouse is now all that remains of Shurland Hall, connected with many families including the Cheneys who were there in 1274; and Sir John Stanley, who was Lord Warden of the Cinque Ports in the 15th century. It was also rumoured to have housed Henry VIII and his wife, Anne Boleyn, for a few nights. For a short period before it was acquired by the Spitalfields Trust in 2006, it was owned by Violet Searle, a business woman who developed an early house within the village in Warden Road. The gatehouse is now in the care of the Spitalfields Trust and in the process of being renovated and restored.

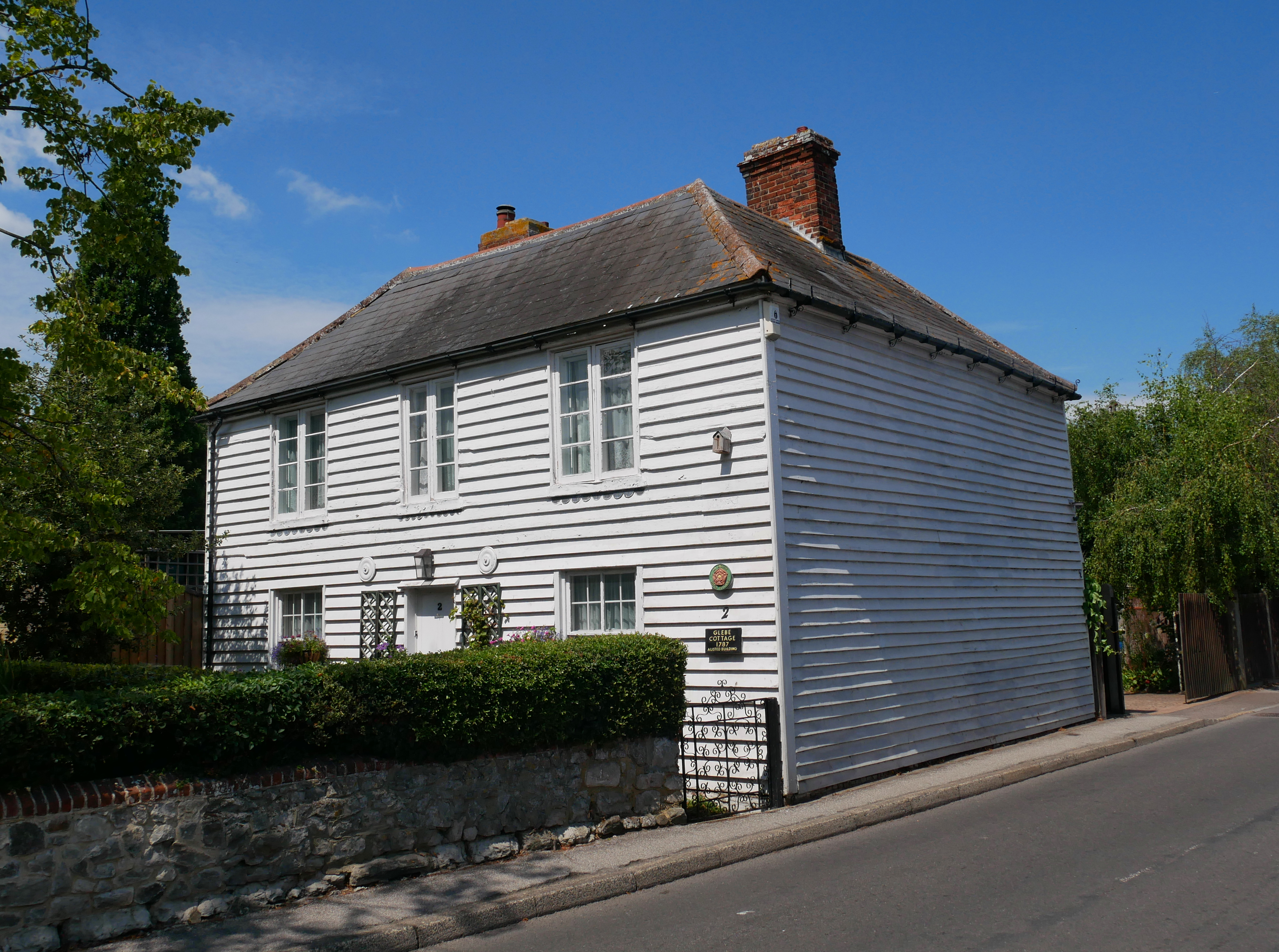
The eighteenth-century building at 2 Warden Road

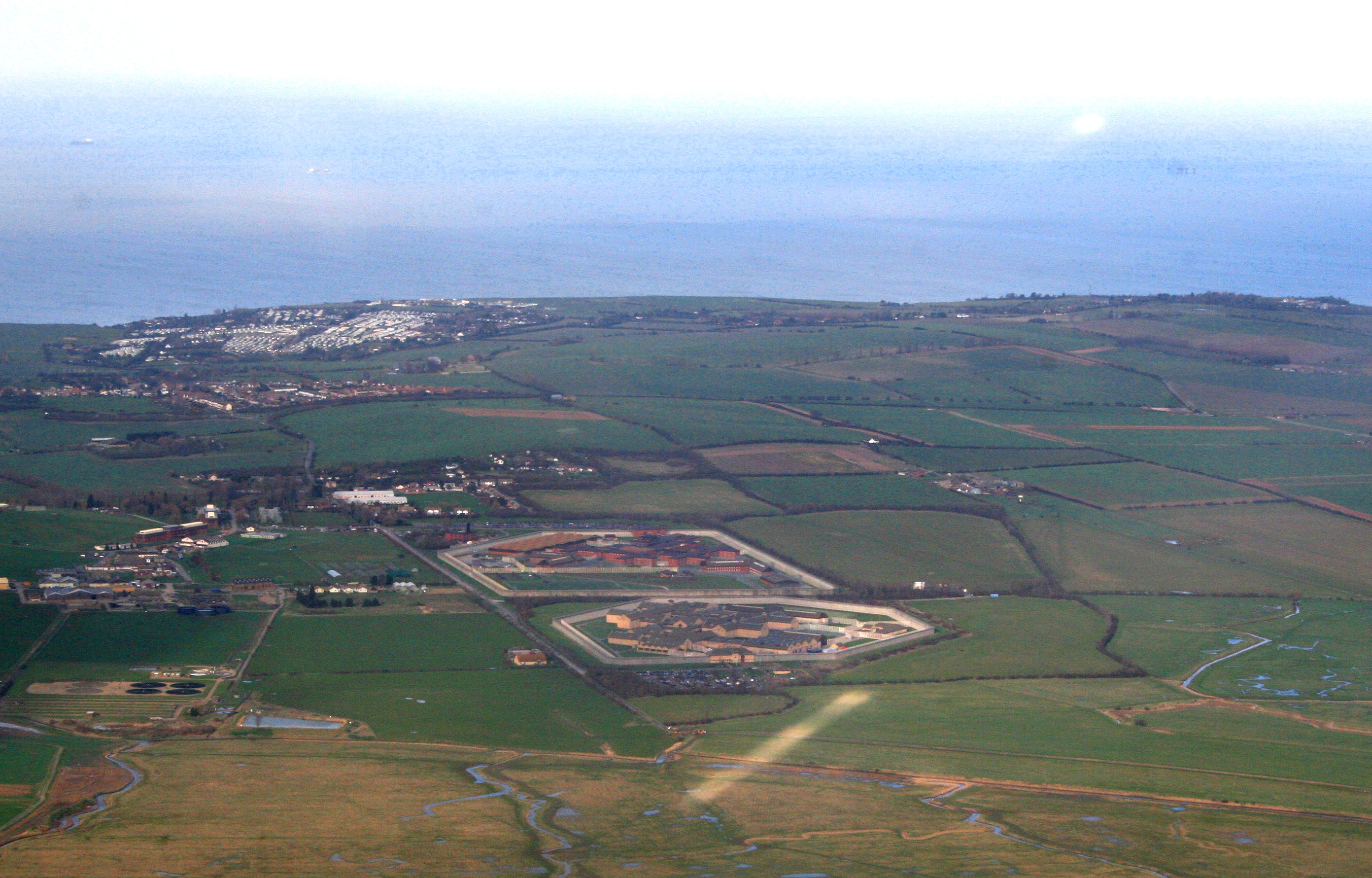
Prisons and the village from the air

In Hidden Kent by Alan Major (Countryside Books, 1994), there is a note from the 1847 gazetteer commenting on the scarcity of fresh water which "makes the inhabitants very careful to preserve such falls from the clouds" and tells of spouts from the church designed to fill large tubs around it in the churchyard.

Royal Navy Shore Station HMS Pembroke II was RNAS Eastchurch, Sheppey, Kent. An accounting base, it was operational from June 1913 to 1 April 1918 when it was turned over to the RAF. Also known as HMS Pembroke 2, it moved to Chatham as an accounting base from 1940 to 1957. The Shore Station was named after the nearby main base, HMS Pembroke I at the royal Dockyard in Chatham.

Eastchurch is also home to three prisons, HMP Elmley, HMP Standford Hill and HMP Swaleside. The prisons complex is known as the Sheppey Prisons Cluster.

== All Saints’ Church ==
All Saints Church is in the centre of the village, it is a large and extravagant church. Currently, the parish is in interregnum as of June 2016, the previous Parish Priest, Rector Chris Shipley, retired. He took the Parish from the Reverend Father Barry Birch SSC, who had been there since October 2008. His predecessor, Father Francis Searle, was the parish priest from September 2000 until his death in 2007. Father Searle was the grandson of Violet Searle.

The church has undergone the "Jubilee Project", also known as the "tower appeal". This involved bringing down the bells and restoring them (for the first time in 100 years). The tower itself has been modernised and a new floor and room added. This is now known as the "Jubilee Room" and is funded by sponsors such as the Shurland Hotel.
