= POA (trade union) =

UK trade union

- The Professional Trade Union for Prison, Correctional, Public and Private Mental Health Trust Services Providers and Immigration Services
- Founded: 1939; 87 years ago
- Headquarters: London, England
- Location: United Kingdom
- Members: ▲36,715 (2024)
- General Secretary: Steve Gillan
- Deputy General Secretary: Mick Pimblett
- Affiliations: TUC; ICTU; STUC; TUCG; NSSN
- Website: poauk.org.uk

The POA: The Professional Trade Union for Prison, Correctional, Public and Private Mental Health Trust Services Providers and Immigration Services, also known as the Prison Officers' Association (POA), is a trade union in the United Kingdom. It currently has a membership over 30,000.

== Background ==
The roots of the POA can be traced back to the launch in 1910 of the underground magazine, Prison Officers' Magazine, under the editorship of Fred Ludlow, the magazine was otherwise known as the 'Red-Un' after the colour of its cover. After the editorship was taken over by E. R. Ramsey (Hubert Witchard) in 1915 and a more radical tone was adopted, this led in 1916 to the formation of the Prison Officers' Federation, which affiliated to the Labour Party in the same year. By July 1915, around 500 out of a total of 4000 staff had joined the union, but many became disillusioned and left after the POF failed to win a petition for a war time bonus for prison officers. The POF amalgamated in 1918 with its rival union the National Union of Police and Prison Officers (NUPPO) which had been formed in 1913.

=== 1918/19 Police Strike ===
However, following police strikes in 1918 & 1919, where 70 prison officers at HM Prison Wormwood Scrubs and a few from Birmingham joined the strike, all of whom were dismissed, trade unions of police and prison workers were made illegal. Instead, a representative body, the Prison Officer's Representation Board was created, but this was seen as an inadequate measure to defend prison officers' interests. This was appointed by and responsible to the Home Office, could not call a strike and were not permitted to have formal links with other labour organisations through the Trades Union Congress or Scottish Trades Union Congress. Whilst the Representation Board failed to secure most of improvements in prison officers conditions it argued for, it did secure the replacement of the term 'warder' by 'officer'.

== Foundation ==
The above situation began to change in 1936, when a group of prison officers, including Harley Cronin, who had become weary of the failure of Representative Boards to win concessions were elected to the Central Board. One of the first moves of this group was to procure the services of William Brown and Len White of the Civil Service Clerical Association to help them negotiate with the Prisons Service through a series of secret meetings. The Central Board members made a formal demand to the Home Secretary, Sir Samuel Hoare, that Prison Officers should have the right to appeal to an Independent Arbitration Board against employers' decisions and to have access to outside assistance in doing so. These demands were recognised and Brown and White, began formally pushing for the right to use the Civil Service Arbitration Tribunal, which was also conceded. In celebration of winning these demands prison officers held a meeting on 5 April 1938 at the Blue Gliss Hall in Acton.

A claim for improved pay for prison officers was presented in May 1938 through this mechanism, and on 1 June 1938 won a 10% pay increase. The central board members then pushed to be treated as civil servants and for an extension of the system of Whitley Councils in that sector to prisons. The POA was granted a certificate of approval by the Treasury on 25 September 1939 and came into being with 3,500 members.

== The post-war years ==
The years following the second world war saw a large increase in the size of the prison population. Despite a large prison building programme including 17 medium security and open prisons and borstals, prisons became more and more overcrowded leading to the introduction of 'threeing-up'. The abolition of the death penalty also led to introduction into the prison system of large numbers of decade-spanning sentences for convicted serious offenders.

All these factors led to deteriorating pay, conditions and overstretching of prison officers, which led to a rising tide of disputes in the 1970s, Fitzgerald and Sim note that

"In each year between 1973 and 1975, prison officers took action on an average of seven occasions. In 1976, the number rose to thirty-four, in 1977 to forty-two and in 1978 to 114. The number of institutions involved in these disputes showed a similar increase. Over fifty different forms of action were taken by officers during this period, classified by the Home Office into three major groups. Firstly, actions which interfered with the administration of justice; for example, refusal to escort prisoners to and from courts, refusal to allow lawyers, probation officers or police to visit prisoners, and refusal to act as dock officers in Crown Courts. Secondly, thirty-nine types of action which interfered with the administration of the prisons, ranging from refusal to co-operate with civilian workers, welfare staff, and disciplinary proceedings and the refusal to allow workshops to function, to the refusal to fly the flag at half-mast on the death of Archbishop Makarios. Thirdly, action which directly with the prison regime, including bans on visits, education classes, letters, bathing, laundry, and association."

In 1971, the Scottish Prison Officers' Association broke away from the POA, but it rejoined in 2000.

== Trade union status ==
Questions were raised about the POA's status in the 1990s. In 1994, a legal decision determined that it was illegal to induce prison officers to take industrial action – a law which had applied to police officers since 1919 – meaning that the POA could not call strike action amongst its members. New labour legislation introduced by the Conservative government in 1992 laid down that the POA could no longer be a trade union. This was reversed in the Criminal Justice and Public Order Act 1994, but prison officers were still denied the right to take industrial action. This right was restored in 2004 to prison officers in the public sector in England, Wales and Scotland, but not in Northern Ireland or to prison officers in the private sector.

On 29 August 2007, the POA started a 24-hour walkout of prisons, picketing establishments asking Prison Officers not to attend work for their shift. This was the first ever national strike action taken by the POA. The POA reported that 90% of its members (27,000) went on strike that day.

In January 2008, the Home Secretary announced that the government planned to reintroduce powers to ban strikes by Prison Officers in England and Wales. However, the Scottish Government has ruled out similar measures for Prison Officers in Scotland.

Undeterred by the restriction upon the ability to take industrial action, on 10 May 2012 the POA called a 5-hour strike action in support of fellow TUC affiliated Trade Unions in protest against the Government imposed changes to the Civil Service Pension Scheme.

This strike action launched the emotive campaign "68 is too late" which led the way in the POA's struggle towards raising public awareness that POA members do one of the most dangerous jobs in society. The primary intention of this campaign was to alter Government policy on refusing to recognise Prison Officers as "Uniformed workers" similar to the armed forces and Police, and instead, linking the retirement age of a Prison Officer in the UK to the state retirement age of 68 years.

In July 2015, the POA endorsed Jeremy Corbyn's campaign in the Labour Party leadership election.

== National Chairmen ==
- 1939–1945: A J Rickard
- 1945–1948: J Beisty
- 1948–1949: A J Rickard
- 1949–1957: J E Lawrie
- 1957–1962: J Swainston
- 1962–1964: D J Vuller
- 1964–1968: N Cowling
- 1968–1976: S Powell
- 1976–1978: F W Money
- 1978–1980: P Waugh
- 1980–1986: C D Steel
- 1986–1995: John Bartell
- 1995–1997: John Boddington
- 1997–2001: Mark Healey
- 2001–2002: Andy Darken
- 2002–2011: Colin Moses
- 2011–2016 Pete McPartlin
- 2016–2017: Mike Rolfe
- 2017–present: Mark Fairhurst

== General Secretaries ==
- 1939–1963: Harley Cronin
- 1963–1972: Fred Castell
- 1972–1981: Ken Daniel
- 1981–2000: David Evans
- 2000–2010: Brian Caton
- 2010–present: Steve Gillan

== See also ==
- Law enforcement in the United Kingdom
