= List of shipwrecks in March 1820 =

The list of shipwrecks in March 1820 includes ships sunk, wrecked or otherwise lost during March 1820.

== 1 March ==
List of shipwrecks: 1 March 1820
Ship	State	Description
Isabella and Helen	United Kingdom	The ship was wrecked near Killala, County Mayo with the loss of all but one of her crew. She was on a voyage from Rothesay, Bute to Killala.
Thomas and Elizabeth	United Kingdom	The ship was driven ashore and sank at Hurst Castle, Hampshire. All on board were rescued. She was on a voyage from Plymouth, Devon, to Portsmouth, Hampshire.

== 2 March ==
List of shipwrecks: 2 March 1820
Ship	State	Description
Active	United Kingdom	The ship was wrecked at Burnham Overy Staithe, Norfolk with some loss of life. She was on a voyage from Newcastle upon Tyne, Northumberland, to Burnham Overy Staithe.
Active	United Kingdom	The ship was driven ashore and wrecked at Herne Bay, Kent. She was on a voyage from Seville, Spain, to London.
Active	United Kingdom	The ship, either a brig or a schooner, was driven ashore and wrecked at Herne Bay. She was on a voyage from Weymouth, Dorset, to London.
Active	United Kingdom	The ship was driven ashore near Ostend, West Flanders, Netherlands. She broke her back and was condemned.
Albertus Adrianus	Netherlands	The ship was driven ashore and wrecked at Southwold, Suffolk, United Kingdom. She was on a voyage from Rotterdam, South Holland, to Alnwick, Northumberland, United Kingdom.
Ann	United Kingdom	The ship was driven ashore near Calais, France. She was on a voyage from Waterford to London.
Ann	United Kingdom	The ship was driven ashore crewless at Birchington, Kent.
Betsey	United Kingdom	The ship was driven ashore at Scarborough, Yorkshire. Her crew were rescued.
Blessing	United Kingdom	The ship was driven ashore near Calais. She was on a voyage from Rouen, Seine-Inférieure, France to London.
Bocca Tigris	Netherlands	The ship was driven ashore at Blankenberge, West Flanders.
Boldon	United Kingdom	The ship was driven ashore at Sunderland, County Durham.
Bremezer	United Kingdom	The ship was driven ashore at Sheerness, Kent. Her crew were rescued. She was on a voyage from London to Chatham, Kent.
Celestine	France	The brig was driven ashore near Calais. Her seven crew survived. She was on a voyage from Havre de Grâce, Seine-Inférieure to Dunkerque, Nord. She was refloated on 17 March and taken in to Calais.
Ceres	United Kingdom	The Mersey flat foundered in the Irish Sea off Beaumaris, Anglesey.
Cygnet	United Kingdom	The ship foundered in the North Sea with the loss of all hands.
Deux Amis	France	The ship put in to Boulogne, Pas-de-Calai in a waterlogged condition and ra aground. She was on a voyage from Liverpool, Lacashire, United Kingdom to Ostend.
Diadem	United Kingdom	The ship was driven ashore at Bootle, Lancashire. She was on a voyage from Liverpool, Lancashire, to Virginia, United States. Diadem was refloated on 12 March.
Diligence	United Kingdom	The ship ran aground off the Kent coast. She was taken in to Portsmouth in a severely leaky condition.
Dorothea	United Kingdom	The brig was wrecked on the West Barrows Sand, in the North Sea off the coast of Kent with the loss of all hands. She was on a voyage from London to Hamburg.
Donnison	United Kingdom	The ship foundered in the North Sea with the loss of all hands.
Eliza	United Kingdom	The ship was driven ashore at Walton, Suffolk. She was on a voyage from Banff, Aberdeenshire, to London.
Eliza	United Kingdom	The ship foundered in the English Channel off Seaford, Sussex.
Eliza	United Kingdom	The brig was driven ashore and severely damaged between Calais and Gravelines. Her seven crew survived.
Elizabeth	United Kingdom	The ship was driven ashore at Great Yarmouth, Norfolk.
Elizabeth	United Kingdom	The brig was driven ashore and severely damaged near Calais with the loss of one of her ten crew. She was on a voyage from Sunderland, County Durham to Lisbon, Portugal.
Elizabeth	United Kingdom	The ship was driven ashore at Corton, Suffolk. She was refloated on 27 March and taken in to Great Yarmouth.
Endeavour	United Kingdom	The ship was driven ashore 3 nautical miles (5.6 km) from Whitstable, Kent. She was on a voyage from Belfast, County Antrim to London.
Endeavour	United Kingdom	The ship was driven ashore at Great Yarmouth.
Fisher	United Kingdom	The ship was driven ashore near Grimsby, Lincolnshire. She was on a voyage from London to Selby, Yorkshire.
Fleece	United Kingdom	The ship was driven ashore near Calais. She was on a voyage from Spithead, Hampshire, to Sunderland. Fleece was refloated on 22 April and taken in to Calais.
Flora	United Kingdom	The snow was wrecked on the Sunk Sand with the loss of four of her eleven crew.
Fly	United Kingdom	The brig was driven ashore near Calais. Her eight crew survived. She was on a voyage from Portsmouth to Sunderland.
Four Brothers	United Kingdom	The ship was driven ashore at Reculver, Kent. She was on a voyage from Arundel, Sussex, to London.
Free Briton	United Kingdom	The brig was driven ashore between Cap Gris Nez and Gravelines. Her nine crew survived.
Friends	United Kingdom	The ship was driven ashore at Pakefield, Suffolk.
Friends	United Kingdom	The ship was driven ashore and wrecked at Bridlington. She was on a voyage from Woodbridge, Suffolk, to Bridlington.
Friends	United Kingdom	The ship foundered in the North Sea with the loss of all hands.
Friendship	United Kingdom	The ship was driven ashore 3 nautical miles (5.6 km) from Whitstable.
Friendship	United Kingdom	The ship was wrecked on the Goodwin Sands with the loss of all hands. She was on a voyage from Newcastle upon Tyne to London.
Hannah	United Kingdom	The ship was wrecked on the Mouse Sand, in the North Sea off the coast of Kent. She was on a voyage from London to Berwick-upon-Tweed, Northumberland.
Harvest Home	United Kingdom	The Humber Keel was driven ashore and wrecked at Sheerness. Her crew were rescued. She was on a voyage from Great Yarmouth to London. Also reported as ashore at Milton Regis.
Henry & William	United Kingdom	The ship was driven ashore at Sunderland.
Hercule	France	The brig was driven ashore near Calais. Her eight crew survived. She was on a voyage from Rouen to London. Hercule was later refloated and taken in to Calais.
Iris	United Kingdom	The ship was driven ashore and severely damaged at Fort Rouge, Calais with the loss of two of her seven crew.
Jane	United Kingdom	The ship was driven ashore at Margate, Kent. She was on a voyage from Waterford to London. Jane was refloated on 15 March and taken in to Margate.
Jane	United Kingdom	The ship was driven ashore and wrecked at Sizewell, Suffolk. Her crew were rescued. She was on a voyage from London to South Shields.
Jane	United Kingdom	The ship was driven ashore at Great Yarmouth. She was on a voyage from Hull, Yorkshire, to Great Yarmouth.
Jason	United Kingdom	The ship was driven ashore at Handfleet, Suffolk. She was on a voyage from London to Boston, Lincolnshire.
Jeune Auguste	France	The dogger was driven ashore near Calais. Her six crew survived. She was on a voyage from Havre de Grâce, Seine-Inférieure to Rotterdam, South Holland, Netherlands. Jeune Auguste was refloated on 17 March and taken in to Calais.
John	United Kingdom	The ship was driven ashore at Handfleet, Suffolk. She was on a voyage from London to Sunderland. She was later refloated, repaired and returned to service.
John	United Kingdom	The ship was wrecked on the Goodwin Sands. Her crew were rescued by Diligence (United Kingdom).
John	United Kingdom	The ship was wrecked at Sutton Wash.
John and Adeline	United States	The ship was driven ashore and wrecked at Bermuda. Her crew were rescued.
Jones	United Kingdom	The ship capsized, was driven ashore and wrecked at Dover, Kent with the loss of all hands.
Jubilee	United Kingdom	The ship was driven ashore at Handfleet. She was on a voyage from London to York. Jubilee was later refloated and taken in to Harwich, Essex.
Kincardine	United Kingdom	The ship was driven ashore and wrecked at Great Yarmouth with the loss of four of her crew.
Korah	United Kingdom	The smack was wrecked on the Mouse Sand, in the North Sea off the coast of Kent. Her crew were rescued.
Latona	United Kingdom	The brig was driven ashore and wrecked at Hopton-on-Sea, Norfolk with the loss of four of her crew. She was on a voyage from Dundalk, County Louth, to London. Alos reported as wrecked at Corton, Suffolk with the loss of three of her crew.
Laurel	United Kingdom	The sloop was wrecked on the Grain Spit, in the Thames Estuary off the Isle of Grain, Kent. Her crew were rescued. She was on a voyage from London to Southwold.
Liberty	United Kingdom	The brig was driven ashore between Cap Gris Nez and Gravelines. Her four crew survived. Liberty was on a voyage from Southwold, Suffolk, to Newcastle upon Tyne, Northumberland. She was later refloated and taken in to Calais.
Lively	United Kingdom	The ship was driven ashore at Handfleet. She was on a voyage from Louth, Lincolnshire, to London. Lively was later refloated and taken in to Harwich.
Lord Duncan	United Kingdom	The ship was driven ashore and wrecked near Bridlington, Yorkshire.
Mantura	United Kingdom	The sloop was driven ashore and wrecked between Cap Gris Nez and Gravelines. Her five crew survived. She was on a voyage from São Miguel Island to London.
Mary	United Kingdom	The ship was driven ashore at "Handfleet". She was on a voyage from London to South Shields, County Durham.
Mary Ann	United Kingdom	The ship was driven ashore at Minster, Isle of Sheppey, Kent. Her crew were rescued.
Mentor, or Mentura	United Kingdom	The sloop was driven ashore and wrecked near Calais. Her five crew survived. She was on a voyage from São Miguel, Azores, Portugal to London.
Mexico	United States	The full-rigged ship was driven ashore near Calais. Her seventeen crew survived. She was on a voyage from Amsterdam, North Holland, Netherlands to St. Ubes, Portugal. Mexico was later refloated and taken in to Calais.
Minerva	United Kingdom	The ship was wrecked on the Goodwin Sands with the loss of all hands. She was on a voyage from Liverpool to London.
Minerva	United Kingdom	The ship foundered in the North Sea with the loss of all on board.
Mitten Hill	United Kingdom	The ship was driven ashore at Gorleston, Suffolk. She was on a voyage from London to Whitby, Yorkshire.
Nancy	United Kingdom	The schooner was driven ashore and wrecked near Calais with the loss of three of her eight crew. She was on a voyage from Leith, Lothian, to São Miguel.
Nancy	United Kingdom	The ship foundered in the English Channel off Boulogne, Pas-de-Calais, France.
Nancy	United Kingdom	The ship was wrecked on the Goodwin Sands.
Neptune	United Kingdom	The ship was driven ashore near Bridlington. She was refloated on 28 March and taken in to Whitby, Yorkshire.
Pandora	United Kingdom	The ship was driven ashore and wrecked at Hunstanton, Norfolk.
Perfect	United Kingdom	The ship was driven ashore at Aberdeen. She was on a voyage from Savannah, Georgia, United States to Aberdeen.
Prince Cobourg	United Kingdom	The steamship was driven ashore and wrecked at Minster, Isle of Sheppey, Kent. Her crew were rescued. She was on a voyage from Hull, Yorkshire, to Cowes, Isle of Wight.
Prince of Wales	United Kingdom	The schooner was driven ashore between Calais and Ostend. Her four crew survived. She was on a voyage from Sunderland to Portsmouth, Hampshire.
Providence	United Kingdom	The ship was driven ashore at Gorleston.
Ruby	United Kingdom	The ship was driven ashore and sank at Reculver. She was on a voyage from Cardiff, Glamorgan, to London.
Sally	United Kingdom	The ship, either a brig or a schooner, was driven ashore at Herne Bay. She was on a voyage from Caernarfon to London.
Sally	United Kingdom	The ship foundered in the North Sea. Her crew were rescued. She was on a voyage from Hull to Colchester, Essex.
Themistocles	France	The brig was driven ashore near Calais. Her eight crew survived. She was on a voyage from Bordeaux to Dunkerque. Themistocles was later refloated and taken in to Calais.
Thomas	United Kingdom	The brig was driven ashore near Calais. Her eight crew survived. She was on a voyage from Portsmouth to Sunderland. She was refloated on 17 March and taken in to Calais.
Three Brothers	(United Kingdom of Great Britain and Ireland) Jamaica	The drogher was driven ashore and wrecked on the east coast of Jamaica.
Toms	United Kingdom	The ship capsized and was driven ashore between Sheerness and Minster.
Union	France	The brig was driven ashore near Calais. Her nine crew survived.
Union	United Kingdom	The sloop was driven ashore and wrecked at Great Yarmouth, Norfolk. She was on a voyage from London to Spalding, Lincolnshire.
Venus	United Kingdom	The ship was driven ashore near Dunkerque. She was on a voyage from Rye, Sussex, to Newcastle upon Tyne. Venus was refloated on 18 March and taken in to Dunkerque.
Vigilance	France	The ship was driven ashore near Ostend.
Vigilant	United Kingdom	The ship was driven ashore at Margate, Kent. She was on a voyage from Portsmouth, Hampshire, to London.
Vrede	Netherlands	The ship was driven onto the Kaloot Bank, in the North Sea off Vlissingen, Zeeland. She was on a voyage from Batavia, Netherlands East Indies, to Dordrecht, South Holland.
Wilhelmus and Jeanne	Netherlands	The ship was driven ashore at Abergele, Caernarvonshire, United Kingdom. Her crew were rescued. She was on a voyage from Antwerp to Liverpool.
Unnamed	United Kingdom	The brig foundered off King's Lynn with the loss of all hands.
Two unnamed vessels	United Kingdom	The lighters sank at Sheerness with the loss of four lives.
Unnamed	United Kingdom	The brig sank at the Nore. Two of her crew were rescued.
Unnamed	United Kingdom	The brig was wrecked on the Middle Sand, in the North Sea off the coast of Essex with the loss of all hands.
Unnamed	United Kingdom	The sloop sank off the Middle Sand.
Three unnamed vessels	Flags unknow	The ships foundered off the north Kent coast.

== 3 March ==
List of shipwrecks: 3 March 1820
Ship	State	Description
Active	United Kingdom	The ship was driven ashore and wrecked at Wells-next-the-Sea, Norfolk. She was on a voyage from Berwick upon Tweed, Northumberland to London.
Active	United Kingdom	The ship was driven ashore and wrecked at Blankenberge, West Flanders, Netherlands.
Active	United Kingdom	The ship was wrecked at Burnham Overy Staithe, Norfolk with some loss of life. She was on a voyage from Newcastle upon Tyne, Northumbeland to Burnham Overy Staithe.
Alfred	United Kingdom	The ship capsized in the Great Ouse near King's Lynn, Norfolk.
Alliance	United Kingdom	The ship sank at King's Lynn.
Ann	United Kingdom	The ship was driven ashore in the Great Ouse at King's Lynn.
Anna Gesina	Netherlands	The ship was driven ashore and wrecked at Egmond aan Zee, North Holland. She was on a voyage from Newcastle upon Tyne, Northumberland, United Kingdom to Amsterdam, North Holland.
Blessing	United Kingdom	The ship was driven ashore between Calais, France, and Ostend, Netherlands.
Bloming	United Kingdom	The ship was driven ashore between Calais and Ostend.
Cepheus	United Kingdom	The collier was driven ashore at Sandhale, between Grimsby and Trusthorpe, Lincolnshire. Her crew were rescued.
Collins	United Kingdom	The ship was driven ashore between Grimsby and Trusthorpe.
Commerce	United Kingdom	The ship was driven ashore and wrecked at Hunstanton, Norfolk with the loss of a crew member.
Deux Frères	United Kingdom	The ship was driven ashore near Quillebeuf-sur-Seine, Seine-Inférieure.
Dione	United Kingdom	The ship was driven ashore in the Great Ouse at King's Lynn.
Dove	United Kingdom	The ship ran aground at Saint-Valery-en-Caux, Seine-Inférieure, France. She was on a voyage from Falmouth, Cornwall, to Stangate Creek, Kent.
xxxx	United Kingdom	The ship .
Economy	United Kingdom	The ship was wrecked on the Goodwin Sands, Kent. Her crew were rescued. She was on a voyage from Newcastle upon Tyne to London.
Eliza	United Kingdom	The ship was driven ashore and wrecked near Calais.
Elizabeth	United Kingdom	The brig was driven ashore and severely damaged between Calais and Gravelines, Nord, France with the loss of one of her nine crew. She was on a voyage from Sunderland, County Durham to Lisbon, Portugal.
Endeavour	United Kingdom	The ship was driven ashore and wrecked at Sandhale.
Fleece	United Kingdom	The ship was driven ashore between Calais and Ostend. She was on a voyage from Spithead, Hampshire, to Sunderland.
Flora	United Kingdom	The snow was wrecked on the Goodwin Sands with the loss of four of her eleven crew. She was on a voyage from South Shields to London.
Fly	United Kingdom	The brig was driven ashore between Cap Gris Nez, Pas-de-Calais and Gravelines. Her eight crew survived. She was on a voyage from Portsmouth to Sunderland.
Fortitude	United Kingdom	The ship foundered.
Four Brothers and Sisters	United Kingdom	The ship was driven ashore on Point Hourdel, Somme, France. She later put into the River Somme.
Fox	United Kingdom	The smack was driven ashore between Grimsby and Trusthorpe. She was on a voyage from Aberdeen to Hull, Yorkshire.
Friends	United Kingdom	The ship was driven ashore on the Norfolk coast. Her crew were rescued.
Friends of Yarmouth	United Kingdom	The ship was driven ashore at Pakefield, Suffolk.
Friendship	United Kingdom	The ship was wrecked on the Goodwin Sands. Her crew were rescued. She was on a voyage from Sunderland, County Durham to Hastings, Sussex.
Friend's Increase	United Kingdom	The ship was driven ashore on the Norfolk coast. Her crew were rescued.
Garland	United Kingdom	The collier was driven ashore at Sandhale, between Grimsby and Trusthorpe. Her crew were rescued. She was refloated on 16 March and taken in to Grimsby.
Henry and William	United Kingdom	The brig was driven ashore at Sunderland. She was refloated on 6 March.
Hester	United Kingdom	The ship sank at King's Lynn.
Icis	France	The ship ws driven ashore between Calais and Gravelines.
Industry	United Kingdom	The ship was driven ashore and wrecked between Grimsby and Trusthorpe with the loss of a crew member.
Isis	United Kingdom	The brig was driven ashore and severely damaged between Calais and Gravelines with the loss of two of her five crew.
Jane	United Kingdom	The ship ran aground at Margate, She was on a voyage from Waterford to London.
Jane and Margaret	United Kingdom	The ship was driven ashore at Aberystwyth, Cardiganshire. She was on a voyage from Limerick to Liverpool, Lancashire. Jane and Margaret was later refloated and taken in to Aberdovey, Merionethshire.
Janet	United Kingdom	The ship was driven ashore between Grimsby and Trusthorpe.
John	United Kingdom	The ship was driven ashore in the Great Ouse at King's Lynn. She was later refloated and repaired.
John	United Kingdom	The ship was lost at Sutton Wash, Lincolnshire. She was later refloated and placed under repair.
John and Dorothy	United Kingdom	The ship was wrecked off Dieppe, Seine-Inférieure, France. Her crew were rescued. She was on a voyage from South Shields to Saint-Valery-sur-Somme, Somme, France.
John and Mary	United Kingdom	The sloop sprang a leak and was beached at Fishguard, Pembrokeshire, where she was subsequently wrecked.
John Gifford	United Kingdom	The ship sank at Great Yarmouth.
Latona	United Kingdom	The ship was wrecked on the Corton Sand, in the North Sea off Corton, Suffolk. Her crew were rescued. She was on a voyage from Dundalk, County Louth, to London.
Lavinia	United Kingdom	The collier was driven ashore at Sandhale, between Grimsby and Trusthorpe. Her crew were rescued.
Leeds	United Kingdom	The ship was driven ashore and wrecked at Wainfleet, Lincolnshire with the loss of all hands. She was on a voyage from London to Leeds, Yorkshire.
Liberty	United Kingdom	The ship was driven ashore and wrecked near Calais.
London	United Kingdom	The brig was wrecked on the Shipwash Sand, in the North Sea off the coast of Suffolk. Her six crew were rescued by James (United Kingdom).
Louisa	United Kingdom	The ship was driven ashore near Faversham, Kent.
Lucy and Mary	United Kingdom	The ship was driven ashore on the Norfolk coast. Her crew were rescued.
Mantura	United Kingdom	The ship was driven ashore between Calais and Ostend.
Marshland	United Kingdom	The ship was driven ashore and wrecked on the Norfolk coast. Her crew were rescued.
Minerva	United Kingdom	The ship was wrecked on the Goodwin Sands with the loss of all hands.
Nancy	United Kingdom	The schooner was driven ashore and wrecked between Calais and Gravelines with the loss of three of her five crew. She was on a voyage from Leith, Lothian, to São Miguel Island Azores.
Neptune	United Kingdom	The schooner was driven ashore near Bridlington, Yorkshire. She was refloated in late March and taken in to Whitby, Yorkshire.
Nossa Senhora de Victoria	Portugal	The ship was driven ashore near Caen, Calvados, France. She was on a voyage from Havre de Grâce to Oporto.
Olive Branch	United Kingdom	The ship was driven ashore near The Needles, Isle of Wight. She was on a voyage from Looe, Cornwall, to Arundel, Sussex. Olive Branch was later refloated and taken in to Cowes, Isle of Wight.
Paix	Netherlands	The ship was wrecked on the Calvet Bank, in the North Sea. Her crew were rescued. She was on a voyage from Batavia, Netherlands East Indies, to Dordrecht, South Holland.
Queen Charlotte	United Kingdom	The ship was driven ashore and wrecked at Trusthorpe. She was on a voyage from Norfolk to West Stockwith, Nottinghamshire.
Redbreast	United Kingdom	The brig was driven ashore at Wells-next-the-Sea, Norfolk. Her crew were rescued. She was later refloated and taken in to Wells-next-the-Sea.
Rosamund	United Kingdom	The collier was driven ashore at Sandhale, between Grimsby and Trusthorpe. Her crew were rescued. She was later refloated and put into Hull.
Ruby	United Kingdom	The ship foundered in the North Sea off Reculver, Kent. Her crew were rescued.
Sally	United Kingdom	The ship was wrecked on the Brest Sand, in The Wash.
Sally	United Kingdom	The ship foundered in the English Channel off Boulogne-sur-Mer, Pas-de-Calais, France.
Samuel Whitbread	United Kingdom	The ship was lost near King's Lynn with the loss of her captain. She was on a voyage from Lerwick, Shetland Islands, to London.
Sophia	United Kingdom	The brig foundered in the English Channel off Dover.
Staines	United Kingdom	The ship was driven ashore and wrecked at Terrington Marsh, Norfolk.
Success	United Kingdom	The ship was wrecked on the Herd Sand.
Supply	United Kingdom	The ship was driven ashore on the Norfolk coast. Her crew were rescued.
Susannah	United Kingdom	The ship was driven ashore on the Norfolk coast. Her crew were rescued.
Thistle	United Kingdom	The ship capsized in the North Sea off Sutton Wash. Her crew were rescued by John and Mary (both United Kingdom).
Thomas	United Kingdom	The ship was driven ashore between Calais and Ostend. She was on a voyage from Portsmouth to Sunderland. Thomas was refloated on 17 March and taken in to Calais.
Triton	United Kingdom	The ship was driven ashore between Grimsby and Trusthorpe. She was refloated on 1 April and taken in to Hull for repairs.
True Briton	United Kingdom	The ship was driven ashore and wrecked near Calais.
True Friends	United Kingdom	The ship was driven ashore in the Great Ouse at King's Lynn.
Vigilance	France	The ship was driven ashore at Ostend.
Vode	United Kingdom	The sloop was driven ashore and wrecked at Saint-Valery-en-Caux. Her seven crew were rescued
Vrienden, or Vriendschap	Netherlands	The ship was driven ashore between Grimsby and Trusthorpe with the loss of three lives. She was on a voyage from Ostend, West Flanders, to Hull.
Woodford	United Kingdom	The ship was driven ashore and wrecked at Lowestoft.
Wren	United Kingdom	The ship was driven ashore in the Great Ouse at King's Lynn.
Young	United Kingdom	The ship was driven ashore between Grimsby and Cleethorpes.
63 unnamed vessels	Flags unknown	The ships were driven ashore and wrecked between Calais and Étaples, Pas-de-Calais.
Unnamed	United Kingdom	The sloop foundered off Eyemouth, Berwickshire with the loss of all hands.
Unnamed	United Kingdom	The sloop foundered off Wells-next-the-Sea with the loss of all hands.
Unnamed	United Kingdom	The sloop sank off Tynemouth Castle, Northumberland.
Unnamed	United Kingdom	The sloop foundered off Great Orme Head, Caernarfonshire.
Unnamed	United Kingdom	The sloop was wrecked on the Holderness coast, Yorkshire with the loss of all hands.

== 4 March ==
List of shipwrecks: 4 March 1820
Ship	State	Description
Anna	United Kingdom	The ship was driven ashore at Herne Bay, Kent. She was on a voyage from London to Poole, Dorset.
Celerity	United Kingdom	The ship was driven ashore and wrecked at King's Lynn, Norfolk with the loss of three lives.
Commerce	United Kingdom	The ship was driven ashore in Alum Bay, Isle of Wight. She was on a voyage from Cork to Southampton, Hampshire. Commerce was later refloated and taken in to Cowes, Isle of Wight.
Dove	United Kingdom	The sloop was driven ashore at Dieppe, Seine-Inférieure, France. Her seven crew were rescued.
Vrais Amis	France	The ship was lost off Ostend, Netherlands. She was on a voyage from Marennes, Charente-Maritime to Ostend.
Unamed	United Kingdom	The sloop sank at King's Lynn with the loss of her captain.
Unnamed	United Kingdom	The brig ran aground at Aberdovey, Merionethshire.

== 5 March ==
List of shipwrecks: 5 March 1820
Ship	State	Description
Ann	United Kingdom	The ship was wrecked on the Gunfleet Sand, in the North Sea off the coast of Essex. Her crew were rescued. She was on a voyage from London to South Shields, County Durham.
Happy Return	United Kingdom	The ship was driven ashore near St Albans Head, Dorset. She was on a voyage from Waterford to London. Happy Return was refloated and taken in to Weymouth, Dorset on 6 March.
Spring	United Kingdom	The ship was wrecked on the Mouse Sand, in the North Sea off the coast of Kent. Her crew were rescued. She was on a voyage from Aberdeen to London.
Zephyr	Bremen	The ship ran aground off the Île de Batz, Finistère, France. She was on a voyage from Bordeaux, Gironde, France to Bremen.

== 6 March ==
List of shipwrecks: 6 March 1820
Ship	State	Description
Margaret	United Kingdom	The ship ran aground on the Nore. She was on a voyage from London to Sunderland, County Durham. She was refloated and put in to Sheerness, Kent.
"Quaker"	United States	The U. S. Navy chartered schooner sank in a gale, lost with all 41 hands.

== 7 March ==
List of shipwrecks: 7 March 1820
Ship	State	Description
Enigkeit	Prussia	The ship was driven ashore on Møn, Denmark. She was on a voyage from Königsburg to Hull, Yorkshire, United Kingdom.
Grampion	United Kingdom	The ship ran aground at Sunderland, County Durham. She was on a voyage from Sunderland to Aberdeen. She was refloated and resumed her voyage, but consequently put in to North Shields, Northumberland in a leaky condition.

=== 8 March ===
List of shipwrecks: 8 March 1820
Ship	State	Description
Recovery	United Kingdom	The ship foundered in the English Channel off Beachy Head, Sussex.
Victoria	(Russian Empire) Grand Duchy of Finland	The ship ran aground on the Long Sand, in the North Sea off the coast of Essex, United Kingdom. She was on a voyage from Jakobstad to Lisbon, Portugal. Victoria was subsequently refloated with the assistance of five salvage smacks and taken in to Harwich, Essex.

== 9 March ==
List of shipwrecks: 9 March 1820
Ship	State	Description
Indian Hunter	United Kingdom	The ship was driven ashore and wrecked at St. Ubes, Portugal.

== 11 March ==
List of shipwrecks: 11 March 1820
Ship	State	Description
Robert & Christian	United Kingdom	The ship struck a rock off Campbeltown, Argyllshire and was abandoned. She subsequently came ashore on Isla Ross and was wrecked. Robert & Christian was on a voyage from Ulverston, Lancashire, to Oban, Argyllshire.
Success	United Kingdom	The ship was driven ashore on Sicily, Kingdom of the Two Sicilies. She was on a voyage from Gallipoli, Ottoman Empire to Saint Petersburgh, Russia. She was refloated and resumed her voyage.

== 12 March ==
List of shipwrecks: 12 March 1820
Ship	State	Description
Blaydes	United Kingdom	The ship was wrecked on the Stoney Binks, in the North Sea off the mouth of the Humber with the loss of two of her crew. She was on a voyage from South Shields, County Durham, to London.
Ville de Caen	France	The ship was wrecked at Cape Barfleur, Manche. Her crew were rescued. She was on a voyage from Guadeloupe to Caen, Calvados.

== 13 March ==
List of shipwrecks: 13 March 1820
Ship	State	Description
Antoinet	Portugal	The ship was driven ashore and wrecked at Rio de Janeiro, Brazil.

== 14 March ==
List of shipwrecks: 14 March 1820
Ship	State	Description
Amity	United Kingdom	The ship was driven ashore at Flamborough Head, Yorkshire. She was later refloated.
Brothers	United Kingdom	The ship was lost in the English Channel off Newhaven, Sussex.
Malvina	United Kingdom	The ship was driven ashore at Flamborough Head. She was later refloated.
Star of North Shields	United Kingdom	The ship was driven ashore at Flamborough Head. She was later refloated.
William	United Kingdom	The ship was driven ashore at Flamborough Head. She was later refloated.

== 15 March ==
List of shipwrecks: 15 March 1820
Ship	State	Description
Integrity	United Kingdom	The ship was driven ashore at Liverpool, Lancashire.

== 16 March ==
List of shipwrecks: 16 March 1820
Ship	State	Description
Argus	United Kingdom	The ship was wrecked on Anegada. She was on a voyage from London to Jamaica and Cuba.
Islington	United States	The full-rigged ship was wrecked at Cape Hatteras, North Carolina. All on board survived.
Unnamed	Spain	The ship capsized off Europa Point, Gibraltar. Her crew were rescued.

== 18 March ==
List of shipwrecks: 18 March 1820
Ship	State	Description
Albion	United Kingdom	The ship was driven ashore at Wells-next-the-Sea, Norfolk. Her crew were rescued. She was on a voyage from Newcastle upon Tyne, Northumberland, to London. Albion was later refloated and taken in to Wells-next-the-Sea.
Ariel	United Kingdom	The ship foundered in the Persian Gulf with the loss of 79 lives.
Diana	United Kingdom	The ship was wrecked on the Goodwin Sands, Kent. Her crew were rescued. She was on a voyage from Sunderland, County Durham to Portsmouth, Hampshire.
Flora	United States	The schooner sprang a leak and was abandoned in the Atlantic Ocean (2°23′S 36°30′W). Her crew were rescued by Eliza (United Kingdom). Flora was on a voyage from Pernambuco, United Kingdom of Portugal, Brazil and the Algarves, to "Margaretta".
Redman	United Kingdom	The ship was driven ashore near Dungeness, Kent. She was on a voyage from London to Madeira. She was refloated and put in to Portsmouth, Hampshire for repairs.

== 20 March ==
List of shipwrecks: 20 March 1820
Ship	State	Description
Belle Isle	United Kingdom	The ship was wrecked on the Columbine Rock, 5 leagues (15 nautical miles (28 km) north east of Trinidad. Her crew were rescued. She was on a voyage from Berbice to Glasgow, Renfrewshire.
Mary	(United Kingdom of Great Britain and Ireland) British Guiana	The ship was driven ashore at Vila Nova de Portimão, Portugal. Her crew were rescued. She was on a voyage from Madeira to a Portuguese port.

== 24 March ==
List of shipwrecks: 24 March 1820
Ship	State	Description
Ann	United Kingdom	The ship was driven ashore at Winterton-on-Sea, Norfolk. She was on a voyage from Selby, Yorkshire, to Sheerness, Kent.

== 25 March ==
List of shipwrecks: 25 March 1820
Ship	State	Description
Betsey	United Kingdom	The ship was driven ashore and wrecked at Brighton, Sussex. Her crew were rescued.
Fame	United Kingdom	The ship ran aground at Demerara.
Juno	United Kingdom	The ship ran aground on the Herd Sand, in the North Sea off the coast of County Durham. She was on a voyage from Montrose, Forfarshire to Newcastle upon Tyne, Northumberland.
Twee Gebroder	Netherlands	The ship was driven ashore on Ameland, Friesland. She was on a voyage from a port in the Duchy of Holstein to Zaandam or Amsterdam, North Holland.

== 26 March ==
List of shipwrecks: 26 March 1820
Ship	State	Description
Betsey	United Kingdom	The ship was driven ashore at Brighton, Sussex, where she subsequently broke up.
Hercules	Flag unknown	The ship ran aground on the Goodwin Sands, Kent. She was on a voyage from Alicante, Spain to Gothenburg, Sweden. She was refloated with assistance the next day.
Lark	United Kingdom	The ship sprang a leak and foundered in the English Channel off Dover, Kent. Her crew were rescued. She was on a voyage from Rye, Sussex, to Chatham, Kent.

== 27 March ==
List of shipwrecks: 27 March 1820
Ship	State	Description
Albion	United States	The ship was driven ashore and wrecked on the Burrow of Ballyteague, County Clare, United Kingdom. Her crew were rescued. She was on a voyage from Charleston, South Carolina to Liverpool, Lancashire, United Kingdom.
Bayard	United States	The ship was driven ashore and wrecked in Chale Bay, Isle of Wight, United Kingdom.

== 29 March ==
List of shipwrecks: 29 March 1820
Ship	State	Description
Anna Margaretha	Hamburg	The ship was driven ashore on Eierland, North Holland, Netherlands. She was on a voyage from New York, United States, to Hamburg. Anna Margaretha was later refloated.

== 31 March ==
List of shipwrecks: 31 March 1820
Ship	State	Description
Eclipse	United Kingdom	The ship departed from King's Lynn, Norfolk for Quebec City, Lower Canada, British North America. No further trace, presumed foundered with the loss of all hands.
Hind	United Kingdom	The ship ran aground on the Rattray Brigs, off the coast of Aberdeenshire. She was on a voyage from Dundee, Forfarshire to New York. She was refloated and put in to Fraserburgh, for repairs.
Moreland	United Kingdom	The ship was destroyed by fire at Kingston, Jamaica.

== Unknown date ==
List of shipwrecks: Unknown date in March 1820
Ship	State	Description
Agile	France	The ship struck rocks and was wrecked at Le Conquet, Finistère.
Ariadne	Bremen	The galiot was driven ashore and wrecked near Penzance, Cornwall, United Kingdom. She was on a voyage from Bordeaux, Gironde, France to Bremen.
Bee	United Kingdom	The ship ran aground. She was on a voyage from King's Lynn, Norfolk to London. She waws refloated and put back to King's Lynn.
Berkeley Castle	United Kingdom	The ship was driven ashore near St Albans Head, Dorset in early March. She was on a voyage from Aberthaw, Glamorgan, to London. Berkeley Castle was later refloated and taken in to Weymouth, Dorset.
Cygnet	United Kingdom	The ship foundered in the English Channel off Beachy Head, Sussex on or before 17 March.
Dorothy	United Kingdom	The ship was lost on the West Burrows Sand, in the North Sea, with the loss of all hands. She was on a voyage from London to Hamburg.
Eliza	United Kingdom	The ship foundered in the English Channel off Brighton, Sussex on or before 16 March.
Harriet	United Kingdom	The sloop was driven ashore and wrecked in Yallah's Bay, Jamaica in early March.
Hector	France	The ship was wrecked near St.Andero, Spain. She was on a voyage from Bayonne, Pyrenées-Atlantiques to Guadeloupe.
Hopewell	United Kingdom	The ship was driven ashore at Shellness, Kent in early March.
John & Mary	United Kingdom	The ship was driven ashore at Fishguard, Pembrokeshire in early March. She was on a voyage from Chester, Cheshire, to Llanelli, Glamorgan. John & Mary was refloated on 14 March and taken in to Fishguard.
London	United Kingdom	The ship foundered in the English Channel off Littlehampton, Sussex on or before 14 March.
Margaret	United Kingdom	The ship was wrecked on Grand Cayman Island. She was on a voyage from Jamaica to Quebec, British North America.
Minerva	United Kingdom	The ship foundered in the English Channel between Beachy Head and Fairleigh, Sussex on or before 13 March.
Nereid	France	The ship was lost at the mouth of the Garonne.
Palmers	United Kingdom	The ship foundered at Madras, India between 28 and 31 March. Her crew were rescued.
Phoenix	United Kingdom	The ship was driven ashore and wrecked at Walton-on-the-Naze, Essex.
Princess Charlotte	United Kingdom	The smack was run down and sunk by Dundee (United Kingdom) in the North Sea off the Gunfleet Sand.
Quatre Sœurs	France	The ship was wrecked at La Tremblade, Charente-Maritime with the loss of all but two of her crew. She was on a voyage from London to Bordeaux.
Recovery	United Kingdom	The ship foundered in the English Channel off Beachy Head on or before 8 March.
Rinchania	Kingdom of Sardinia	The ship foundered off Sardinia. Her crew were rescued. She was on a voyage from Marseille, Bouches-du-Rhône to Sète, Hérault, France.
Sea Nymph	United Kingdom	The brig was lost on the Long Sand, in the North Sea.
Thomas and Elizabeth	United Kingdom	The smack was driven ashore and wrecked at Portsmouth, Hampshire.
