= Bay View, Kent =

Hamlet in Kent, England

Coordinates: 51.4°N 0.90667°E

Bay View
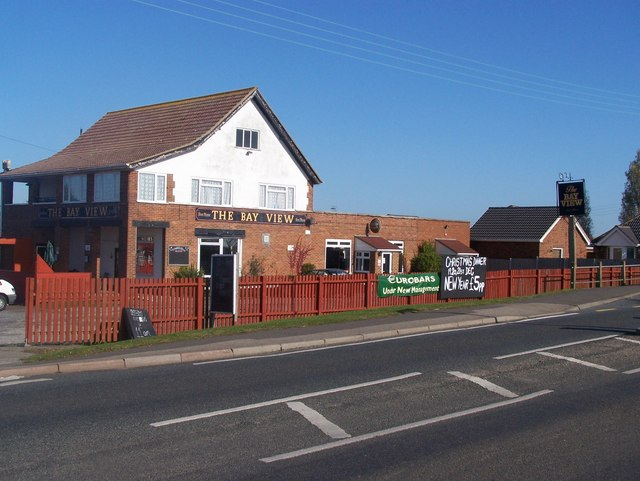
- The Bay View pub

- Location within Kent
- Area: 0.2150 km^{2} (0.0830 sq mi)
- Population: 699 (2020 estimate)
  - Density: 3,251/km^{2} (8,420/sq mi)
- Civil parish: Leysdown
- District: Swale
- Shire county: Kent
- Region: South East
- Country: England
- Sovereign state: United Kingdom
- Post town: Sheerness
- Postcode district: ME12
- Dialling code: 01795
- Police: Kent
- Fire: Kent
- Ambulance: South East Coast
- UK Parliament: Sittingbourne and Sheppey

Bay View is a hamlet in the civil parish of Leysdown, on the east side of the Isle of Sheppey in the borough of Swale in Kent, England. In 2020 it had an estimated population of 699.

== History ==
Bay View is a development of houses started in the 1940s and since then has grown to 248 dwellings.

== Geography ==
Eastchurch is located two miles away to the ENE and Leysdown-on-Sea is a mile to the east. Warden is a mile to the north and Leysdown Marshes lie to the south.

== Economy ==
There is a holiday park in Bay View and a pub, the Bay View. There is also a garage which sells caravans and miscellaneous supplies. Formerly there were two general stores, but one closed in the 1980s due to a lack of trade. The same fate led to the closure of the Bay View Stores in 2004.

51% of the population travels more than 10 km to work, with 72% of workers travelling by car.

== Transport ==
The B2231 road runs along the southern edge of Bay View and provides the only transport link. Buses run every half-hour or hour to the rest of the Isle and services to the mainland are also available.

== Education ==
Bay View has no education facilities, with the nearest school being two miles away in Eastchurch.

== See also ==
http://www.swale.gov.uk/media/adobepdf/b%2Fd%2FWR_SBC_136.pdf%5B%5D - Statistics and information regarding Bay View from Swale Borough Council.
