= List of shipwrecks in January 1823 =

The list of shipwrecks in January 1823 includes ships sunk, foundered, grounded, or otherwise lost during January 1823.

== 1 January ==
List of shipwrecks: 1 January 1823
Ship	State	Description
Harriet	United Kingdom	The ship was driven ashore at Waterford. She was on a voyage from Saint John, New Brunswick, British North America, to Liverpool, Lancashire. She was refloated on 20 January and taken in to Waterford.
Hero	United Kingdom	The ship was driven onto a reef in Hoy Sound and was wrecked. Her crew were rescued. She was on a voyage from Memel, Prussia, to Grangemouth, Stirlingshire.
Kammerheere Rosencrantz	Denmark	The ship ran aground at Penzance, Cornwall, United Kingdom. She was on a voyage from Copenhagen to Africa.
Mary	United Kingdom	The sloop capsized in the English Channel off Dodman Point, Cornwall. The wreck was driven ashore with the loss of all hands. She was on a voyage from Plymouth, Devon, to Falmouth, Cornwall.
Nereus	United States	The ship was wrecked at Cape Hatteras, Virginia. She was on a voyage from Bremen to Baltimore, Maryland.
Prince Regent	United Kingdom	The brig sprung a leak and was abandoned in the Atlantic Ocean. Three of her eight crew reached Trafaria, Portugal, on 6 January. She was on a voyage from Hull to Buenos Aires, Argentina.
Regent	United Kingdom	The brig was wrecked on São Miguel Island, Azores, Portugal, Her crew were rescued.
Weare	United Kingdom	The ship foundered in the Irish Sea off Ballycotton, County Cork, with the loss of 25 of the 38 people on board. She was on a voyage from Bristol, Gloucestershire, to Jamaica.

== 2 January ==
List of shipwrecks: 2 January 1823
Ship	State	Description
Eliza and Ann	United Kingdom	The ship sank at Newcastle upon Tyne, Northumberland. She was later refloated.
Gaivotee	United Kingdom	The smack was wrecked at Madeira. Her crew were rescued.
Louisa Cecilia	United States	The ship was wrecked at Madeira. Her crew were rescued.
Mary	United Kingdom	The ship was driven ashore and wrecked 7 nautical miles (13 km) west of Dunbar, Lothian. Her crew were rescued.
Selsker	United Kingdom	The ship was wrecked on North Uist, Outer Hebrides. Her crew were rescued. She was on a voyage from Lisbon, Portugal, to Portsmouth, Hampshire or Dublin.

== 3 January ==
List of shipwrecks: 3 January 1823
Ship	State	Description
Hope	United Kingdom	The ship was driven ashore at Orford, Suffolk. Her crew were rescued.

== 4 January ==
List of shipwrecks: 4 January 1823
Ship	State	Description
Cecelia	United States	The ship foundered west of Curaçao. She was on a voyage from Curaçao to Gibraltar.
Flora	(United Kingdom of Great Britain and Ireland) British North America	The ship was driven ashore and damaged at Waterford, United Kingdom. All on board were rescued. She was on a voyage from Quebec City, Lower Canada, to Liverpool, Lancashire, United Kingdom. Flora was later refloated.
Jason	United States	The ship was driven ashore and wrecked on Long Island, New York. Her crew were rescued. She was on a voyage from Cuba to New York City.
Wackzamkeit	Hamburg	The ship foundered in the North Sea off Bergen, Norway. Her crew were rescued. She was on a voyage from Hamburg to Seville, Spain.

== 5 January ==
List of shipwrecks: 5 January 1823
Ship	State	Description
Betsey	United Kingdom	The brig struck a rock and was wrecked at Crail, Fife. Her seven crew were rescued. She was on a voyage from Stockholm, Sweden, to London.
Eliza	United Kingdom	The ship was wrecked on the Gunfleet Sand, in the North Sea off Harwich, Essex. Her crew were rescued. She was on a voyage from North Shields, County Durham, to Rochester, Kent.
Hertford	United Kingdom	The ship was wrecked on the Gunfleet Sand. Her crew were rescued. She was on a voyage from North Shields to London.

== 6 January ==
List of shipwrecks: 6 January 1823
Ship	State	Description
Æolus or Eolus	Russia	The ship was driven ashore and wrecked at Garron Point, Stonehaven, Aberdeenshire, with the loss of a crew member. She was on a voyage from Gamla Karleby, Sweden, to Lisbon, Portugal
Elizabeth	United Kingdom	The ship was driven ashore and wrecked on the coast of Aberdeenshire with the loss of all hands.
Nova Victoria	Portugal	The ship was driven ashore and wrecked at Lisbon with the loss of six of her crew. She was on a voyage from Maranhão, Brazil, to Lisbon.

== 7 January ==
List of shipwrecks: 7 January 1823
Ship	State	Description
Lark	United Kingdom	The ship struck a rock at Malta and was beached. She was on a voyage from London to Malta.
Otho	United Kingdom	The ship departed from Liverpool, Lancashire, for New York. No further trace, presumed foundered with the loss of all hands.
HMRC Prince Regent	Board of Customs	The cutter was driven ashore at Bervie, Aberdeenshire.

== 8 January ==
List of shipwrecks: 8 January 1823
Ship	State	Description
Earl of Surrey	United Kingdom	The ship was driven ashore in Ballyteague Bay. She was on a voyage from São Miguel Island, Azores to the Isle of Man.
Windermere	United Kingdom	The ship capsized in the Atlantic Ocean with the loss of nine of her 23 crew. Three more crew died before the survivors were rescued on 10 January by Venus ( (United Kingdom of Great Britain and Ireland) Jersey), although two of them died during the rescue. Windermere was on a voyage from Old Calabar, Nigeria, to Liverpool, Lancashire.

== 9 January ==
List of shipwrecks: 9 January 1823
Ship	State	Description
Banon	United Kingdom	The ship was wrecked on Priestholm, Anglesey. Her crew were rescued. She was on a voyage from Liverpool, Lancashire, to Dublin.
Friendship	United Kingdom	The ship was driven ashore at Sheerness, Kent.
Yarmouth	United Kingdom	The ship was lost off "Boncas, Cape Salen", Spanish Main. Her crew were rescued. She was on a voyage from Campeche, Mexico, to London.

== 10 January ==
List of shipwrecks: 10 January 1823
Ship	State	Description
Mount Pleasant	United States	The brig departed from Charleston, South Carolina, for Saint-Valery-sur-Somme, Somme, France. No further trace, presumed foundered in the Atlantic Ocean with the loss of all hands.
Seaflower	United States	The ship was lost near Cape Henry, Virginia. Her crew were rescued.

== 11 January ==
List of shipwrecks: 11 January 1823
Ship	State	Description
Despatch	United Kingdom	The ship struck a rock and sank in Galway Bay. She was on a voyage from Riga, Russia, to Galway. Despatch was later refloated.
Sea Nymph	United Kingdom	The ship was driven ashore and wrecked at Orford, Suffolk. Her crew were rescued. She was on a voyage from London to South Shields, County Durham.
Susan	United States	The ship sprang a leak and became waterlogged whilst on a voyage from Portland, Oregon, to Havana, Cuba. Three survivors were taken off the wreck on 26 January by Bee ( (United Kingdom of Great Britain and Ireland) British North America).

== 13 January ==
List of shipwrecks: 13 January 1823
Ship	State	Description
Gezina van Veendam	Netherlands	The ship foundered off the Norwegian coast. Her crew were rescued. She was on a voyage from Amsterdam, North Holland, to Elbing.
La Française Rosé	France	The ship was driven ashore in Start Bay and wrecked.

== 14 January ==
List of shipwrecks: 14 January 1823
Ship	State	Description
Apollo	United Kingdom	The ship was wrecked on the Eddystone Rocks, in the English Channel. She was on a voyage from the Charente to London.
Better Luck Still	United Kingdom	The ship ran aground on the Herd Sand, in the North Sea. She was refloated but collided with another vessel and was severely damaged. Better Luck Still put back to Newcastle upon Tyne, Northumberland.
Britannia	United Kingdom	The ship was driven ashore near Gallipoli, Ottoman Empire. She was on a voyage from Constantinople to Bristol, Gloucestershire. She was refloated in late January or early February and sailed for the Dardanelles.
Edward	United Kingdom	The smack was driven ashore and wrecked at Falmouth, Cornwall. She was on a voyage from Portsmouth, Hampshire, to Falmouth.
Gezina van Veendam	Netherlands	The ship foundered off the coast of Norway. Her crew were rescued. She was on a voyage from Elbing to Amsterdam, North Holland.
Herald	United States	The sloop was driven ashore at South Uist, Outer Hebrides, United Kingdom.
Leeds	United Kingdom	The ship ran aground on the Insand, in the North Sea and was severely damaged. She was later refloated.
Prince of Orange	(United Kingdom of Great Britain and Ireland) Nevis	The ship foundered off Holyhead, Anglesey. Her crew were rescued.

== 15 January ==
List of shipwrecks: 15 January 1823
Ship	State	Description
Adventure	United Kingdom	The brig foundered off "Fedra Island".
Fame	United Kingdom	The ship was driven ashore at Shellness, Isle of Sheppey, Kent. She was refloated on 18 January and taken in to Sheerness, Kent.
Hero	United Kingdom	The ship was driven ashore at Gibraltar.
Jessy	United Kingdom	The ship was wrecked on "Fedra Island", off the coast of Northumberland. Her crew were rescued. She was on a voyage from a Welsh port to King's Lynn, Norfolk.
Lloyd	(United Kingdom of Great Britain and Ireland) Jersey	The sloop was driven ashore and wrecked at Whitby, Yorkshire. Her crew were rescued.
Manly	United Kingdom	The brig was driven ashore at Deal, Kent. She was on a voyage from Seville, Spain, to London. Manly was refloated on 16 January and put into Ramsgate, Kent.
Marjory	United Kingdom	The ship was driven ashore at Gorleston, Suffolk. She was on a voyage from Newcastle upon Tyne, Northumberland, to Odesa, Russia. Marjory was refloated on 29 January and taken in to Great Yarmouth, Norfolk.
Prince Madoc	United States	The full-rigged ship was driven ashore at Gibraltar.
Providence	United Kingdom	The ship ran aground on the Nore and was severely damaged. She was later refloated and taken in to Sheerness, Kent.
Speculateur	France	The ship was destroyed by fire at Porthdinllaen, Anglesey, United Kingdom. She was on a voyage from Bordeaux, Gironde, to Havre de Grâce, Seine-Inférieure.

== 16 January ==
List of shipwrecks: 16 January 1823
Ship	State	Description
Acorn	United Kingdom	The ship was driven ashore and wrecked at Whitby, Yorkshire. Her crew were rescued by the Whitby Lifeboat.
Cresswell	United Kingdom	The sloop ran aground on the Herd Sand, in the North Sea off North Shields, County Durham, and was damaged. She was later refloated and taken in to North Shields.
Favourite	United Kingdom	The ship was wrecked on the Herd Sand. Her crew were rescued by the South Shields Lifeboat. She was on a voyage from North Shields to London.
Garland	United Kingdom	The ship was driven ashore near Hartlepool, County Durham.
Jonah	United Kingdom	The ship was damaged on the Herd Sand. Her crew were rescued. She was on a voyage from North Shields to London. Jonah was later refloated.
Levant	United Kingdom	The ship was driven ashore at Hartlepool. Her crew were rescued by the Hartlepool Lifeboat. She was on a voyage from North Shields to London.
Lion	United Kingdom	The brig was driven ashore and wrecked at Whitby. Her crew were rescued by the Whitby Lifeboat
Mackay	United Kingdom	The ship was wrecked at Nevis. Her crew were rescued.
Magdalene	United Kingdom	The ship was driven ashore near Hartlepool.
Margaret	United Kingdom	The schooner capsized off the mouth of the Weyma River. Three of those on board were rescued. She was on a voyage from Martinique to Demerara.
Margory	Russia	The ship was driven ashore at Great Yarmouth, Norfolk, United Kingdom of Great Britain and Ireland. Her crew were rescued. She was on a voyage from Newcastle upon Tyne, Northumberland, United Kingdom, to Odesa.
Mary Ann	United Kingdom	The ship was wrecked on the Herd Sand. Her crew were rescued. She was on a voyage from North Shields to London.
Royal Oak	United Kingdom	The ship was driven ashore near Hartlepool.
Sea Nymph	United Kingdom	The ship was driven ashore and wrecked at Orford, Suffolk. Her crew were rescued. She was on a voyage from London to South Shields, County Durham.
Shannon	United Kingdom	The ship was driven ashore and wrecked at Hartlepool, County Durham.
Sterling	United Kingdom	The ship was driven ashore near Hartlepool.

== 17 January ==
List of shipwrecks: 17 January 1823
Ship	State	Description
Guardiana	United Kingdom	The ship was driven ashore and wrecked at Hartlepool, County Durham.
Venus	United Kingdom	The ship was driven ashore and wrecked at Hartlepool.

== 18 January ==
List of shipwrecks: 18 January 1823
Ship	State	Description
São Marcos	Portugal	The brig was driven ashore at Lisbon.

== 19 January ==
List of shipwrecks: 19 January 1823
Ship	State	Description
Maria Caroline	United States	The ship was wrecked at Bonnet Point, Massachusetts. She was on a voyage from New Orleans, Louisiana, to New Providence, New Jersey
Mentor	United States	The ship ran aground on the Silver Keys. She was refloated but subsequently capsized in a squall off Jamaica. Her crew survived. She was on a voyage from Newbern, North Carolina, to Jamaica.

== 20 January ==
List of shipwrecks: 20 January 1823
Ship	State	Description
Aurora	United Kingdom	The ship was wrecked on the Kentish Knock, in the North Sea off Margate, Kent. Her crew were rescued by Samuel (United Kingdom). She was on a voyage from Vaasa, Sweden, to Havre de Grâce, Seine-Inférieure, France.
Aurora	United Kingdom	The ship ran aground on the Herd Sand, in the North Sea off the coast of County Durham and was damaged. She was later refloated and taken in to North Shields, County Durham.
Beresford	United Kingdom	The ship sank at Hubberstone Pill, Pembrokeshire. She was on a voyage from Waterford to Bristol, Gloucestershire.
Carl Edward	Sweden	The ship was wrecked on the Long Sand, in the Thames Estuary. Her crew were rescued. She was on a voyage from Gothenburg to Guernsey, Channel Islands.
Dallam Tower	United Kingdom	The ship was driven ashore and wrecked at Donaghadee, County Antrim. She was on a voyage from Dublin to Donaghadee.
Friendship	United States	The ship was wrecked on Castle Island, Bermuda. Her crew were rescued. She was on a voyage from Jérémie, Haiti, to Portsmouth, New Hampshire.
Isabella	United Kingdom	The ship was wrecked between Cullercoats and Hartley, Northumberland.
Maria Sophia	Russia	The brig was lost near Venice, Kingdom of Lombardy–Venetia. She was on a voyage from Lisbon, Portugal, to Venice.

== 21 January ==
List of shipwrecks: 21 January 1823
Ship	State	Description
Britannia	United Kingdom	The ship was wrecked on the Sugar Key. She was on a voyage from Port-au-Prince, Haiti to Wilmington, Delaware, United States.
Clarendon	(United Kingdom of Great Britain and Ireland) Jamaica	The schooner was lost in Savanilla Bay, near Puerto Colombia.
Enigheden	Norway	The ship was lost about 10 nautical miles (19 km) from Rosetta, Egypt. She was on a voyage from Trieste, Austrian Empire, to Alexandria, Egypt.

== 22 January ==
List of shipwrecks: 22 January 1823
Ship	State	Description
Adelheid	Netherlands	The ship was driven ashore and wrecked at Oostvoorne, Zeeland. Her crew were rescued. She was on a voyage from Bordeaux, Gironde, France, to Rotterdam, South Holland.
Dallam Tower	United Kingdom	The brig was friven ashore and wrecked near Millisle, County Down. She was on a voyage from Dublin to Whitehaven, Cumberland.
Rolla	United Kingdom	The ship was driven ashore 12 nautical miles (22 km) east of Alexandria, Egypt. She was on a voyage from Malta to Alexandria.

== 23 January ==
List of shipwrecks: 23 January 1823
Ship	State	Description
Brothers	United Kingdom	The ship was driven ashore and damaged at Holyhead, Anglesey. She was on a voyage from Maranhão, Brazil, to Liverpool, Lancashire. Brothers was later refloated and taken in to Holyhead.
Fountain	(United Kingdom of Great Britain and Ireland) British North America	The ship was wrecked on the coast of Puerto Rico. Her crew were rescued, She was on a voyage from Trinidad to Boston, Massachusetts, United States.
Seaman's Assistant	United Kingdom	The yawl foundered in the North Sea off Walberswick, Suffolk, with the loss of all hands.

== 24 January ==
List of shipwrecks: 24 January 1823
Ship	State	Description
Calder	(United Kingdom of Great Britain and Ireland) New South Wales	The brig ran aground on a reef off Nobbys Island. She was on a voyage from Sydney to Port Jackson. Calder was later refloated.
Vigilance	France	The ship was wrecked on the coast of Hérault. She was on a voyage from Genoa, Kingdom of Sardinia, to Cette, Hérault.

== 25 January ==
List of shipwrecks: 25 January 1823
Ship	State	Description
Britannia	United Kingdom	The ship was driven ashore in the Dardanelles. She was refloated in early February.
Maria	Denmark	The ship was driven ashore and wrecked at Winterton-on-Sea, Norfolk, United Kingdom. She was on a voyage from Copenhagen to Livorno, Kingdom of Sardinia.
Mentor	United Kingdom	The ship capsized in a squall off the coast of Jamaica. Her crew survived.
Robinson	United Kingdom	The ship departed from Liverpool, Lancashire, for Dublin. No further trace, presumed foundered in the Irish Sea with the loss of all hands.
William	United Kingdom	The ship was lost near Point Lynas, Anglesey. Her crew were rescued. She was on a voyage from Liverpool, Lancashire, to Limerick.

== 26 January ==
List of shipwrecks: 26 January 1823
Ship	State	Description
Armenius	Bremen	The ship was driven ashore and wrecked at Kilnsea, Yorkshire, United Kingdom. She was on a voyage from New Orleans, Louisiana, United States, to Bremen.
St. Bento	Portugal	The brig was driven ashore and wrecked at Terceira.

== 27 January ==
List of shipwrecks: 27 January 1823
Ship	State	Description
Armenius	United States	The ship was driven ashore at "Kelsey", near the mouth of the Humber. She was on a voyage from New Orleans, Louisiana, United States, to Bremen.
Constant	Spain	The ship was wrecked on Cape Florida, United States. She was on a voyage from Havana, Cubato a Spanish port.
Tagus	United Kingdom	The schooner foundered in the English Channel off Rame Head, Cornwall.

== 28 January ==
List of shipwrecks: 28 January 1823
Ship	State	Description
Aurora	United Kingdom	The ship was driven ashore at Whitby, Yorkshire. She was on a voyage from Chatham, Kent, to Whitby.
Victoire	France	The ship was wrecked near Lymington, Hampshire, United Kingdom. Her crew were rescued. She was on a voyage from Marennes, Charente-Maritime to Dunkirk, Nord.

== 29 January ==
List of shipwrecks: 29 January 1823
Ship	State	Description
Better Luck Still	United Kingdom	The ship ran aground on the Black Middens, in the North Sea off the coast of County Durham. She was refloated on 1 February and taken in to port.
Governor Myers	United Kingdom	The ship ran aground on the Herd Sand, in the North Sea off the coast of County Durham. Governor Myers was refloated on 1 February and taken in to port.
James	United Kingdom	The ship ran aground on the Mile Rocks, in Liverpool Bay and was damaged. She was on a voyage from Waterford to Liverpool, Lancashire. James was refloated the next day.
Mary	United Kingdom	The ship was driven ashore at Milford Haven, Pembrokeshire. She was on a voyage from Dublin to Guernsey, Channel Islands.

== 30 January ==
List of shipwrecks: 30 January 1823
Ship	State	Description
John and Sarah	United Kingdom	The ship was lost off Dundee, Forfarshire, with the loss of three of her six crew.

== 31 January ==
List of shipwrecks: 31 January 1823
Ship	State	Description
Ann	United Kingdom	The ship was driven ashore and severely damaged at Plymouth, Devon. Her crew were rescued. She was on a voyage from Poole, Dorset, to Plymouth. Ann was later refloated and taken in to the Cattewater.
Bom Camiñho	Portugal	The ship was wrecked at Muros, Spain. She was on a voyage from Maranhão, Brazil, to Porto.
Britannia	United Kingdom	The ship was driven ashore at Great Yarmouth, Norfolk. Her crew were rescued. She was on a voyage from Bordeaux, Gironde, France, to Leith, Lothian. Britannia was refloated on 15 February and taken in to Great Yarmouth for repairs.
Caroline	United States	The ship foundered at Gibraltar.
Coromandel	United States	The ship foundered at Gibraltar.
Demerara	United Kingdom	The ship ran aground on the "Ganticks". She was later refloated.
Encounter	(United Kingdom of Great Britain and Ireland) Gibraltar	The storage hulk foundered at Gibraltar.
Janet & Maine	United Kingdom	The ship came ashore on the "Point of Toward". She was later refloated.
John & Mary	United Kingdom	The ship was driven ashore at Great Yarmouth. Her crew were rescued. She was refloated on 21 February and taken in to Great Yarmouth.
Lady Coate	United Kingdom	The ship came ashore in the Bay of Innerkip. She was later refloated.
Marian	United Kingdom	The ship was lost near Islay. She was on a voyage from Workington, Cumberland, to Liverpool, Lancashire.
New Prosperous	United Kingdom	The ship was driven ashore and wrecked at Great Yarmouth. Her crew were rescued. She was on a voyage from Great Yarmouth to Selby, Yorkshire.
Nimble	United Kingdom	The ship ran aground on the Herd Sand, in the North Sea off the coast of County Durham and was damaged. She was later refloated and taken in to North Shields.
Prince Ernest	United Kingdom	The ship was driven ashore and wrecked at Gibraltar.
Ravensworth	United Kingdom	The ship was driven ashore and wrecked near Blakeney, Norfolk.
Royal Oak	United Kingdom	The sloop was wrecked on the Longsands, in The Wash with the loss of one of her three crew. Survivors were rescued by a Cromer coble. She was on a voyage from Wisbech, Cambridgeshire, to Wakefield, Yorkshire.
Schellenger	Sweden	The ship foundered at Gibraltar.
Wanderer	United Kingdom	The ship foundered at Gibraltar. She was on a voyage from Smyrna, Ottoman Empire, to London.
William	United Kingdom	The ship came ashore in the Bay of Innerkip. She was later refloated.
Zealous	United Kingdom	The ship was driven ashore at Great Yarmouth. Her crew were rescued. She was refloated on 21 February and taken in to Great Yarmouth.

== Unknown date ==
List of shipwrecks: Unknown date in January 1823
Ship	State	Description
Alert	United Kingdom	The ship was driven ashore at Hartlepool, County Durham. Her crew were rescued by the Hartlepool Lifeboat. Alert was refloated on 3 March and taken in to Hartlepool in a severely damaged condition.
Altigras	Spain	The schooner was captured and burnt off Matanzas, Cuba, by a Colombian cruiser.
Baron de Recourt	France	The ship foundered in the Atlantic Ocean. Her crew were rescued by Warren (United States). She was on a voyage from Havana, Cuba, to Havre de Grâce, Seine-Inférieure.
Camel	United Kingdom	The ketch was driven ashore at Hartlepool. Her crew were rescued by the Hartlepool Lifeboat.
Elizabeth	United Kingdom	The ship foundered in the North Sea off the coast of Aberdeenshire on or before 4 January.
Expedition	United Kingdom	The ship was driven ashore at Hartlepool. Her crew were rescued by the Hartlepool Lifeboat.
Friends Goodwill	United Kingdom	The ship was driven ashore at Hartlepool. Her crew were rescued by the Hartlepool Lifeboat.
Harriet	United Kingdom	The ship departed from Lisbon, Portugal, in mid-January for Plymouth, Devon. No further trace, presumed foundered with the loss of all hands.
Pacific	United Kingdom	The ship was driven ashore on Glass Island, Outer Hebrides. Her crew were rescued. She was on a voyage from Limerick to Liverpool, Lancashire. Pacific was later refloated and taken in to Stornoway, Isle of Lewis for repairs, which were completed in mid-November.
Pilot	United Kingdom	The brig was driven ashore at North Shields, County Durham. She was later refloated.
Two Sisters	United Kingdom	The ship was driven ashore at Hartlepool. Her crew were rescued by the Hartlepool Lifeboat.
