= Queenborough-in-Sheppey =

Municipal borough in England

Coordinates: 51°25′N 0°44′E

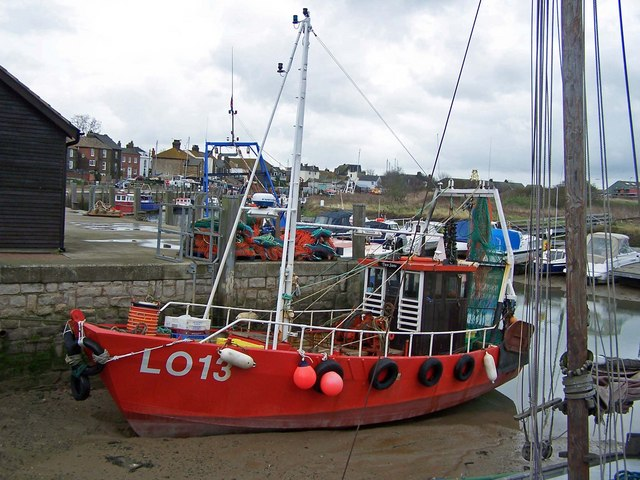
- Population
  - 1971: 31,590
- History
  - Created: 1968
  - Abolished: 1974
  - Succeeded by: Swale
- Status: Municipal borough and civil parish

Queenborough-in-Sheppey was a municipal borough in Kent, England from 1968 to 1974. It contained the parish of Queenborough in Sheppey. It was created on 1 April 1968 by a merger of the Municipal Borough of Queenborough with Sheerness Urban District and Sheppey Rural District, and occupied the entire Isle of Sheppey. In 1971 it had a population of 31,590. It incorporated the following parishes:

- Eastchurch
- Elmley
- Harty
- Leysdown-on-Sea
- Minster in Sheppey
- Queenborough
- Sheerness
- Warden

On 1 April 1974, it was abolished under the Local Government Act 1972 to form part of Swale district. The parish was also abolished. No successor parish was formed so it became unparished. A charter trustees was formed to preserve the borough status of the former borough. Queenborough and various parishes in the island now have independent parish and town councils again.

== Mayors ==
- 1968-69 A.H.R. Copland
- 1969-70 B.E.G. Bigg
- 1970-71 B.E.G. Bigg
- 1970-71 H.G. Harris
- 1971-72 W.G. Baxter
- 1972-73 R. D. Sharrock
- 1973-74 R. D. Sharrock

== Honorary Freemen of the Borough ==
- 1971 Dr Matthew De Lacey OBE TD
- 1973 Reginald James Davie JP
