= Church of St Thomas the Apostle, Harty =

Church in Kent, England

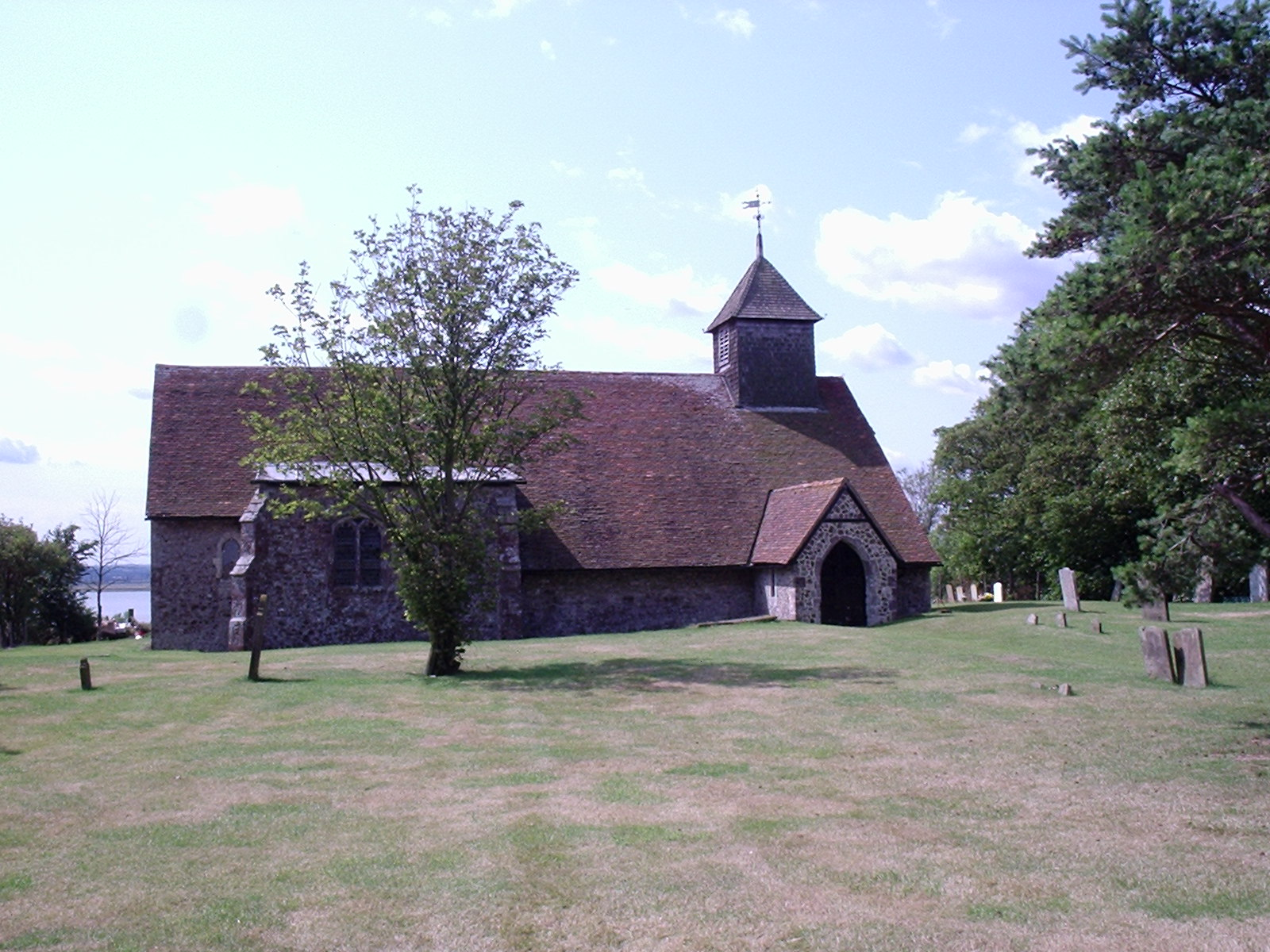
- St Thomas church on the bank of the Swale
- Church of St Thomas the Apostle, Harty
- 51°21′34″N 0°54′17″E
- Denomination: Church of England
- Website: St Thomas the Apostle - Your local church in Harty

History
- Dedication: Saint Thomas the Apostle

Architecture
- Heritage designation: Grade II*
- Architectural type: Church

Administration
- Diocese: Canterbury
- Archdeaconry: Maidstone
- Deanery: Sittingbourne
- Parish: Eastchurch with Leysdown and Harty

The Church of St Thomas the Apostle in Harty on the Isle of Sheppey in the county of Kent is a Grade II* listed building. The date of founding cannot be fixed with certainty. The official listing dates it to late 11th or early 12th century. In their guide book to the church, Patience & Perks start by reporting the raid by Harold in 1052 and then note that ""The date ascribed to the church of 1089 would be consistent with a re-building following damage by the Danes". However, on the next page they discuss the narrow walls which are indicative of Saxon builders and note that in 1989, when a shallow trench was excavated in the south wall, traces of Saxon work were found. Tufa stone was rarely used after the early Norman period, and so the use of it in a window in the north wall would indicate a date of no later than the end of the 11th century. Patience & Perks observe that the "date of AD 1089 is ascribed to the Norman work, which may well have been the re-building of an earlier structure desecrated by the Danish invaders".

After 1200 the north aisle was built and the original north wall pierced to form the existing arcade. The now blocked off south door was cut at about this time. In the head of the jamb is a scratch dial or primitive sundial. A little later the chancel was rebuilt, extended to create the sanctuary and the porch to the north door constructed. At what point the Norman chancel arch was removed is unclear, possibly at the time of the rebuilding but certainly prior to the erection of the rood screen. The 14th century saw the construction of the vestry, Lady chapel and buttressing of the south and west walls. The existing rood screen probably dates to this period. There is no rood loft but the stairs leading to one are still visible. The stairs lead out of what is now the vestry but was originally the north chapel. This was a 14th-century extension of the north aisle eastwards. Within the vestry is the remains of an aumbry or secure cupboard for holding books and valuable plate. The 19th and 20th centuries have also left their marks. The former saw heavy restoration including a complete reroofing of the nave (including reraftering) and heavy pointing of the exterior. The later has seen necessary restoration to the west end which was damaged by a bomb during World War II.

To the north of the high altar there is a niche which may have held a figure of St Thomas. Traces of a 14C painting therein have been obscured by a 15C one. There is also a niche for a figure in the Lady chapel, recently (c.1999) filled by a statue of Our Lady of Walsingham. Against the western wall of the lady chapel is a 14th-century oak muniment chest, the front of which is carved with a representation of a joust. In 1987 it was stolen and recovered from Phillips auction rooms. To protect it, the lady chapel arch is filled with an iron screen. It was during the installation of this screen that the shallow trench referred to above was dug.

The church is unusual that there is no electricity or running water. Lighting in the nave is provided by hanging paraffin lamps and by wall mounted lamps with reflectors. The parish is within the Diocese of Canterbury and deanery of Sittingbourne. There is one bell hung for swing chiming of approximately 4 long hundredweight (450 lb; 200 kg).

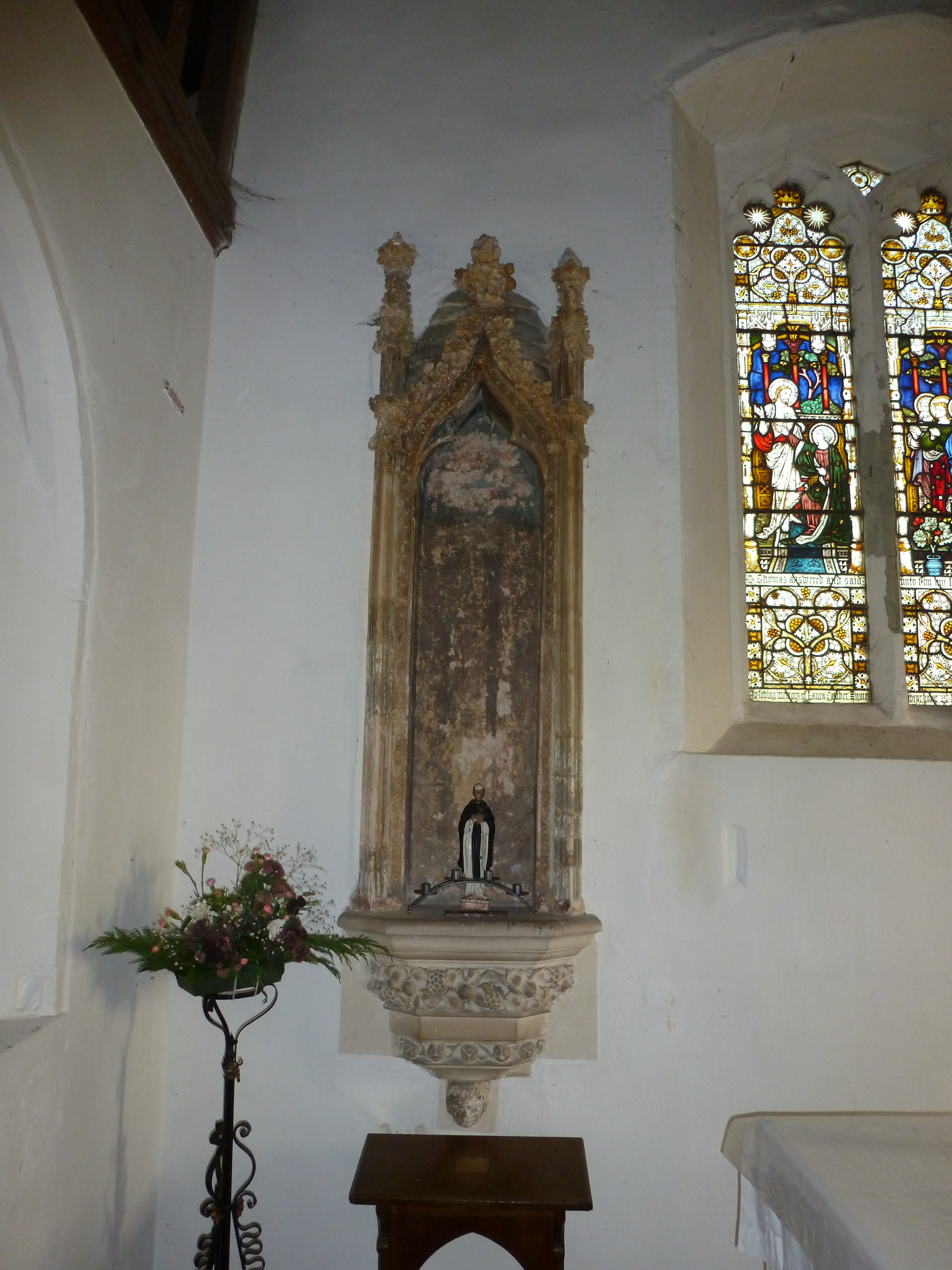
Niche beside the high altar

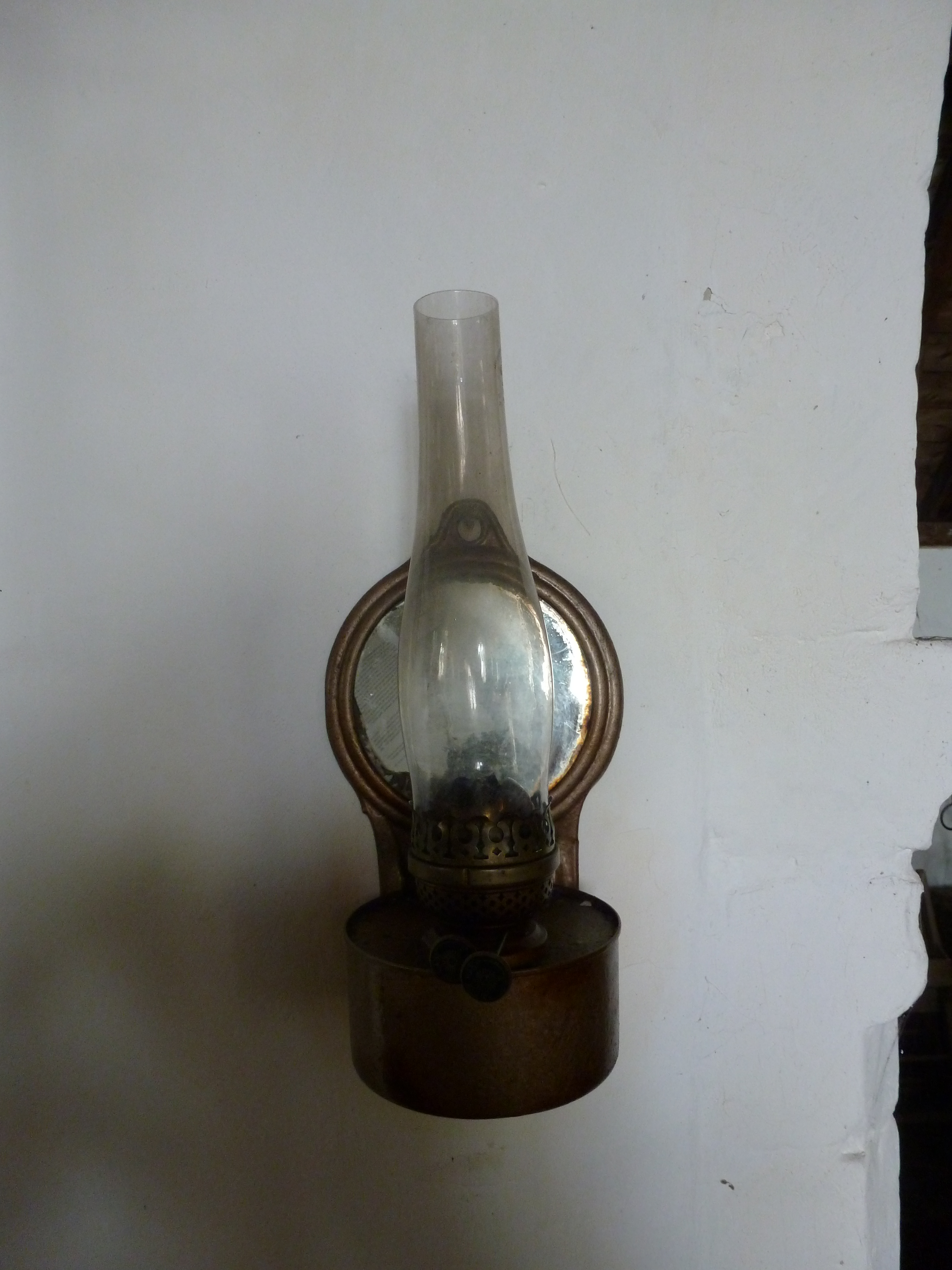
Paraffin lamp in nave

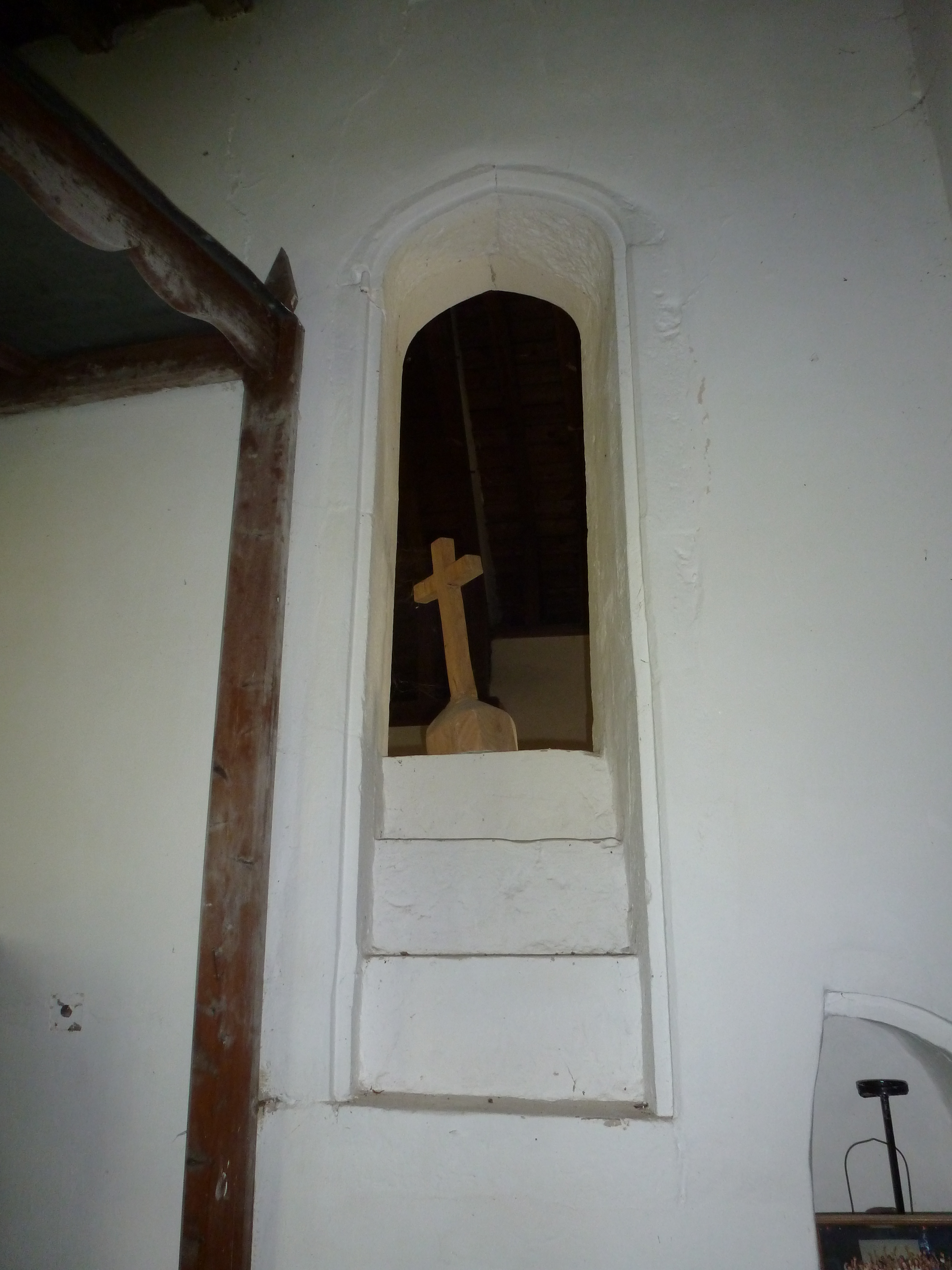
Stairs to the old rood loft

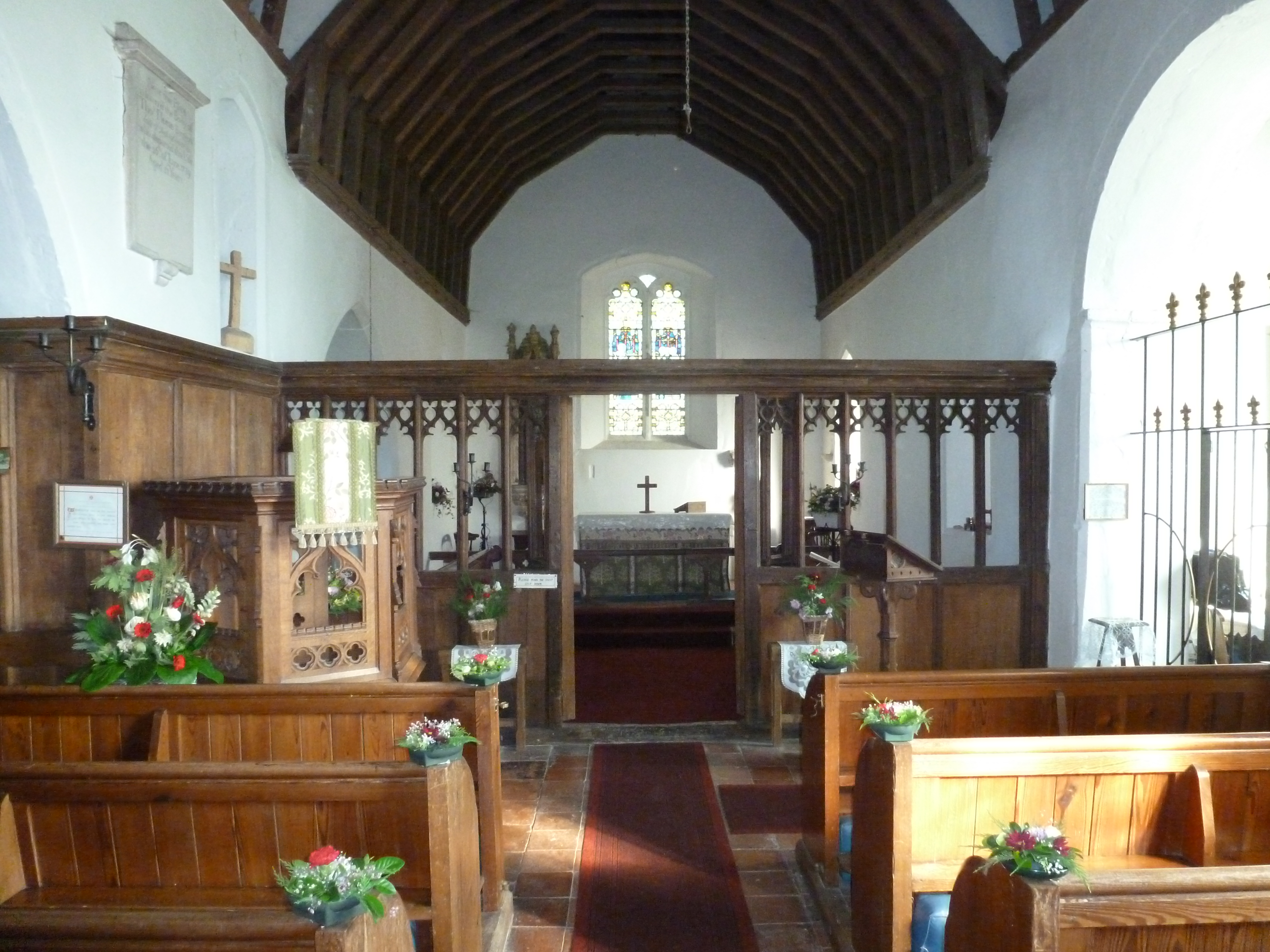
East end showing rood screen

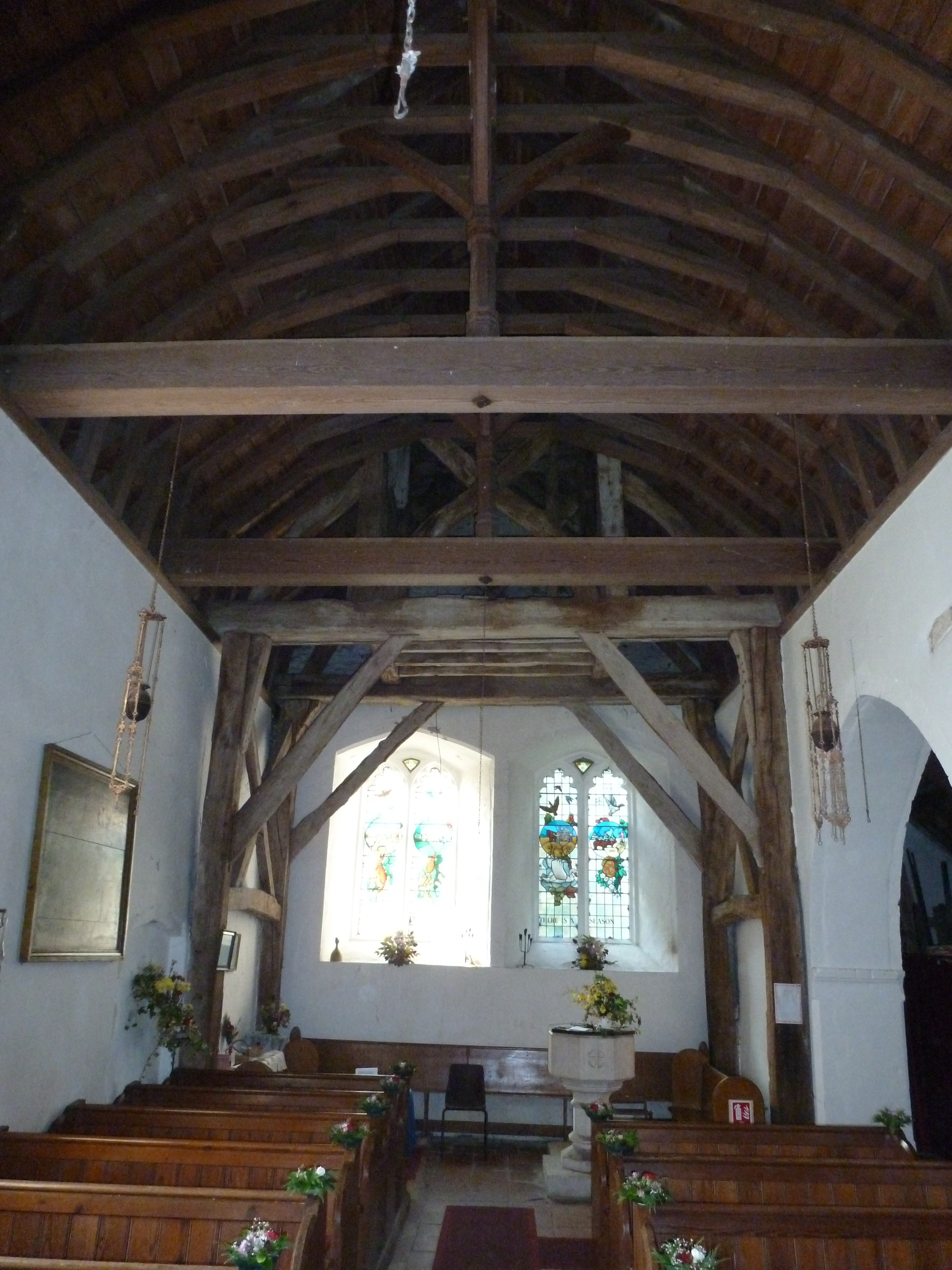
West end showing hanging lamps and the bell tower base

== Sources ==
- Pevsner, Nikolaus; Cherry, Bridget; O'Brien, Charles (2007). Essex. The Buildings of England. Vol. 5. London: Yale University Press.
