= Listed buildings in Leysdown-on-Sea =

Historic structures in Kent, England

Leysdown-on-Sea is a village and civil parish in the Swale District of Kent, England. It contains five listed buildings that are recorded in the National Heritage List for England. Of these one is grade II* and four are grade II.

This list is based on the information retrieved online from Historic England.

== Key ==
Grade	Criteria
I	Buildings that are of exceptional interest
II*	Particularly important buildings of more than special interest
II	Buildings that are of special interest

== Listing ==
Name	Grade	Location	Type	Completed (Note: The date given is the date used by Historic England as significant for the initial building or that of an important part in the structure's description.)	Date designated	Grid ref. (Note: The grid reference is based on the British national grid reference system, sometimes known as OSGB36, used by the Ordnance Survey.) Geo-coordinates	Notes	Entry number (Note: The "List Entry Number" is a unique number assigned to each listed building and scheduled monument by Historic England.)	Image	Wikidata
Church of St Thomas the Apostle	II*	Harty Ferry Road, Harty	church building		27 June 1963	TR0231366279; 51°21′34″N 0°54′16″E		1258076	Church of St Thomas the Apostle More images	Q17546403
Ferry House Inn	II	Harty Ferry Road, Harty	pub		30 June 1978	TR0152465948; 51°21′25″N 0°53′35″E		1258222	Ferry House Inn More images	Q26549482
Park Farmhouse	II	Harty Ferry Road, Harty			27 June 1963	TR0171966233; 51°21′34″N 0°53′45″E		1258074	Upload Photo	Q26549360
Paradise Farmhouse	II	Leysdown Road, Leysdown On Sea			30 June 1978	TR0228570351; 51°23′46″N 0°54′23″E		1258506	Upload Photo	Q26549732
Muswell Manor	II	Wing Road, Leysdown On Sea			30 June 1978	TR0430969371; 51°23′12″N 0°56′06″E		1273062	Upload Photo	Q26562847

== See also ==
- Grade I listed buildings in Kent
- Grade II* listed buildings in Kent

== Sources ==
- Newman, John (2013) [1969], Kent: North-East and East, The Buildings of England, New Haven and London: Yale University Press, ISBN 978-0-300-18506-5
