= Sheppey Cliffs and Foreshore =

Protected area in Kent, England

Coordinates: 51.421°N 0.865°E

- Site of Special Scientific Interest
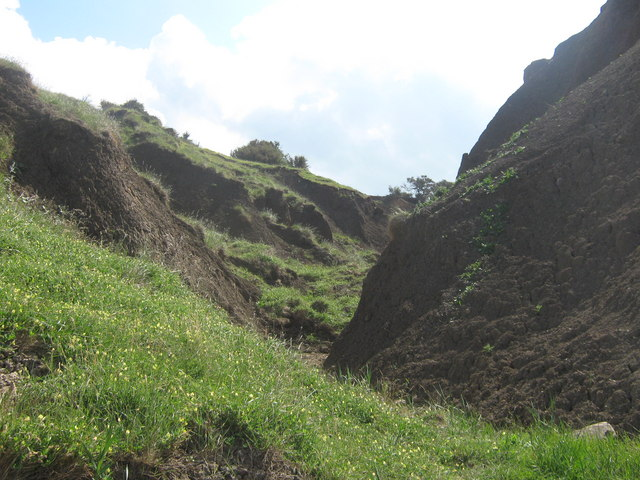
- Barrow Brook Valley
- Location of Sheppey Cliffs and Foreshore.
- Area of search: Kent
- Grid reference: TQ 993 730
- Interest: Biological; Geological
- Area: 303.6 hectares (750 acres)
- Notification date: 1998
- Location map: Magic Map

Sheppey Cliffs and Foreshore is a 303.6-hectare (750-acre) biological and geological Site of Special Scientific Interest which stretches between Minster and Leysdown-on-Sea in Kent, England. It includes five Geological Conservation Review sites. This site exposes Eocene London Clay with well-preserved fossil fauna and flora, which have been studied since the eighteenth century.

== The SSSI ==
London clay was deposited in a shallow sea forming beds up to 200 metres (660 ft) deep at the eastern end. Up to five cycles of deposition, each followed by shallowing of the sea, have been found. Each cycle begins with coarser material being laid down, and this was followed by clay which became increasingly sandy. These layers have been labelled A to E (with A being the oldest), and at Sheppey, the layers C to E are exposed on the cliffs and foreshore. Each layer has its own flora and fauna, with well-preserved fossils of invertebrates including bivalve and gastropod molluscs, brachiopods and nautiloids, as well as articulated lobsters and crabs, and sometimes insects.

There is also a range of fossils of sharks, rays and bony fish, reptiles and birds. Some of the bones occur in nodules in the clay, and much material has been washed out onto the beach. Turtles, crocodiles and snakes are represented among the reptiles, and the birds include members of sixteen families. Sheppey cliffs are also a rich palaeobotany site. Many fossils of Eocene plants have been found, mostly from layers D and E, and over 300 species have been recorded. Dominant among them are tropical lianas; the habitat seems to have been a lush forest bordering a warm, shallow sea.

== Ecology ==
The site is botanically important for the dragon's teeth (Tetragonolobus maritimus) which is found in only a few locations in Britain, and several other uncommon plants occur here, one being bithynian vetch (Vicia bithynica).
