= Leysdown-on-Sea =

Village in Kent, England

Coordinates: 51.4°N 0.91667°E

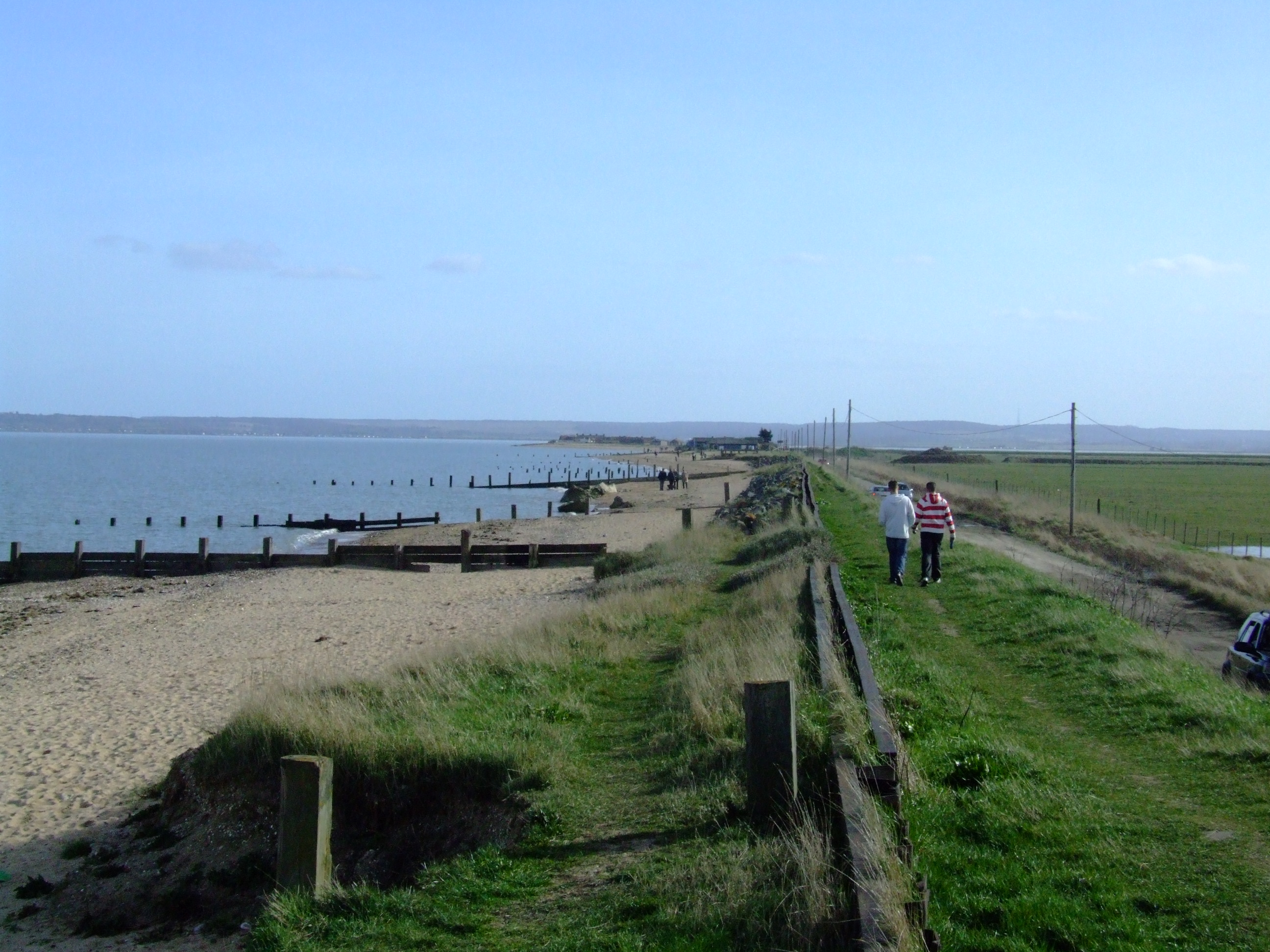
- The sea wall to the east of Leysdown

- Location within Kent
- Area: 1.055 km^{2} (0.407 sq mi)
- Population: 936 (2020 estimate)
  - Density: 887/km^{2} (2,300/sq mi)
- OS grid reference: TR 034 704
- Civil parish: Leysdown
- District: Swale
- Shire county: Kent
- Region: South East
- Country: England
- Sovereign state: United Kingdom
- Post town: SHEERNESS
- Postcode district: ME12
- Dialling code: 01795
- Police: Kent
- Fire: Kent
- Ambulance: South East Coast
- UK Parliament: Sittingbourne and Sheppey

Leysdown-on-Sea is a village on the east coast of the Isle of Sheppey, in the borough of Swale in Kent, England. In 2020 it had an estimated population of 936. The civil parish is Leysdown and includes the settlements of Bay View, Shellness and Harty. In 2011 it had a population of 1,256.

== History ==
It is recorded in the Domesday Book of 1086 as being called "Legesdun"; the name is thought to be derived from the Anglo-Saxon words Leswe (pasture) and Dun (hill).

A very small hamlet up to late Victorian times, it was developed a little after the arrival of the Sheppey Light Railway in 1903, though grand plans for the establishment of a large resort with hotels never materialised. The railway was closed in the 1950s.

On 2 May 1909, John Moore-Brabazon became the first resident British citizen to make a recognised powered heavier-than-air flight in the UK flying from the Aero Club's ground at Leysdown in his Voisin biplane Bird of Passage.

In 1961 the civil parish of "Leysdown on Sea" had a population of 565. On 1 March 1949 the parish was renamed from "Leysdown" to "Leysdown on Sea", on 1 April 1968 the parish was abolished to form Queenborough in Sheppey. On 1 April 1983 a parish called "Leysdown" was formed.

== Geography ==
Leysdown is located a mile to the SSE of Warden and three miles to the ESE of Eastchurch. To the SSE lies the hamlet of Shellness and to the southwest is an area of marshland known as the Leysdown marshes. The island is located partly in The Swale and partly in the North Sea with a shingle beach and mudflats extending out to sea. It is recommended in the 2009 Good Beach Guide.

== Economy ==
There are several large farms surrounding the village, with a mixture of pasture and arable land, but the local economy is primarily driven by tourism in the summer months, with many visitors coming from London. Leysdown has one of the largest concentrations of holiday parks in Kent, with many caravan and chalet parks. During the winter months the shops, clubs and pubs stay open, with the population of Leysdown, Warden and Bay View providing custom. In the past few years a boot fair has become a regular fixture on Sundays and there is also a market on Saturdays.

Briefly, in the early 20th century a significant part of the economy came from the embryonic aviation industry, with the UK's first aircraft factory built in Leysdown in 1909 by the Short Brothers. By the following year, however, operations had moved to nearby Eastchurch.

== Amusements ==
Leysdown is well known for its family amusement arcades adjacent to the sea. There are 6 arcades, each with its own 18-only section with high jackpots. Some arcades give tickets from their many machines which can be exchanged for small trinkets, toys and other prizes.

== Landmarks ==
The Spinney is an area of open space in the middle of Leysdown, with children's play area and benches. It takes its name from the woodland that was there until the 1960s.

Leysdown is also known for one of the UK's few official naturist beaches, sited beyond the town along the un-made road. In 2011 a Royal Navy bomb disposal team removed 61 bombs that had been washed onto the beach.

== Transport ==
The B2231 is the only road into Leysdown, with regular bus services from Chalkwell providing public transport links to the rest of the Island and the mainland. There was formerly a bus station in Leysdown but it was demolished in the early 1990s.

The Sheppey Light Railway formerly provided a rail link to the rest of the Island but was dismantled in the 1950s.

== Education ==
The nearest primary school is St Clements Primary School situated on Leysdown Road, Warden, while the nearest secondary school is Oasis Academy Isle of Sheppey (formerly the Oasis Academy).

== Churches ==
On the outskirts of Leysdown is the graveyard of St Clement's Church, which was demolished in the 1980s. All Saints' (Anglican) church in Eastchurch and Sheppey Evangelical Church, part of the Countess of Huntingdon's Connexion are close to Leysdown.

== In popular culture ==
Leysdown was the inspiration for the song "Pulling Mussels (from the Shell)" (1980) by the band Squeeze. According to critic Chris Woodstra, the song "offers a series of detailed snapshots of the different walks of life on a seaside holiday in Leysdown-on-Sea."

Leysdown was used as a filming location for the Channel 4/Netflix black comedy The End of the F***ing World, Kiss Me First, Silent Witness - Series 26 and, drama films Strawberry Fields (2011) and Bird (2024).

It was also the location for the Orbital and Sleaford Mods video for 'Dirty Rat' (2022).

== See also ==
- Listed buildings in Leysdown-on-Sea
