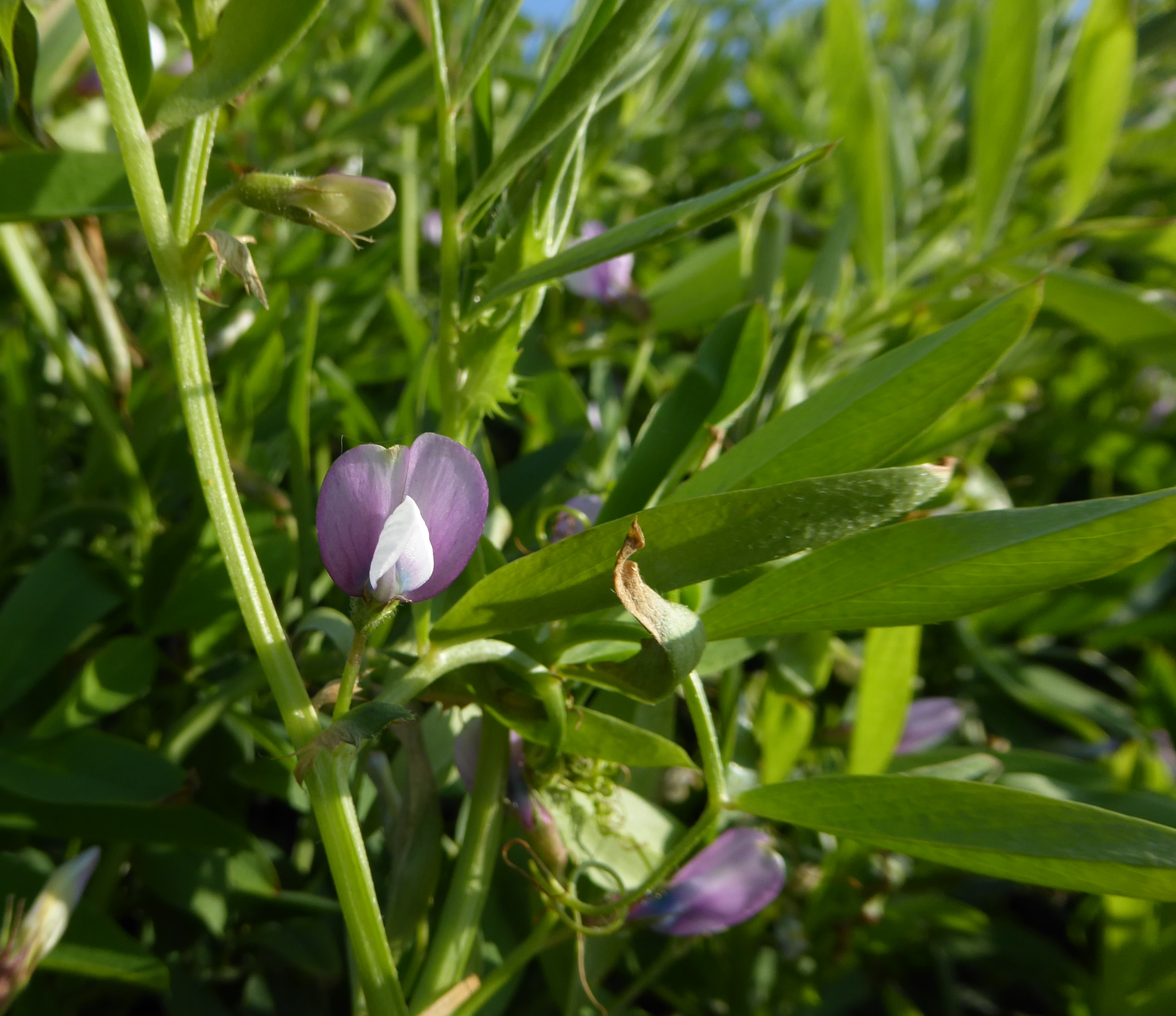

Conservation status
- Least Concern (IUCN 3.1)

Scientific classification
- Kingdom: Plantae
- Clade: Tracheophytes
- Clade: Angiosperms
- Clade: Eudicots
- Clade: Rosids
- Order: Fabales
- Family: Fabaceae
- Subfamily: Faboideae
- Tribe: Fabeae
- Genus: Vicia
- Species: V. bithynica

Binomial name
- Vicia bithynica (L.) L.

Synonyms
- Lathyrus bithynicus L. Ervum bithynicum (L.) Stank.

= Vicia bithynica =

Species of flowering plant

Vicia bithynica known as Bithynian vetch, is a species of flowering plant in the bean family Fabaceae. It was described by Carl Linnaeus, initially as Lathyrus bithynicus (as a type of pea) but later moved to the genus Vicia (vetches). The specific name is derived from Bithynia, an ancient kingdom situated on the north coast of Anatolia, in modern day Turkey.

== Description ==
An annual with climbing stems, scrambling or climbing to about 60 cm tall. The leaves are arranged alternately along the stem, are up to about 9 cm long, have 2–3 pairs of leaflets, and end in branched tendrils. The petioles are 2 cm long with a large, ovate, dentate stipule at the base. The flowers are arranged in pairs (although sometimes solitary) on long (5 cm) peduncles branching from the leaf axils. The petals are purple and white, 2 cm long, and have 10 stamens and 1 style. The fruit is a hairy pod or legume up to 5 cm long with 4 to 8 seeds. It has 14 chromosomes.

Vicia bithynica is not cultivated for human or livestock consumption. The seeds contain high levels of vicine, which causes favism amongst susceptible individuals.

== Habitat ==
The habitat of V. bithynica is often described as 'woodland and scrub' but Bennett & Maxted examined many herbarium specimens for habitat data and concluded that it was most common in calcareous grassland, while others describe it as a weed of agricultural fields. In Greece, it is a native therophyte of dry scrub (phrygana) and grassland.

In Britain, at the northern extremity of its range, it is considered to be a plant of coastal undercliffs, the backs of beaches, bare ground, hedges and old railway lines.

== Distribution ==
Vicia bithynica is widespread around the Mediterranean and in Europe as far north as Scandinavia, and there are isolated populations in the Azores, United States, Australia and New Zealand.

It is common in Turkey and considered to be native there, as it is in Malta, becoming rarer further north. In Britain it is classified as Vulnerable and is declining in abundance, although it is protected in several sites of special scientific interest such as Sheppey Cliffs and Foreshore and Swanscombe Peninsula.
