= Harty, Kent =

Hamlet in Kent, England

Coordinates: 51.364°N 0.891°E

Harty
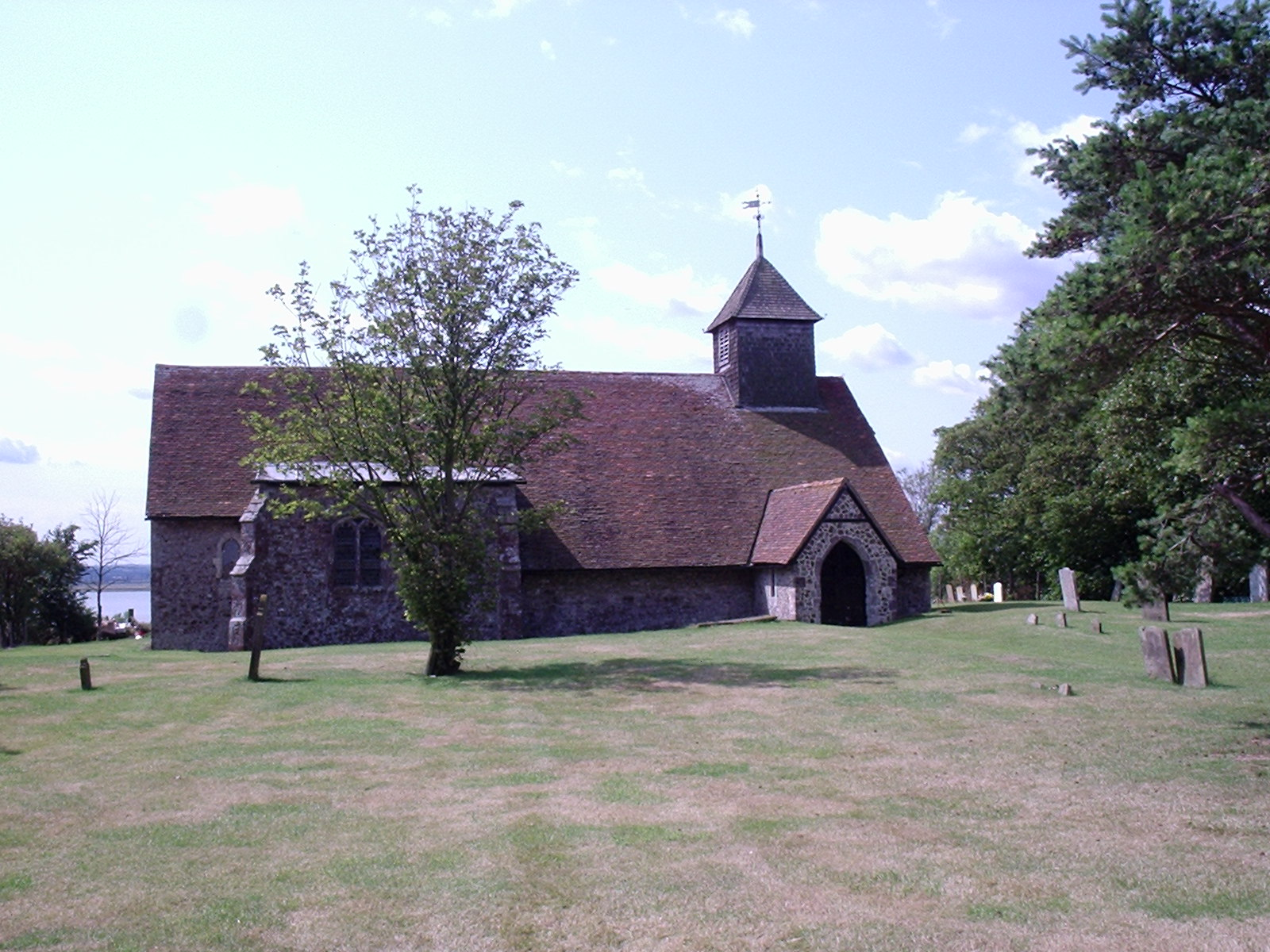
- Harty Church on the bank of the Swale

- Location within Kent
- OS grid reference: TR023663
- Civil parish: Leysdown
- District: Swale
- Shire county: Kent
- Region: South East
- Country: England
- Sovereign state: United Kingdom
- Post town: Sheerness
- Postcode district: ME12 4
- Police: Kent
- Fire: Kent
- Ambulance: South East Coast
- UK Parliament: Sittingbourne and Sheppey

Harty is a small hamlet in the civil parish of Leysdown, on the Isle of Sheppey, in the Swale district, in the county of Kent, England. It consists of a few cottages, a church and a public house, the Ferry Inn (a Grade II listed building).

== History ==
The earliest recorded evidence of human occupation comes from a late Bronze Age hoard of axes, gouged bronze founder's appliances and metal. The find has wider importance from the information it gives into methods used for casting in the late Bronze Age. Evidence of Roman occupation also exists; finds of tesserae, roof and flue tiles may indicate the site of a Roman villa.

During the Middle Ages there were extensive salt workings. Remains today consist of groups of salt mounds which are the waste left over from the process. Park Farmhouse is a Grade II listed building dating from the 16 century.

In 1798 Edward Hasted recorded that an earlier form of the name was 'Harteigh' which he presumes came from the Saxon Heord-tu, an island "filled with herds of cattle". Other forms of the name have been Hertei (1086), Heartege (1100), Herteye (1242) and the modern Harty by 1610. Hasted also noted that the islet was part of the hundred of Faversham unlike the rest of the island of Sheppey which came within Milton Hundred. There were also 4000 sheep and six cottages with 20 people, but of those 20 six were on permanent poor relief and another 3 occasionally so.

In 1961 the civil parish had a population of 55. On 1 April 1968 the parish was abolished to form Queenborough in Sheppey.

Harty is a few minutes walk from the Swale National Nature Reserve. Public footpaths run from Harty, along the southern extent of the reserve to the hamlet of Shellness, and back around the reserve's northern perimeter to Harty.

== Church of St Thomas the Apostle ==
The church of St Thomas the Apostle is a Grade II* listed building. The date of founding cannot be fixed with certainty but the official listing dates it to late 11th or early 12th century. The church is unusual that there is no electricity or running water. Lighting in the nave is provided by hanging paraffin lamps and by wall mounted lamps with reflectors.

== Ferries and bridge ==
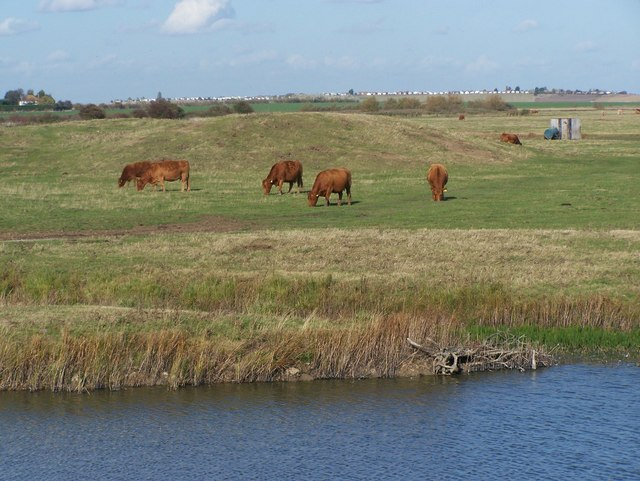
Saltworks in Harty Marshes Saltwork hillocks of medieval times, surrounded by cattle. Looking north towards Leysdown-on-Sea

Hasted also records the existence of the ferry across The Swale to Oare on the mainland. The old ferry is reflected in the name of the adjacent Inn. The rights to the ferry were, and still are, held by the landlord of the Ferry House Inn. The southern, mainland, terminus was close to the villages of Oare and Uplees. Today the remains of the southern jetty are on the coast of the Oare Marshes nature reserve. A small cluster of buildings close by still bear the name Harty Ferry Cottages. During World War I the Royal Engineers built a bridge across the Swale. (Note: Patience & Perks refers to this as a bailey bridge, but the bailey bridge was not developed until 1941. The Swale at this point is 1 kilometre (0.6 mi) wide and so possibly some form of pontoon bridge is meant.) The last ferry boat fell to pieces around 1941 and has never been replaced, although the official list entry for the church mentions the ferry as being in use until 1946. An attempt to start a small hovercraft service between the Harty Ferry Inn and Oare Creek in 1970 by the then landlord, Ben Fowler, failed after a few days.

Hasted (1798) records:

... that there was formerly a bridge leading from hence [Harty] into Shepey, then called Tremseth bridge, which had been broken down by a violent inundation of the sea, and the channel thereby made so deep, that a new one could not be laid; and therefore the inhabitants of Shepey, who before repaired it, maintained in the room of it two ferry-boats, to carry passengers to and fro. There is now no bridge here, and the fleet which divided this island from that of Shepey is become so very narrow, and has for several years past been so much filled up, that, excepting at high tides and overflow of the waters, Harty has ceased to have any appearance of an island.

The "violent inundation" appears to have occurred in 1293. The silting of the fleet rendering Harty a tidal island was complete by the time Hastead was writing in 1798. A hundred years later (in 1893) during floods the fleet grew to be 100 yards (91 m) wide but today is cut off from Windmill Creek by a causeway.

== In popular culture ==
Author Russell Hoban repurposes the Isle of Harty as "Harts Ease" in his 1980, post apocalyptic novel Riddley Walker.
