= Warden, Kent =

Coordinates: 51.405°N 0.905°E

Warden
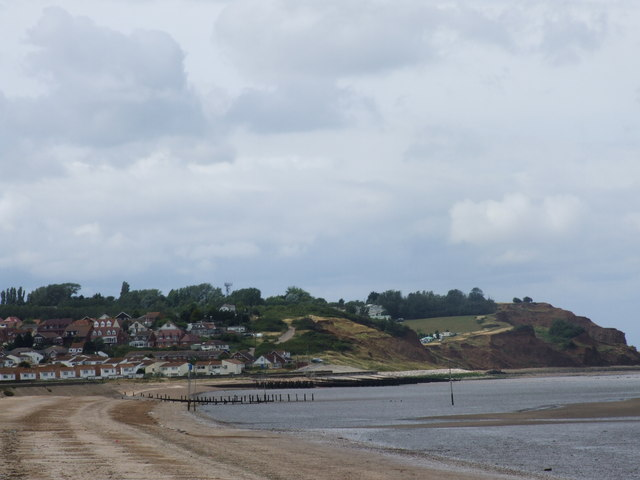
- Warden

- Location within Kent
- Population: 1,763 (2011 Census)
- District: Swale
- Shire county: Kent
- Region: South East
- Country: England
- Sovereign state: United Kingdom
- Post town: Sheerness
- Postcode district: ME12
- Police: Kent
- Fire: Kent
- Ambulance: South East Coast

Warden is a small settlement on the northeast coast of the Isle of Sheppey, Kent, United Kingdom. The largest residential part of Warden is generally called Warden Bay. The place where the beach becomes inaccessible and the cliffs become prominent is generally referred to as Warden Point.

== History ==
It was once called Warne. At the time of the Domesday Survey, the parish and manor of Warden was controlled by the Manor of Milton. In King Edward I's reign (1272 to 1307), it was owned by the Savage family. In 1295, John le Savage obtained a charter of free warren for his lands in the manor.

In 1376, Sir Richard at Leese MP became owner of the manor; he was High Sheriff of Kent in 1367. When he died in 1394, the manor passed to his widow Dionisia. In 1727, it was sold to Sir Thomas Stevens (who was a High Sheriff of Surrey in 1726). After he died it passed to Thomas West (Sir Thomas's son), and then to James West (husband of Thomas West's sister Sarah). James was the son of Thomas West. He was recorder of St. Alban's, Secretary to the Treasury, and a Fellow of the Royal Society and of the Society of Antiquaries of London.

== Cliff erosion ==
The clay cliffs stretching from Warden Bay towards Warden Point have been eroding for decades with residents from the Isle of Sheppey warning of risks to property. In December 2017, Conservative MP for Sittingbourne and Sheppey, Gordon Henderson, raised the issue of cliff erosion on Sheppey affecting Warden and the nearby village of Eastchurch. In her reply, Dr. Thérèse Coffey stated that "that 1,000 caravans and 124 buildings will be at risk over the next 100 years".

In July 2020, the topic of cliff erosion hit the national news when residents experienced their homes collapsing due to the on-going coastal erosion and called on the local government and Environment Agency for help and better funding to protect homes.

== See also ==
- Sheppey Cliffs and Foreshore
