= Shellness =

Hamlet in Kent, England

Coordinates: 51.3735°N 0.9503°E

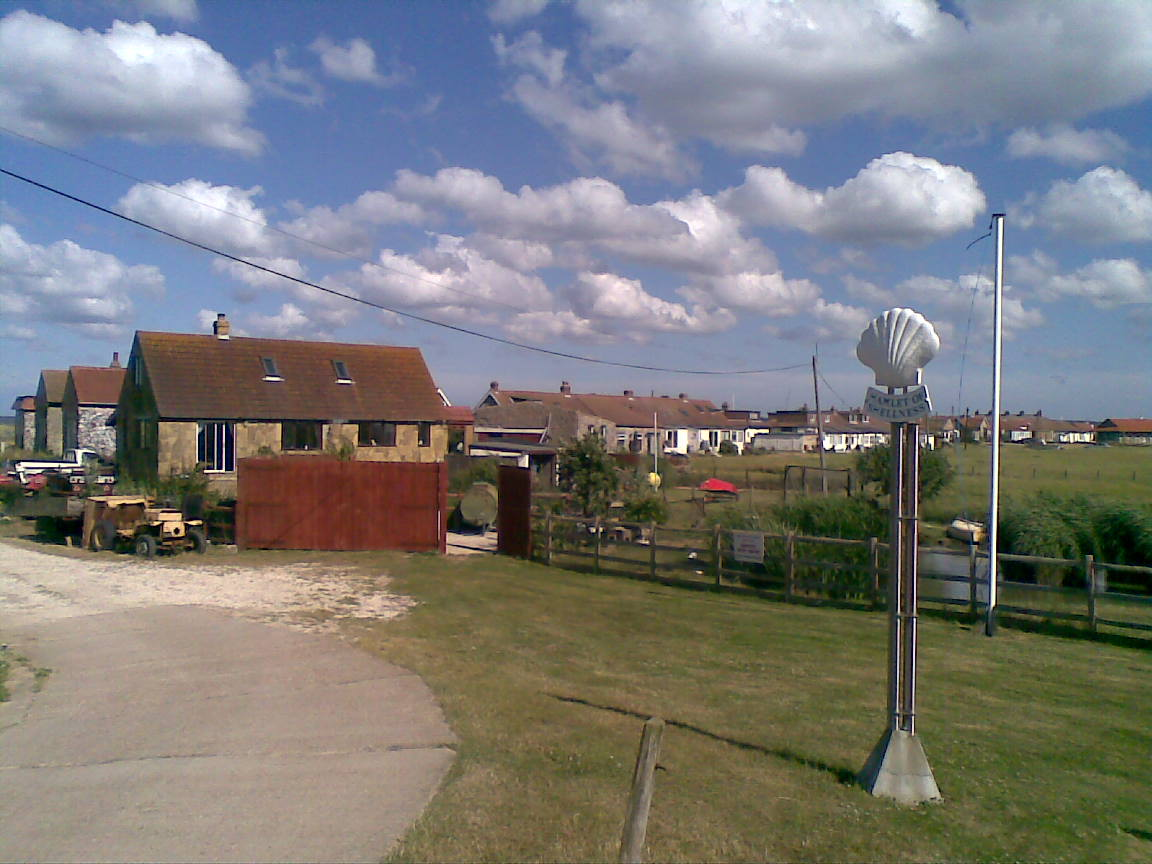
- The hamlet of Shellness

- Location within Kent
- OS grid reference: TR0569
- Civil parish: Leysdown
- District: Swale
- Shire county: Kent
- Region: South East
- Country: England
- Sovereign state: United Kingdom
- Post town: Sheerness
- Postcode district: ME12
- Police: Kent
- Fire: Kent
- Ambulance: South East Coast
- UK Parliament: Sittingbourne and Sheppey

Shellness is a small coastal hamlet on the most easterly point of the Isle of Sheppey in the Borough of Swale in the English county of Kent. The settlement forms part of the parish of Leysdown. It is south-east of the main village of Leysdown-on-Sea and north-east of the hamlet of Harty.
