= Sarah Baker =

Sarah Baker may refer to:

- Sarah Baker (actress) American actress and comedian.
- Sarah Baker (singer) (born 1943), American singer, songwriter and musician
- Sarah Baker (painter) (1899–1983), American artist
- Sarah Jane Baker (born 1969), British convicted criminal, transgender rights activist and author
- Sarah Martha Baker (1887–1917), English botanist and ecologist
- Sarah Baker (18th-century actress) (1736/37–1816)

== See also ==
- Sara Josephine Baker (1873–1945), American physician
