= William Thomas Pike bibliography =

Biographical list

William Thomas Pike (January 1838 – 22 April 1924) edited and wrote Pike's New Century Series, 1898–1912, and some books of local interest to his native county of Sussex, England.

== Pike's New Century Series, 1898–1912 ==
This is a series of quarto volumes, published at 19 Grand Parade, Brighton, and paid for by subscription. Each volume contains the topography and biographies of a specific county of England or Ireland. Named authors, and occasionally Pike himself, were responsible for the topography sections, Pike's team edited and expanded the biographies supplied by the subjects who were also the subscribers, and Pike edited the whole.

[The series combined] a text with the qualities of a high-grade guide-book, printed on art paper and copiously illustrated with half-tone plates, with an illustrated biographical dictionary, the whole bound in good-quality imitation morocco".

The local authors who contributed the topographical sections were sometimes "distinguished antiquarians", but otherwise those sections do "vary greatly in quality". The way in which the order of the biographical section follows established tradition, and its almost total exclusion of women, indicates the social hierarchy of the pre-First World War era. In the biographical section of each volume, the "lord lieutenant, bishop and sheriff" are first illustrated and described, with larger photographic portraits than the rest. Following those, there are biographies and photographic portraits of "the nobility and gentry, the gentry and magistrates, the clergy, the legal, medical, dental, scholastic, literary and musical professions, engineers, architects and surveyors, auctioneers, estate agents and accountants, veterinary surgeons, and businessmen" — in that order.

The 1912 East Anglia volume was reviewed by the newspaper, Truth, in 1913:

Among those literary productions which appeal to parochial patriotism and the simple vanity of the undistinguished, is one entitled East Anglia in the Twentieth Century ... One feature was to be a full account of all the East Anglian churches, and another was to be the usual biographical list of celebrities. The price was £5 5s (equivalent to £656.55 in 2023). A subscriber interested in churches complains that so little space is devoted to them, while, on the other hand, the list of nobility and gentry is so complete that even the name of the manager of a Cambridge brewery, who is now a guest of H.M. prisons, is included in it. That is the worst of being a five-guinea celebrity. You never know who is going to share the honour with you.

=== List of volumes ===
(Note: in the 1980s, the biographical sections and indices of Pike's New Century Series were reprinted in the A Dictionary of Edwardian Biography series).

Numbered volumes

- Pike, W. T. (1898). Pike, W. T. (ed.). Vol. 1. Bristol in 1898: Contemporary Biographies. Brighton, Sussex: W. T. Pike & Co. (In two volumes).
- Tracy, William Burnett (1901). Pike, W. T. (ed.). Vol. 2. Manchester and Salford at the Close of the Nineteenth Century. Brighton, Sussex: W. T. Pike & Co. This volume boasts the rare inclusion of a woman: Mrs William Henry Vaudrey, lady mayoress of Manchester 1896–1899. Her portrait by Pike & Co. is shown on page 61 alongside her husband the lord mayor of Manchester, but although her name is mentioned in his biography, she is an exception in the volume as no biography is given for her.
- Pike, W. T. (1900). Pike, W. T. (ed.). Vol. 3. Birmingham at the Opening of the Twentieth Century. Brighton, Sussex: W. T. Pike & Co.
- Addy, Sidney Oldall (1901). Pike, W. T. (ed.). Vol. 4. Sheffield and Neighbourhood at the Opening of the Twentieth Century. Brighton, Sussex: W. T. Pike & Co.
- Briscoe, John Potter. (1901). Pike, W. T. (ed.). Vol. 5. Nottinghamshire and Derbyshire at the Opening of the Twentieth Century. Brighton, Sussex: W. T. Pike & Co.
- Scott, Herbert (1902). Pike, W. T. (ed.). Vol. 6. West Riding of Yorkshire at the Opening of the Twentieth Century. Brighton, Sussex: W. T. Pike & Co.
- Scarff, William (1902). Pike, W. T. (ed.). Vol. 7. Leicestershire and Rutland at the Opening of the Twentieth Century. Brighton, Sussex: W. T. Pike & Co.
- Scott, W. H. (1903). Pike, W. T. (ed.). Vol. 8. North and East Ridings of Yorkshire at the Opening of the Twentieth Century. Brighton, Sussex: W. T. Pike & Co.
- Tracy, W. B. (1903). Pike, W. T. (ed.). Vol. 9. Lancashire at the Opening of the Twentieth Century. Brighton, Sussex: W. T. Pike & Co.
- Jones, T. Bavington (1904). Pike, W. T. (ed.). Vol. 10. Kent at the Opening of the Twentieth Century. Brighton, Sussex: W. T. Pike & Co.
- Head, Robert (1904). Pike, W. T. (ed.). Vol. 11. Cheshire at the Opening of the Twentieth Century. Brighton, Sussex: W. T. Pike & Co.
- Eddington, Alexander (1904). Pike, W. T. (ed.). Vol. 12. Edinburgh and the Lothians at the Opening of the Twentieth Century. Brighton, Sussex: W. T. Pike & Co.
- Jacob, William Henry (1905). Pike, W. T. (ed.). Vol. 13. Hampshire at the Opening of the Twentieth Century. Brighton, Sussex: W. T. Pike & Co.
- Jamieson, James (1905). Pike, W. T. (ed.). Vol. 14. Northumberland at the Opening of the Twentieth Century. Brighton, Sussex: W. T. Pike & Co.
- Welch, Charles (1905). Pike, W. T. (ed.). Vol. 15. London at the Opening of the Twentieth Century. Brighton, Sussex: W. T. Pike & Co.
- Dorling, Edward Earle (1906). Pike, W. T. (ed.). Vol. 16. Wiltshire and Dorset at the Opening of the Twentieth Century. Brighton, Sussex: W. T. Pike & Co.
- Jamieson, James (1906). Pike, W. T. (ed.). Vol. 17. Durham at the Opening of the Twentieth Century. Brighton, Sussex: W. T. Pike & Co.
- Hitchen, W. E. (1906). Pike, W. T. (ed.). Vol. 18. Surrey at the Opening of the Twentieth Century. Brighton, Sussex: W. T. Pike & Co. (Re-issued in 1907 as no. 24).
- Penn, Cameron (1907). Pike, W. T. (ed.). Vol. 19. Staffordshire and Shropshire at the Opening of the Twentieth Century. Brighton, Sussex: W. T. Pike & Co.
- There was no number 20.
- Jenkins, John Austin (1907). Pike, W. T. (ed.). Vol. 21. South Wales and Monmouthshire at the Opening of the Twentieth Century. Brighton, Sussex: W. T. Pike & Co.
- Hunt, Alfred (1907). Pike, W. T. (ed.). Vol. 22. Lincolnshire at the Opening of the Twentieth Century. Brighton, Sussex: W. T. Pike & Co.
- Vincent, James Edmund (1907). Pike, W. T. (ed.). Vol. 23. Berkshire, Buckinghamshire and Bedfordshire (Berks, Bucks & Beds) at the Opening of the Twentieth Century. Brighton, Sussex: W. T. Pike & Co.
- Vincent, J. E. or T. E. (1908). Pike, W. T. (ed.). Vol. 24. British Engineers and Allied Professions in the Twentieth Century. Brighton, Sussex: W. T. Pike & Co.
- Vincent, J. E. (1908). Pike, W. T. (ed.). Vol. 25. Hertfordshire in the Twentieth Century. Brighton, Sussex: W. T. Pike & Co.
- Pike, W.T. (1908). Pike, W. T. (ed.). Vol. 25. Northamptonshire in the Twentieth Century. Brighton, Sussex: W. T. Pike & Co. (Erroneously published as number 25).
- Coegrave, Effraim Macdowel (1908). Pike, W. T. (ed.). Vol. 26. Dublin and County Dublin in the Twentieth Century. Brighton, Sussex: W. T. Pike & Co.
- Pike, W. T. (1909). Pike, W. T. (ed.). Vol. 27. Essex in the Twentieth Century. Brighton, Sussex: W. T. Pike & Co.

Un-numbered volumes

- Young, Robert Magill (1909). Pike, W. T. (ed.). Belfast and the Province of Ulster in the Twentieth Century: Contemporary Biographies. Brighton, Sussex: W. T. Pike & Co.
- Pike, W. T. (1910). Pike, W. T. (ed.). Ulster Contemporary Biographies. Brighton, Sussex: W. T. Pike & Co.
- Pike, W. T. (1910). British Engineers and Allied Professions in the Twentieth Century : Contemporary Biographies. Brighton, Sussex: W. T. Pike & Co. (possibly by J. E. Vincent).
- Hodges, Richard James (1011). Pike, W. T. (ed.). Cork and County Cork in the Twentieth Century: Contemporary Biographies. Brighton, Sussex: W. T. Pike & Co.
- Pike, W. T. (1910). Pike, W. T. (ed.). Sussex in the Twentieth Century: Contemporary Biographies. Brighton, Sussex: W. T. Pike & Co.
- Pike, W. T. (1911). Pike, W. T. (ed.). Liverpool and Birkenhead in the Twentieth Century: Contemporary Biographies. Brighton, Sussex: W. T. Pike & Co.
- Hopper, E. C. (1911). Pike, W. T. (ed.). Norfolk and Suffolk in East Anglia in the Twentieth Century: Contemporary Biographies. Brighton, Sussex: W. T. Pike & Co. Reissued with Cambridgeshire as East Anglia, in 1912 (see below).
- Hussey, Fabian (1912). Pike, W. T. (ed.). East Anglia in the Twentieth Century: Contemporary Biographies. Brighton, Sussex: W. T. Pike & Co.
- Noble, W. M. (1912). Pike, W. T. (ed.). Northants and Huntingdonshire in the Twentieth Century: Contemporary Biographies. Brighton, Sussex: W. T. Pike & Co.
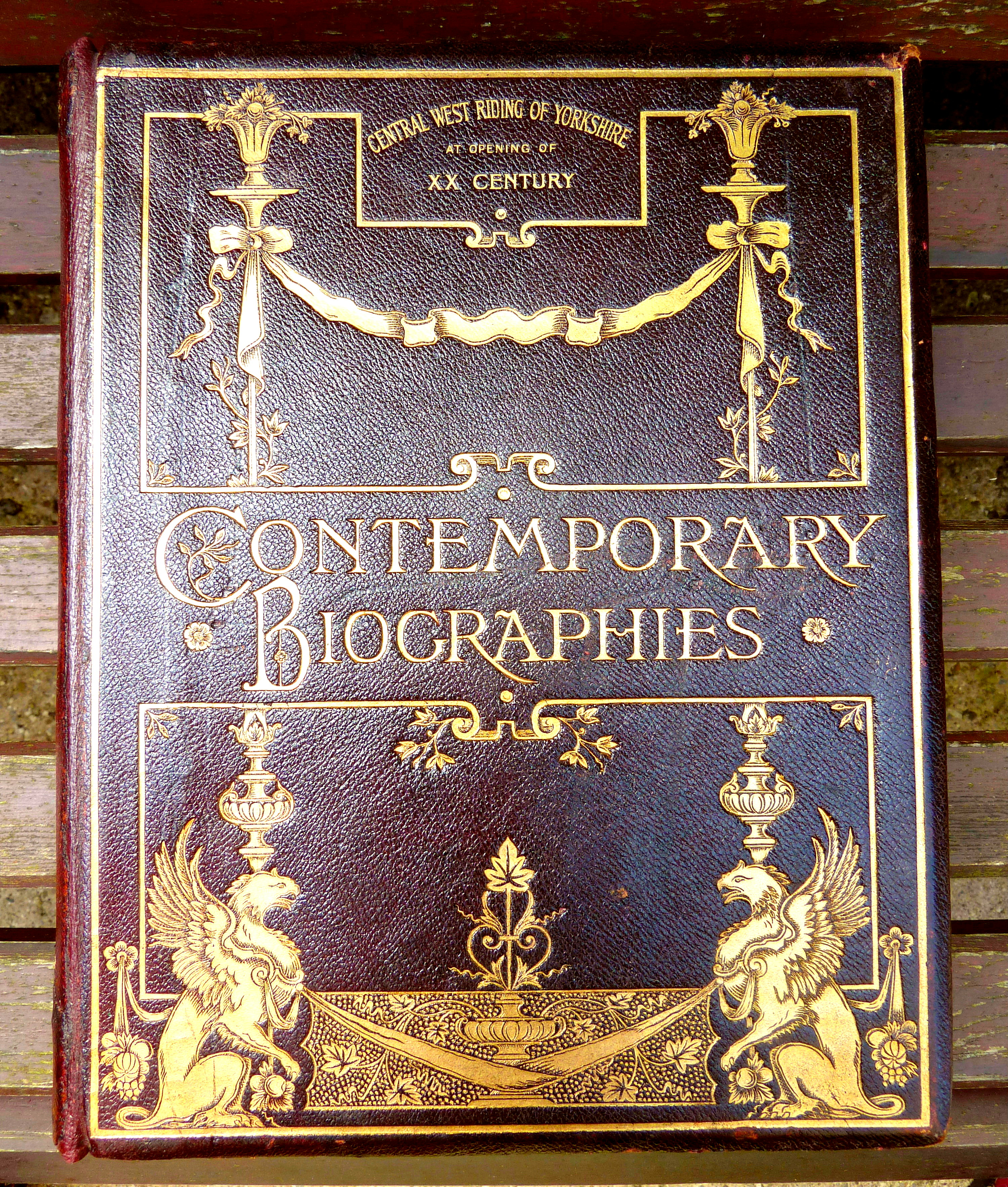
Cover of volume.6 of Pike's New Century Series

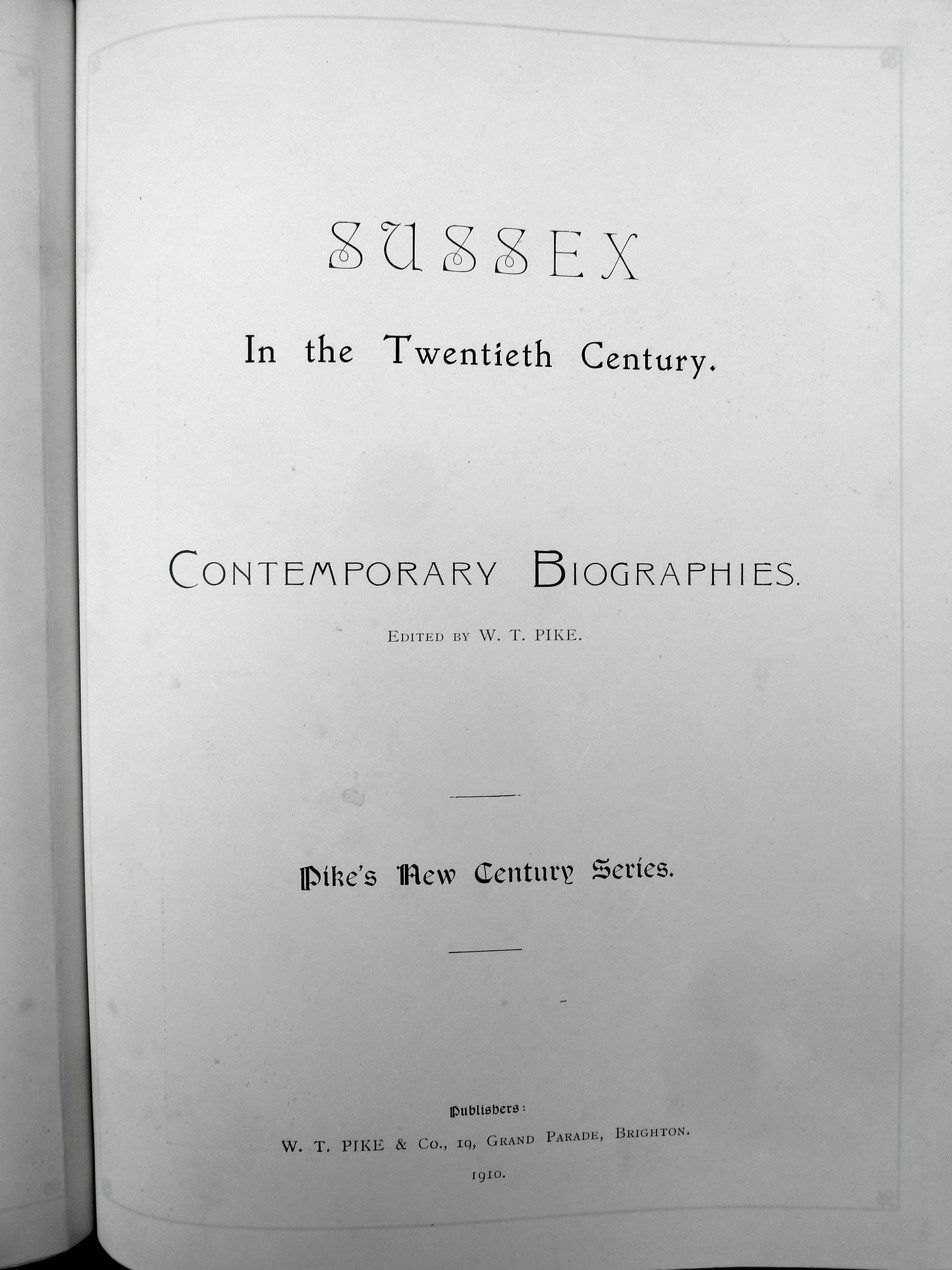
Title page of the Sussex volume of the series

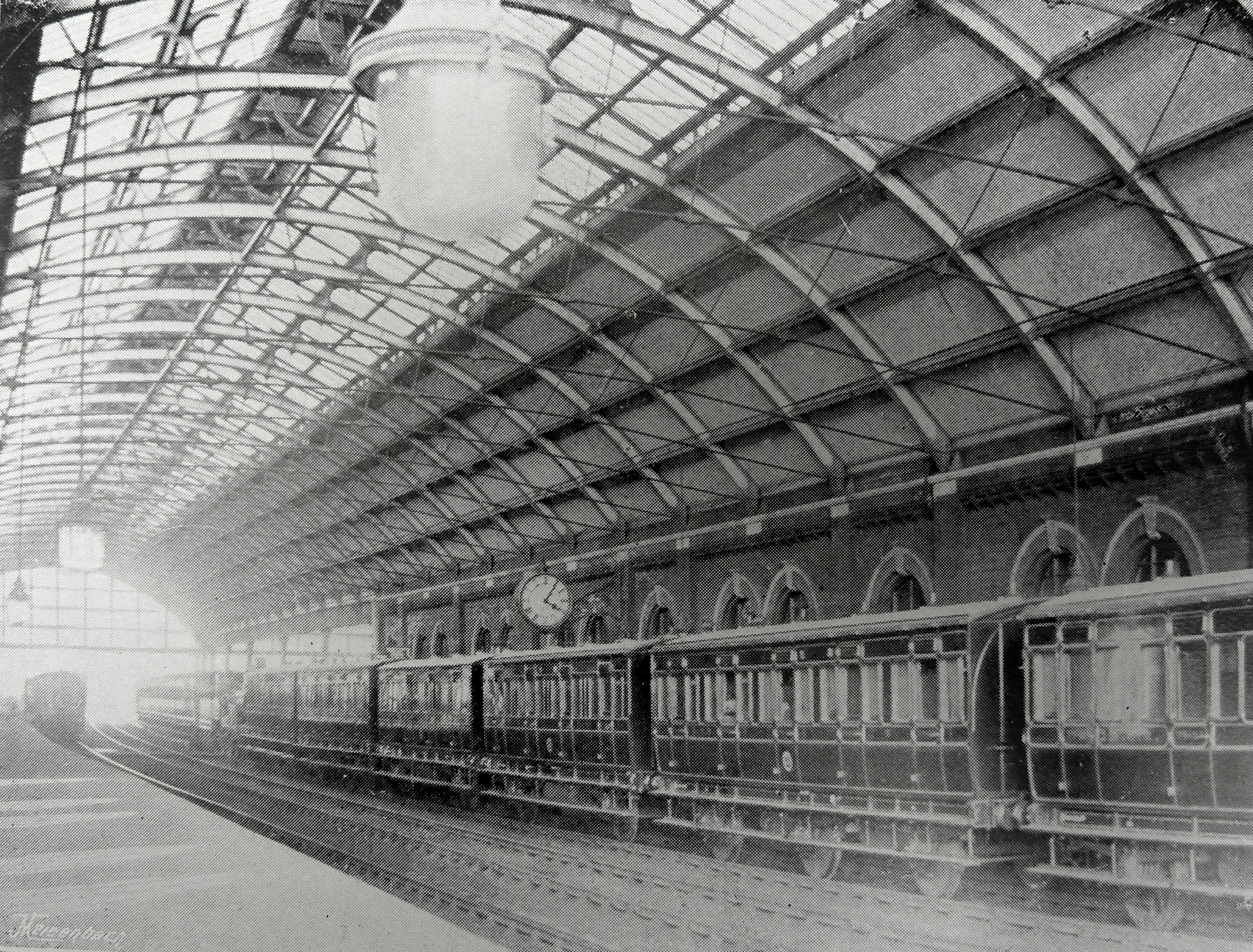
Darlington railway station from volume 17 of the series

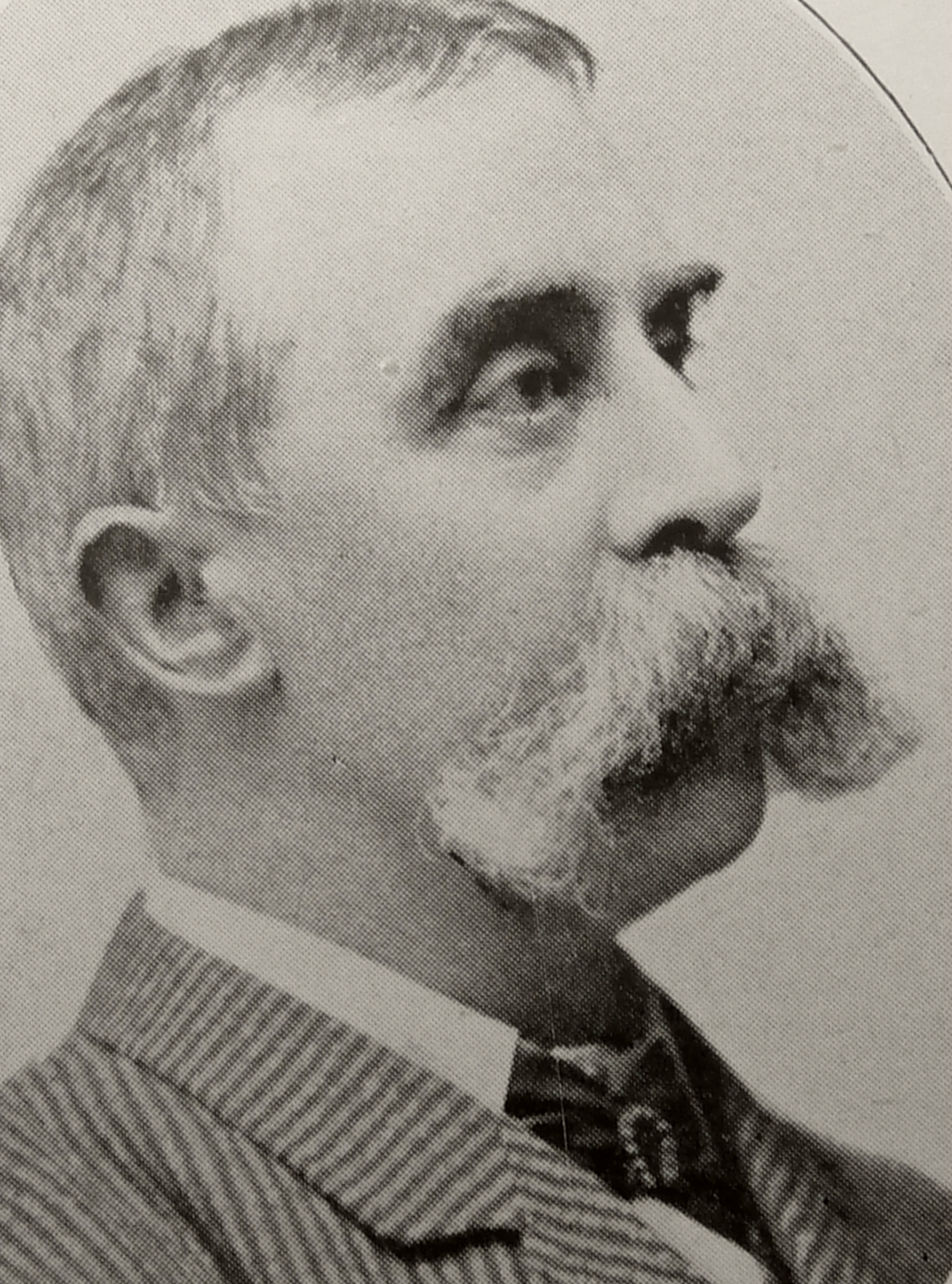
Engineer and shipbuilder Middlemost Wawn, volume 17 (detail)

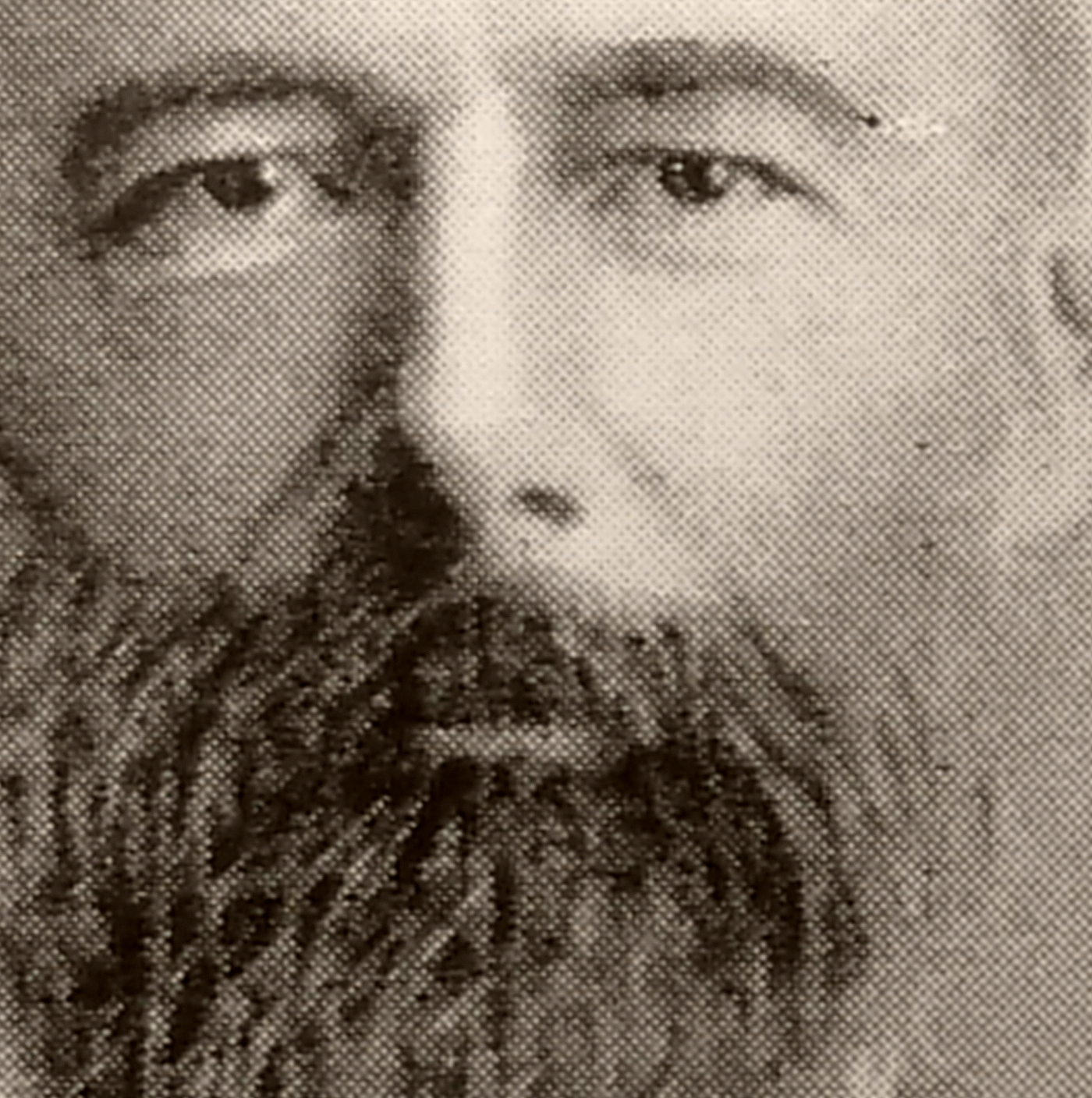
William Lionel Wyllie, volume 10 (detail)

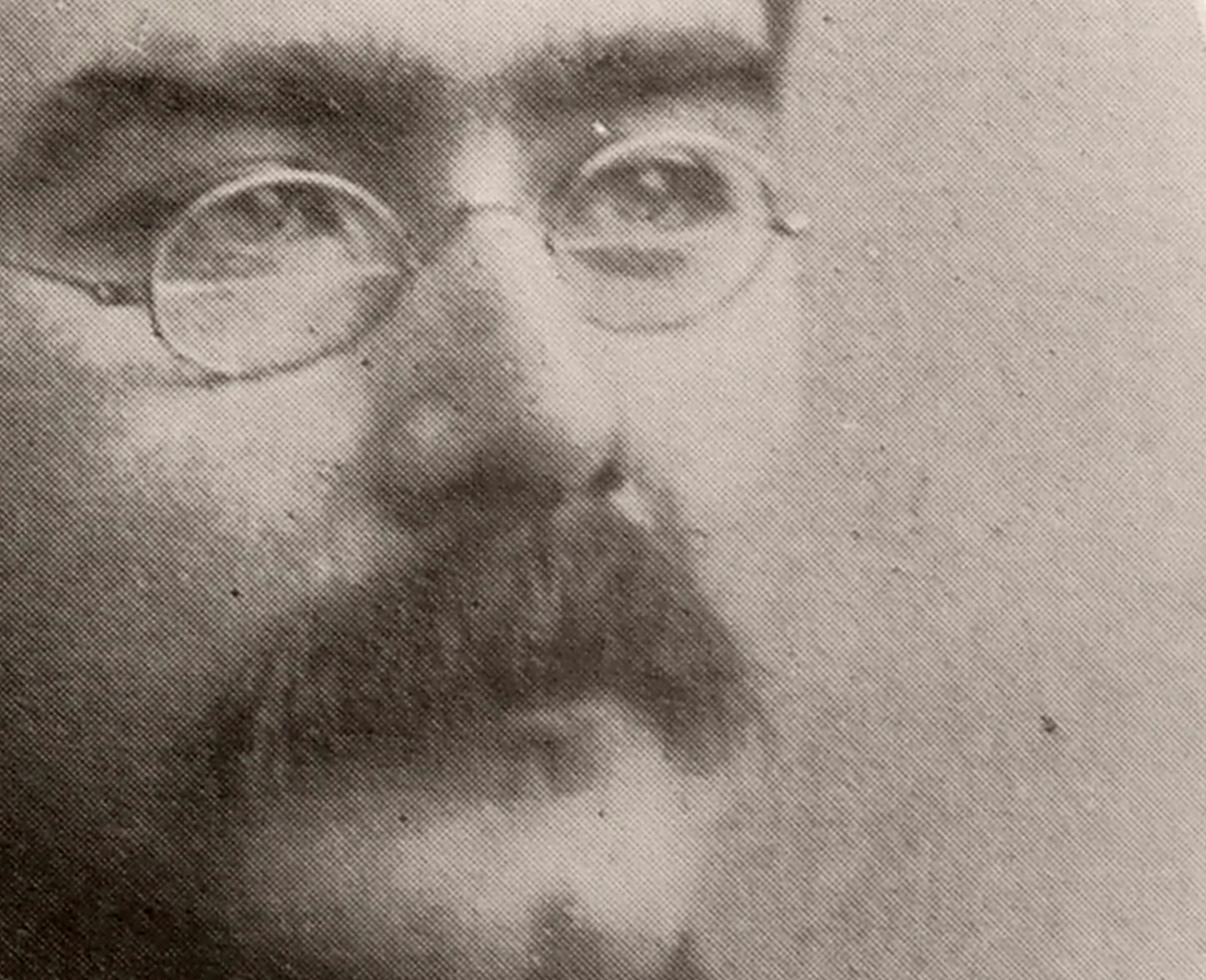
Rudyard Kipling, from the Sussex volume (detail)

== Other works ==
=== Books ===
- Pike, W. T. (1879). W. T. Pike's Hastings & St Leonards Directory and Local Blue Book. 62 Queen's Road, Hastings: Alfred Palmer. (published biennially or by subscription)
- Pike, W. T. (1884). W. T. Pike's District Blue Book, Weald of Kent and Romney Marsh Directory, 1884–1885. 62 Queen's Road, Hastings: W. T. Pike.
- Pike, W. T. (1889). Historical and Descriptive Guide to Hastings and St Leonards. Brighton, Sussex: W. T. Pike & Co. ISBN 9781241324551. (ISBN is a reprint).
- Pike, W. T. (1895). Folkestone Views and Reviews. Brighton, Sussex: W. T. Pike & Co. "Reprinted in 2010"
- Pike, W. T. (1900). Arms of the Municipal Boroughs of England and Wales. Brighton: W. T. Pike & Co.
- Berwick on Tweed. Brighton, Sussex: W. T. Pike & Co.
- Pike, W.T., ed. (1902). Mayors of England and Wales 1902. Coronation Year of King Edward VII. Brighton, Sussex: W. T. Pike & Co.
- Pike, W. T. (1911). Mayors of England and Wales 1911. Coronation Year of King George V. Brighton, Sussex: W. T. Pike & Co.
- Pike, W. T., ed. (1913). A Great Gothic Fane. St John the Baptist's R.C. Norwich. Brighton, Sussex: W. T. Pike. "Art canvas, gilt top, crown quarto, 310pp. 320 plates in colour and monochrome."

=== Journals ===
- Pike, W. T ., ed. (1913). "various". The Pictorial Record. Brighton, Sussex: W. T. Pike. "A monthly illustrated journal. Monthly local editions of this journal are issued, smartly illustrating towns and districts."
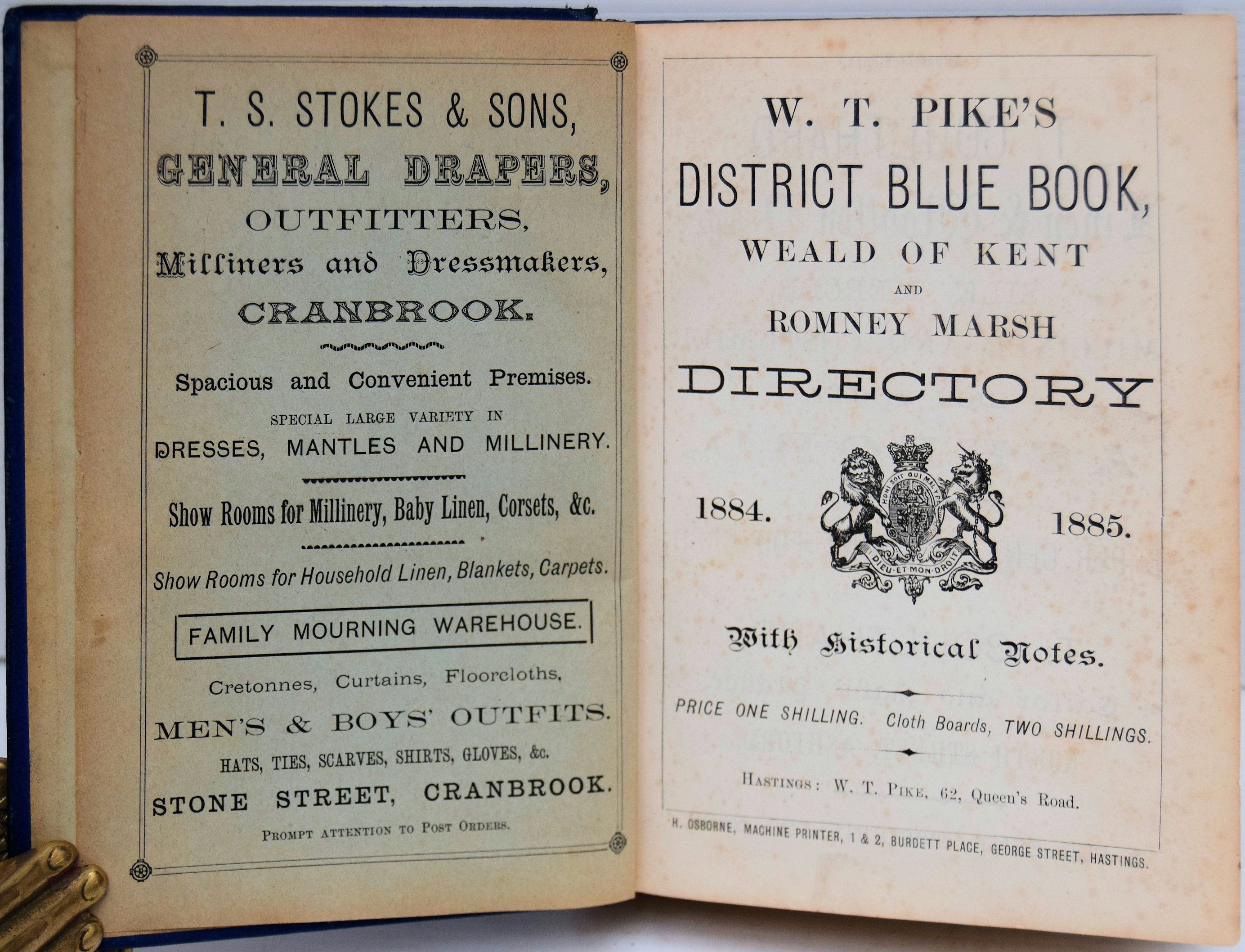
Title page of Pike's Blue Book - Weald of Kent and Romney Marsh, 1884

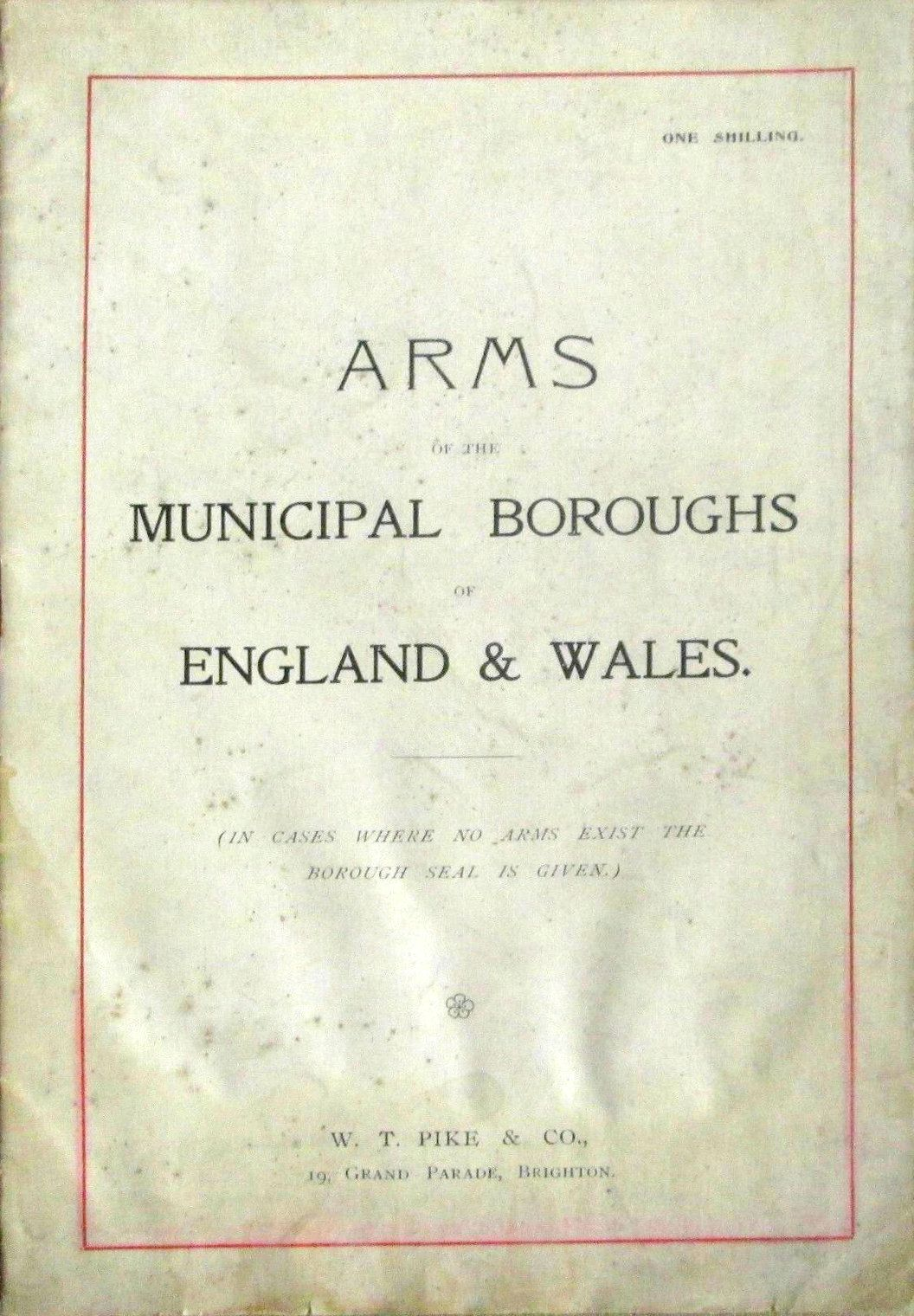
Cover of Pike's Arms of the Municipal Boroughs of England and Wales, 1900

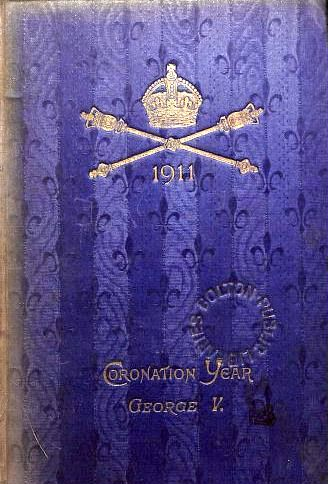
Cover of Pike's Mayors of England and Wales 1911
