= Sarah Jane Baker =

British transgender rights activist

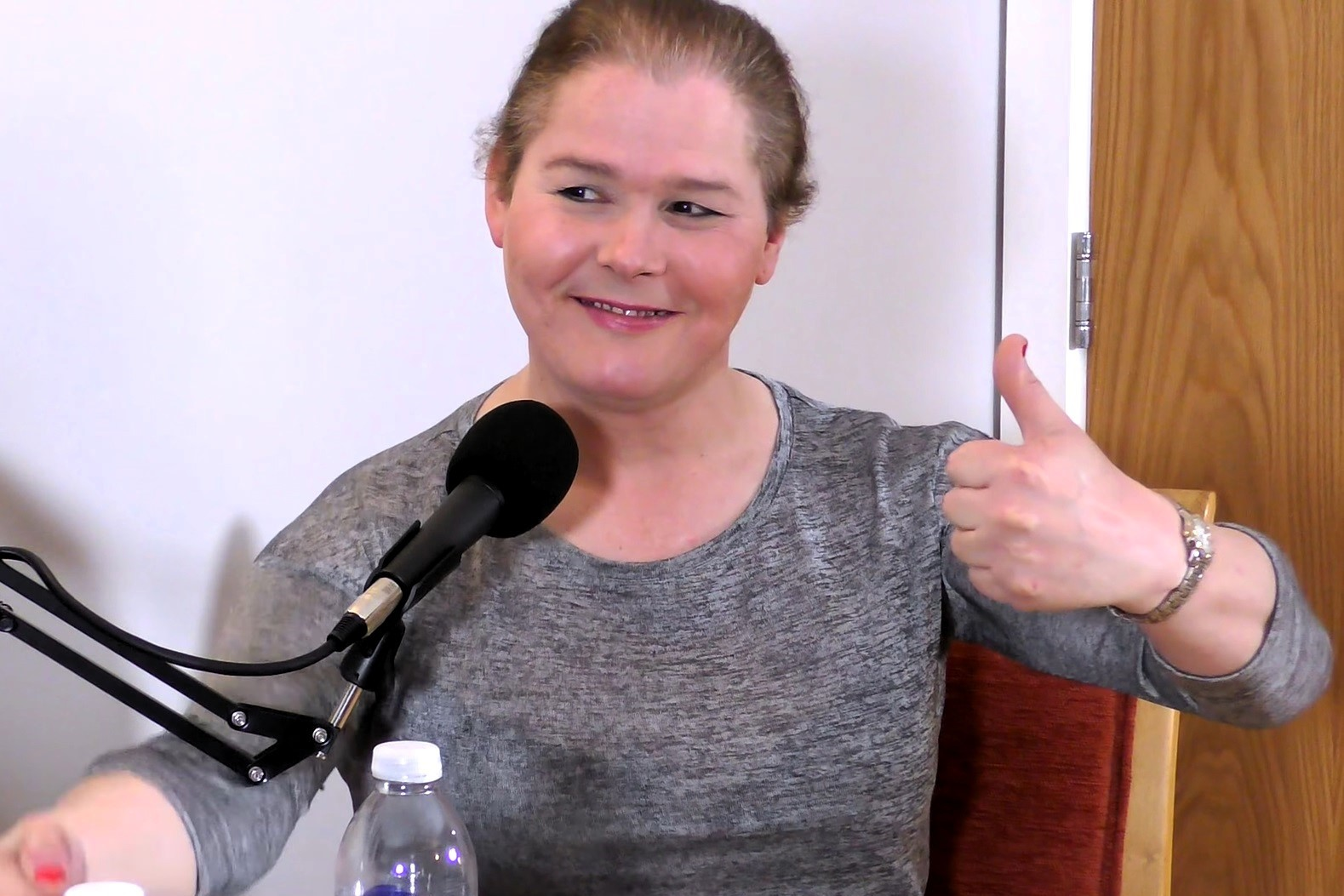
- Baker interviewed in 2020
- Born: 1969 (age 56–57); Brixton, South London, England
- Occupations: Transgender rights activist; author
- Known for: UK's longest-serving transgender prisoner
- Notable work: Life Imprisonment : An Unofficial Guide; Transgender Behind Prison Walls
- Website: web.archive.org/web/20231202194145/https://sarah-jane-baker.com/

Sarah Jane Baker (born 1969) is a British transgender rights activist, author and artist. She created the Trans Prisoner Alliance to support trans people in prison, and was the UK's longest-serving transgender prisoner at the time of her release.

She grew up in London in a large family and was neglected by her parents. She was imprisoned, initially for seven years, as a young offender for kidnapping and torturing her stepmother's brother, which was extended to a life sentence for the attempted murder of another inmate who, she said, had repeatedly attacked her. She escaped from prison in 2007, and was caught after three months.

Baker says she learned to read and write in prison; there she published two books and contributed to a third, and created artwork that was exhibited after her release. She served 30 years in 29 different male prisons, during which time she came out as a trans woman in 2013, and cut off her own testicles with a razor blade in 2017. After her release in 2019, Baker became a transgender rights activist and announced her intention to stand as a political candidate.

She was arrested after a speech at London Trans+ Pride in 2023, and charged with "commissioning an offence". She was found not guilty of the charge, but recalled to prison because she was on licence.

== Early life ==
Born in 1969 in Brixton, South London, Baker grew up in Camberwell, South London, in a poor family, where her father had numerous partners; she was one of 14 children. She alternated between living with her family and foster care. She says she felt like a woman trapped in the wrong body, and was regularly afraid of being battered on the streets.

In 1987, Baker's father remarried and in 1988 moved to Folkestone, Kent. The Baker children were often not welcome at their father's new home, and lived rough on the streets in London. In March 1989, Baker's father asked his children to trace their stepmother who had left home. Baker, aged 20, her 18 year old brother, and two teenage male associates went to the stepmother's family residence in Thornton Heath, South London, where they found her brother. They broke in, armed with knives, kidnapped the step uncle in a stolen van, and tortured him until he was released by police after almost 24 hours. In September 1989, Baker and her brother were sentenced to seven years imprisonment in a young offender institution, with their accomplices receiving six years youth custody.

== Imprisonment ==
The first of what would eventually become 29 different male prisons over 30 years for Baker was Feltham Young Offenders Institution.

On 12 December 1989, while Baker was being held at HM Prison Swinfen Hall young offender institution in Staffordshire, she tried to kill a fellow inmate with a garotte an alleged child rapist who Baker said had bullied her, attacking her three times previously. She was sentenced to life imprisonment for the attempted murder.

In 1994, Baker's 17-year-old brother was killed while walking home from college. In 2008, Baker wrote that she forgave her brother's killer and hoped that the killer would "sort his life out for the better", since Baker also considered the killer to be a victim.

In 1996, Baker began making art in prison; she could not get pencils because she had self harmed, but she paid for a cross stitch kit.

On 7 April 2007, Baker and another inmate who had been convicted of murder escaped from HM Prison Leyhill, an open prison in Gloucestershire, where inmates had minimal supervision. Baker's fellow fugitive was recaptured less than two weeks later, but Baker herself remained at large for about 100 days before being caught.

In September 2009, now in HM Prison Elmley in Kent, Baker wrote an article in Inside Time in which she said she loved prison. She called herself a "professional prisoner", and said that she had so much freedom from responsibility that she never wanted to be freed or paroled.

Another pen pal who befriended Baker in prison tracked down Baker's mother, who then visited Baker in prison regularly until her death in June 2013.

Baker spent part of her sentence in HM Prison Full Sutton in East Riding of Yorkshire, during the time serial killer Dennis Nilsen was imprisoned there (2003–2018). She writes that they played violin and piano duets, and the board game Scrabble, which she says Nilsen cheated at.

=== Books ===
Baker says that she learned to read and write in prison. While imprisoned, she wrote poems and short stories, published two books, and contributed a section to a third.

On 8 July 2013, writing as Alan Baker, she published Life Imprisonment : An Unofficial Guide. It was intended to be read by prisoners newly sentenced to life imprisonment, and comprised 41 segments explaining their journey. In a long Acknowledgments section Baker "most of all" thanks her son, siblings, and mother, and a To My Victims section includes a long acknowledgement of guilt and apology judged sincere by a reviewer. The foreword was written by Tim Newell, former governor of HM Prison Grendon. It won the Koestler Trust Silver Award, and was reviewed by academic journals about prison studies.

Baker's second book, Transgender Behind Prison Walls, in March 2017, writing as Sarah Baker, drew even more notice. It was written with the help of Baker's pen pal Pam Stockwell, who also wrote the foreword. It was published after Baker's public gender transition, and described being a transgender woman in a male prison. A review called it a supportive guide written with a generous kindness and well thought out suggestions.

Baker also contributed a chapter on the bureaucracy of gender transition in prison to Prison: A Survival Guide, in 2019 by Carl Cattermole. A collection of poems and short stories that Baker wrote during her incarceration was independently published as Borstal to Bedlam: Poetry & Prose from the Gutter to the Grave in mid 2023, in support of her during her re-incarceration and prosecution at that time.

=== Gender transition ===
Baker began her formal gender transition soon after publishing her first book in 2013, asking to be called Sarah. She continued to spend her sentence imprisoned in male jails. She says that after coming out as transgender she was stabbed and raped by other inmates. It was incorrectly reported in some newspapers that she had gender-affirming surgery paid for by the National Health Service at taxpayer expense. Instead, Baker says she was told she was not gender dysphoric and that she would first need to live two years as a woman outside prison. She was allowed makeup but not regular oestrogen for feminising hormone therapy until in her desperation to transition, she cut off her own testicles with a razor blade in 2017.

In July 2019, Baker was the longest serving of approximately 140 "out", or publicly revealed, transgender prisoners in England and Wales. 42 of these were in women's prisons, but not Baker, who was in a Vulnerable Prisoners Unit at HM Prison Lewes. The expressed stance of the Prison Officers' Association was that some inmates were genuinely gender dysphoric, others were "looking at it as a soft option for prison life". Baker wrote "if constant bullying, comments, sexual harassment and isolation are your idea of a soft option then I'd suggest you haven't really thought things through." When asked if she would have preferred a women's prison, Baker denied it, saying she liked sex with men, which she would never get there. After release, she wrote an article for Vice magazine about her experiences of love and sex as a transgender woman in male prison.

== After release ==
Baker was released on parole from prison in September 2019. Initially she lived in a bedsit, supporting herself by street performance on her violin and selling posters of her embroidery online. In February 2020, her cross-stitching was exhibited at the Brighton Museum & Art Gallery's "Queer the Pier" exhibit dedicated to queer history. In 2022 her art appeared in an article in Architectural Review.

By 2020, Baker set up an advocacy group called The Transprisoner Alliance to deliver support like letters and cosmetics to transgender prisoners. In 2021 she announced plans to contest the Richmond Park Parliament constituency on a platform of prison reform and opposing gentrification. She received Universal Credit, a supplement for low income, and attended many protests, including some to support her partner, a National Health Service nurse and Unite the Union representative. In January 2023, Baker criticised Prime Minister Rishi Sunak's blocking of the Gender Recognition Reform (Scotland) Bill. She led a protest at the inaugural event of gender critical feminist and philosopher Kathleen Stock's The Lesbian Project.

== Re-imprisonment ==
At 8 July 2023 London Trans+ Pride Parade, Baker gave a speech to the crowd where she said "if you see a TERF, punch them in the fucking face", a statement that was videotaped and widely distributed. Asked for their reaction, London Trans+ Pride organisers said that, "We do not condone violence. We do not back a call to arms for violence of any kind. We do condone righteous anger." Baker's speech was reported to Metropolitan Police, who initially stated that the call to violence was hypothetical, but after investigating arrested her on 12 July for incitement to violence. According to the terms of her parole, she was recalled to prison pending her trial, specifically to HMP Wandsworth, a men's prison.

Supporters, led by Baker's partner, launched a "Free Sarah Jane Baker" campaign online in July, and protested outside Westminster Magistrates Court in August. On 31 August 2023, she was found not guilty by magistrate Tan Ikram, after she said that she was just trying to get on the front page of the Daily Mail, and wished she could take her words back. As of 21 October 2023, she was still imprisoned, now at HM Prison Isle of Wight, and continued to be supported by protesters from the Free Sarah Jane Baker campaign.

According to the Free Sarah Jane Baker campaign, as of November 2023, Baker's oestrogen treatment has been stopped and she has instead been offered testosterone, which the campaign says "amounts to a medical detransition". The healthcare practice providing services to the prison said this was a "temporary measure while the healthcare team fulfils their duty of care to ensure that the benefits of any drugs we prescribe outweigh any risks".

As of May 2024, Baker was released from HM Prison Isle of Wight, following a probation hearing in March 2024.

== Bibliography ==
- Life Imprisonment : An Unofficial Guide, writing as Alan Baker, 8 July 2013, Waterside Press, ISBN 978-1-904380-93-1
- Transgender Behind Prison Walls, writing as Sarah Baker, Waterside Press, 15 March 2017, Waterside Press, ISBN 978-1909976450
- Prison: A Survival Guide, chapter on the bureaucracy of gender transition in prison, Carl Cattermole, 20 June 2019, Penguin Books, ISBN 978-1529103496.
- Borstal to Bedlam: Poetry & Prose from the Gutter to the Grave, mid 2023, AKA Press
