= Tan Ikram =

British judge

Tan Ikram CBE DL
- Born: 1965 (age 60–61); Taplow, Buckinghamshire, England
- Education: University of Wolverhampton
- Occupation: Judge

Tanweer Ikram CBE (born 1965) is a British solicitor and judge who currently serves as the deputy senior district judge (deputy chief magistrate).

== Early life and education ==
Tanweer Ikram was born in 1965 in the Buckinghamshire village of Taplow to Mohammed Ikram and Azmat Sultana. Ikram has described himself as coming from “a very ordinary background” as his father was a postman while his mother worked in a factory. He attended school in the nearby town of Slough. Later, he studied at Wolverhampton Polytechnic where he obtained his LLB in 1988.

== Legal career ==
Ikram was called to the Bar at the Inner Temple in 1990. He was admitted as a solicitor of the Senior Courts in 1993. He completed a postgraduate diploma in legal practice at Nottingham Trent University in 2003.

Ikram started as a magistrates' clerk and joined Booth Bennett Solicitors (later IBB Solicitors) in 1993. He became a partner at IBB Solicitors in 1997 and from 2007 to 2009, he was a consultant at ABV Solicitors.

Ikram was appointed as a Deputy District Judge (Magistrates' Court) in 2003 and district judge (Magistrates' Court) in 2009. In 2015, he was appointed as an associate judge on the Sovereign Base Areas in Cyprus. In 2017, he was appointed deputy senior district judge (Magistrates' Court).

Ikram received honorary Doctor of Law degrees from the University of West London and the University of Wolverhampton. He was appointed Commander of the Order of the British Empire (CBE) in the 2022 New Year Honours for services to judicial diversity. He has spoken out about what he sees as the problems due to the lack of ethnic diversity in the police and the judiciary.

In February 2023, Ikram was made a Deputy Lieutenant of Berkshire by the Lord-Lieutenant, Mr James Puxley.

Ikram was appointed to the Judicial Appointments Commission, a body which selects candidates for judicial office in courts and tribunals, for a period of three years from December 2023.

== Cases and controversies ==
=== Public comments on sentencing ===
In 2022, Ikram jailed former police constable James Watts for 20 weeks for sharing racist WhatsApp memes mocking the murder of George Floyd. Subsequently, Ikram publicly mentioned his sentencing decision, telling American law students at the College of DuPage that "This was a police officer bringing the police service into disrepute. So I gave him a long prison sentence. The police were horrified by that." In response, Lord Wolfson, a British barrister and former justice minister, suggested that as the Code of Judicial Conduct requires that judges must take care not to comment on cases which they have heard, Ikram's comments could be in breach of the code. Professor Andrew Tettenborn has suggested that, while Ikram may have been thoughtless in the terms he used when speaking in America about the case, the matter ought not to be subject to formal sanctions.

=== Police use of handcuffs ===
On 21 July 2023, PC Perry Lathwood arrested and handcuffed Jocelyn Agyemang because she refused to show a valid ticket for a bus journey although it later transpired that she had paid. Subsequently, Lathwood was charged with assault by beating. He was convicted of assault by Ikram. Rick Prior, the chairman of the Metropolitan Police Federation, said that "cases like this have resulted in a huge crisis of confidence" amongst police officers while Assistant Commissioner Matt Twist said that despite the conviction the Metropolitan Police was backing Lathwood. On 13 September 2024, Ikram's decision was overturned on appeal to Southwark Crown Court and PC Perry Lathwood had his criminal conviction quashed.

=== Trans activist ===
In 2023, Ikram acquitted Sarah Jane Baker, a trans activist who had told a crowd at a rally in central London that "if you see a Terf, punch them in the fucking face." This judgement drew some public criticism.

=== Hamas supporters ===
On 13 February 2024 Ikram, presiding over a case of three demonstrators carrying or wearing images appearing to glorify Hamas (the political and military movement governing in the Gaza Strip, and designated in the UK as a terrorist organization), found them guilty but let them off with conditional discharges, saying that "emotions ran very high on this issue". This judgement was subject to extensive criticism in the press. Unfavourable contrast was drawn to a 20-week sentence he handed down against the former police office for sharing memes mocking George Floyd.

It then transpired that Ikram had 'liked' an online posting by the pro-Palestinian barrister Sham Uddin condemning "Israeli terrorists in the United Kingdom, the United States, and of course Israel." The Campaign Against Antisemitism announced that they were therefore submitting a complaint to the Judicial Conduct Investigations Office about Ikram's judgement in this case. On the 15 February Ikram referred himself to the Judicial Conduct Investigations Office (JCIO) claiming that he had inadvertently “liked” the post.

On 11 June, the JCIO found he had not knowingly liked the post and that double tapping an image had inadvertently caused the like. He was, however, issued a formal warning for breaching guidance on social media use and making it known he was a judge on LinkedIn, resulting in "a perception of bias". The original recommendation had been one of formal advice, but the Lord Chancellor and the Lady Chief Justice increased it to formal warning, stating that "the judge’s actions caused significant reputational damage to the judiciary".

=== Mike Amesbury ===
In February 2025, serving as the district judge Tan Ikram handed Mike Amesbury, MP a ten-week prison sentence for assault. On appeal, while the original ten-week prison sentence was upheld, it was suspended and Amesbury was released.

== Personal life ==
Ikram is a Muslim and has written about the importance of focussing upon charitable giving and self-restraint during Ramadan.
