= Onion Pie Murder =

Murder in Chiddingly, East Sussex

The Onion Pie Murder occurred on 7 January 1852 in Chiddingly, East Sussex, England. The crime was committed by Sarah Ann French who murdered her husband William French by administering a deadly dose of arsenic to his meal, an onion pie.

== Sarah Ann French ==
Sarah Ann French was found guilty of wilfully murdering her husband, William French, on 19 March 1852. French was hanged for her crime in Lewes at the HM Prison Lewes in front of approximately 4,000 people, on 10 April 1852. Her execution became a huge event with some spectators even travelling by train to see it. French was the last woman to be publicly hanged in Lewes. Lewes decided to end public hangings because they were led to believe that French had been motivated to murder her husband with poison, as three years previously she had been a spectator at the hanging of Mary Ann Gearing, who also murdered her husband with the use of poison. They came to question that public sentences had no beneficial impact on society and that they should be carried out only in front of customary officers privately inside the prison, so as not to risk influencing others to commit the same crimes and ultimately meet the same end.

== Murder ==
French murdered her husband by lacing his meal with 3d worth of arsenic in Horsebridge. The arsenic had been bought by her husband in order to kill mice in their house, and he gave it to Sarah to put away in a safe place where neither their child nor anyone else could find it. The meal in question, an onion pie, was served to William French on Christmas Eve in 1851. That morning, Sarah French told his co-worker William Funnell that this was a rarity in his household and in fact his favourite meal, and not even days later William French started to show symptoms of illness and rupture. Sarah's motive for murdering her husband was so that she could marry a man named James Hickman, for whom she on many occasions (even before her husband died) said she had strong feelings. It was originally believed that Hickman had poisoned William French, however it became apparent after he testified against her that her feelings towards him were not reciprocated.

== Trial ==
On first inspection of William French's body and after an inquest held at the Gun Inn, the finding was that French had died from natural causes rather than from arsenic poisoning. However, further facts and evidence that came to light against Sarah French and her suspected involvement in her husband's death led to an inquest and then inevitably a trial so as to further investigate. William French's body was transferred to another coroner named Alfred Swaine Taylor to see if he could find any sign of foul play. He found a number of small patches of yellow colour which were then found to be that of orpiment. From these findings and the testimonies from the witnesses, Sarah French was found guilty on 2 February 1852 for the wilful murder of her husband William French.
