= William Thomas Pike =

British publisher

- Born: 26 January 1838; Hastings, Sussex, England
- Died: 22 April 1924 (aged 86); Hove, Sussex
- Occupation(s): Publisher, printer and editor, owner of W.T. Pike & Co.
- Years active: before 1898 – 1924
- Known for: Pike's New Century Series, 1898–1912

Signature
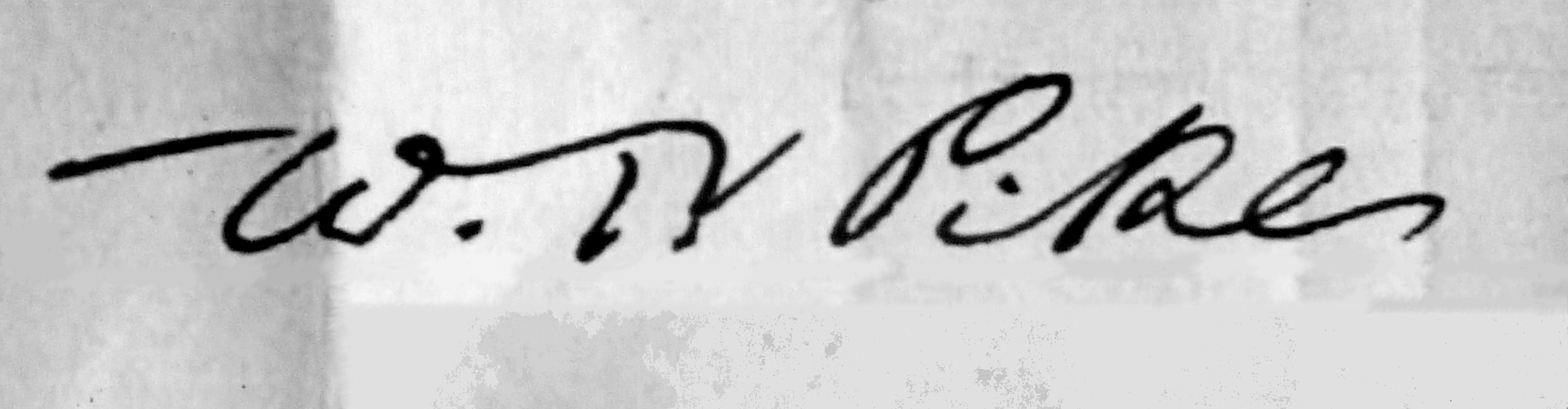

William Thomas Pike (26 January 1838 – 22 April 1924) was an English publisher, printer, editor and journalist. He is known for his publication of Pike's New Century Series of the Edwardian era. These are large volumes containing topographies of many of the counties of England and Ireland, and photographic portraits and biographies of many county inhabitants, from accountants and businessmen to bishops and aristocrats, but only rarely including women.

Pike had a modest background, beginning as an errand boy and tailor. His career as publisher, printer and editor was interrupted by imprisonment for embezzlement, but as a newspaperman he had friends. Following his release from jail he quickly revived his career, and continued to publish for many more years.

== Background ==
By the time Pike was born, his family of tradesmen was based in the south of England. His paternal grandfather was James Pike of Northamptonshire. His father was William Pike, a journeyman baker, and in the 1860s an agent for London Friendly Society, born in Earls Barton, Northamptonshire. (Note: William Pike (Earls Barton, 24 March 1805 – Hastings 1886)) His mother Elizabeth Pike née Butcher died in December 1841 when he was three years old, while the family was living in Camberwell. (Note: Elizabeth Pike née Butcher (Surrey 1815 – Camberwell December 1841). GRO index: Deaths Dec 1841 Pike Elizabeth Camberwell IV 37. She was buried on 12 December 1841 in the churchyard of St Giles Camberwell. Pike's mother Elizabeth is named in his birth certificate (see below)) Pike's stepmother was Sarah née Dowley, born in Hastings or London, the seventh child of James Dowley of Surrey and Kent, a corn factor who had the Freedom of the City of London. She married Pike's father in 1846. (Note: Sarah Dowley (Camberwell 14 December 1819 – Hastings July 1901). GRO index; Marriages Jun 1846 Dowley Sarah and Pike, William. Greenwich V 299. James Dowley (Southwark 29 June 1775 – Maidstone 1851).)

The eldest of eight siblings and half-siblings, William Thomas Pike was born in St Leonards-on-Sea, Sussex, on 26 January 1838. (Note: William Thomas Pike (1838–1924) GRO index: Births Mar 1838 Pike William Thomas Hastings 7 326. His birth certificate says: "1838, sub-district Saint Mary in the Castle. 26th January in St Mary Magdalen (district). William Thomas Pike. Father William Pike, baker. Mother Elizabeth Pike formerly Butcher. Informant W. Pike baker, of St Mary Magdalen".) At thirteen years old he was an errand boy, living with his father, stepmother and siblings in Croydon, Surrey. By 1861, at the age of twenty-three, he was living with his father and stepmother at 11 Shards Road, Camberwell, having been apprenticed as a tailor.

On 8 November 1869 at St Nicholas Church, Brighton, Pike married Emma Agnes Reading, who was then twenty-five years old. She was born in Brighton, the daughter of butler Joseph Reading. (Note: Emma Agnes Reading (Brighton 1844 – Brighton 23 January 1912) GRO index: Births Mar 1844 Reading Emma Brighton VII 320. Marriages Dec 1869 Pike William Thomas, Emma Agnes Reading, Brighton 2b 368. Deaths Mar 1912 Pike Emma A. 68 Brighton 2b 256.) They had no children. In 1878, they were living at 1 Elphinstone Road, Hastings. By 1881, Pike and his wife were living at 53 George Street, Hastings, with Pike's parents, and Pike was describing himself as a publisher and commercial traveller. The 1891 census finds Pike and his wife living at 100 Upper North Street, Brighton, with his mother-in-law and a servant. (Note: 100 Upper North Street, Brighton, can be seen on Street View.) He describes himself as a publisher of books. By 1901, he and his wife had moved to 19 Grand Parade, Brighton. He was working in the same trade, on his own account. The 1911 census finds them at the same address.

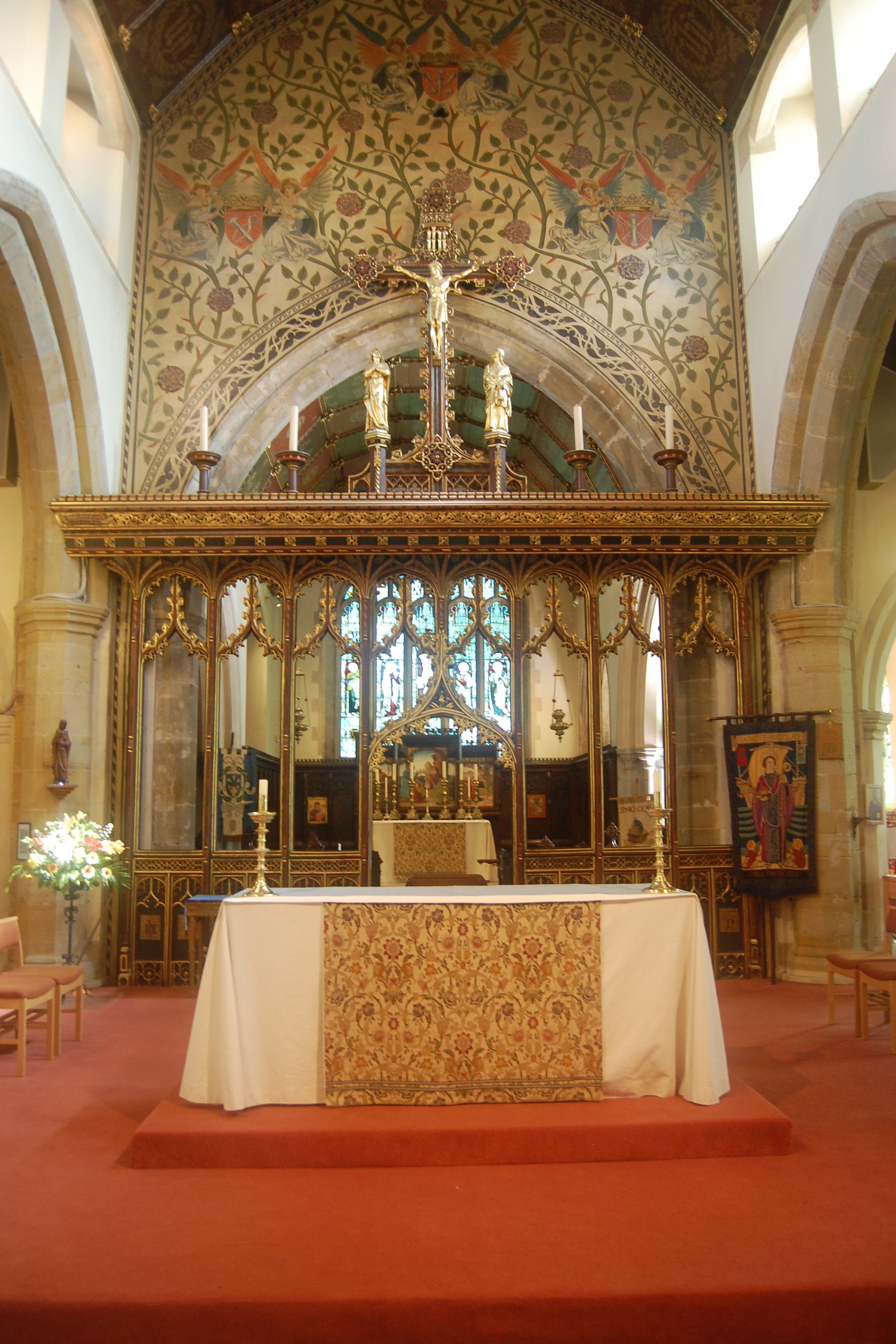
Interior of St Nicholas' Church, Brighton, where Pike married

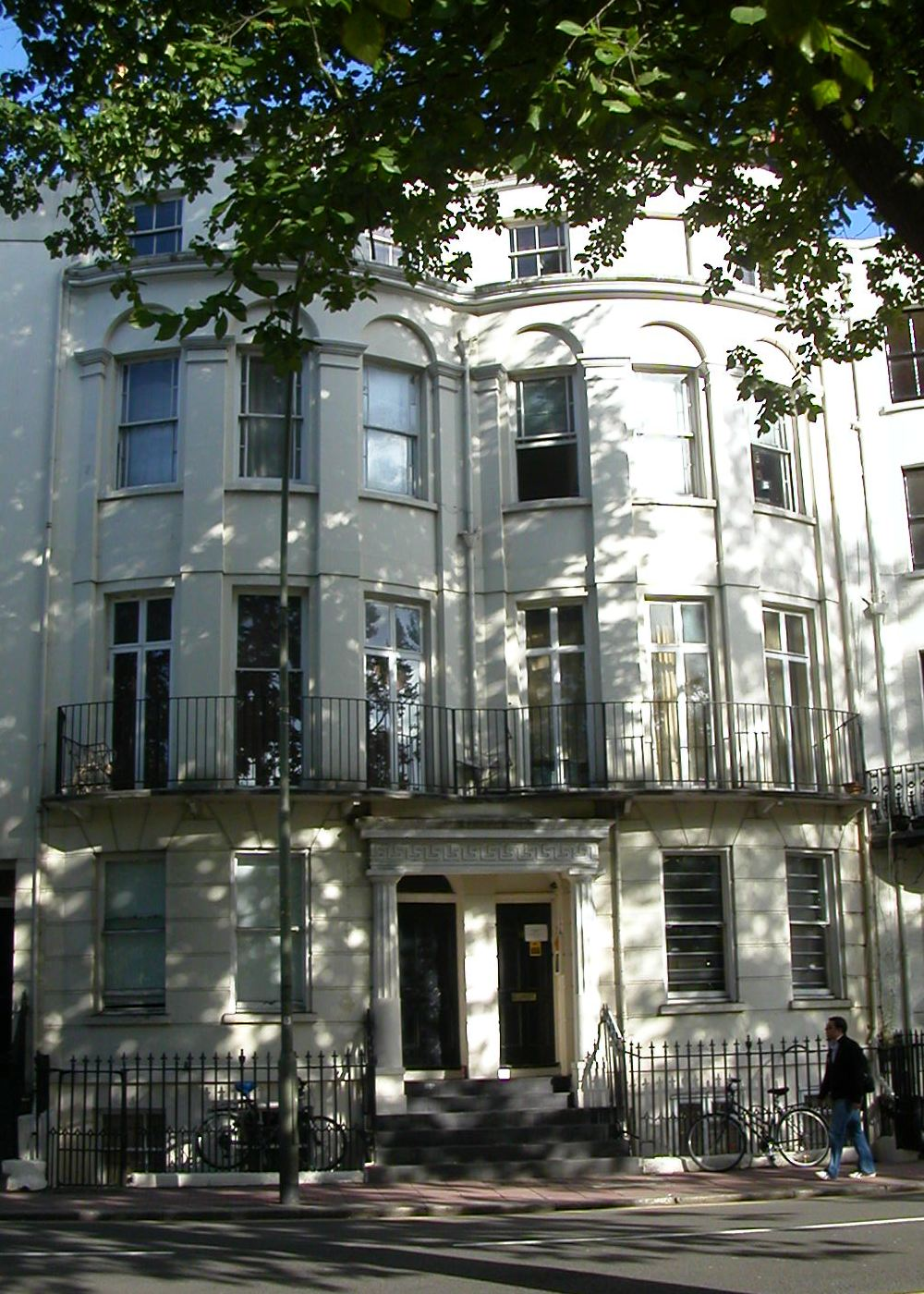
19 Grand Parade, Brighton (right), Pike's early 20th-century residence and business address

Emma Pike died on 23 January 1912. Pike died on 22 April 1924 at 47 Westbourne Street, Hove, Sussex. (Note: William Thomas Pike (January 1838 – 22 April1924). GRO index: Deaths Jun 1924 Pike William T. 87 Steyning 2b 333. 47 Westbourne Street, Hove, where Pike died, can be seen on Street View.) He left £138 13s 3d; (equivalent to £9,992.2 in 2023). His will was proved in London on 3 July 1924, his sister Fanny being named executrix.

== W. T. Pike & Co. ==
For some time until March 1877, Pike and his colleague John Ivimy were joint proprietors of Brighton Fashionable Visitors' List, a publication known as The List run by Pike from 1866, and the newspaper Hastings and Eastbourne Chronicle and Record of Local Events. Pike was publisher and printer, and his brother James was editor. "Some difficulties arose", when Pike and Ivimy were facing receivership, having been fined £50 (equivalent to £5,945.3 in 2023) in respect of a libel case brought by W. Kuhe in February 1877 against The List. The business was purchased for £735 (equivalent to £87,395.93 in 2023) on 12 April 1877 by George William Watts the junior partner and manager of a piano-manufacturing firm, J.B. Cramer & Co., in Brighton. (Note: Newspapers report various versions of the sum paid by Watts for The List, ranging from £700 to £750, but £735 is quoted in several sources.) Watts, a regular advertiser in Pike's newspaper, knew about the business being at risk of foundering, and took advantage of that.

Although Watts became sole proprietor, the business was at that point named for the first time as W. T. Pike & Co. On 28 May 1877, under a written agreement, Pike became manager, being paid £3 10s per week (equivalent to £416.17 in 2023) plus between twenty and fifty percent of net profits, by Watts, who also allowed him the use of accommodation above the works at 35 East Street, Brighton, in the town centre. Pike kept the firm's cash book, but was not permitted to handle cheques, which were to be passed directly to Watts.

On 18 December 1877, Pike "in a passion" gave a verbal notice to quit, because Watts had dismissed Pike's brother James from the post of editor, and Watts countered by giving Pike three months' notice to leave. Thereafter, Pike did no work for Watts, who claimed that his former employee was "playing billiards all day", so that a distress warrant was issued against Pike. He left in January 1878, after which cash-book discrepancies were discovered. According to Watts, Pike had been cashing cheques without permission, and had not been entering all payments from advertisers into the cash book.

=== Embezzlement trial and imprisonment ===
On 18 or 19 June 1878 at Brighton Police Court, Pike was bailed for £200 (equivalent to £24,519.3 in 2023) on committal for "embezzling and stealing the sum of £4 (equivalent to £475.62 in 2023) on 6th October, 1877, £13 18s (equivalent to £1,652.79 in 2023) on the 26th October, 1877, and £3 5s (equivalent to £398.44 in 2023) on 11th January, 1878, the moneys of his employer, George William Watts, at Brighton". He was tried by jury in a 6.5-hour session at the quarter sessions at Brighton Town Hall on 16 July 1878, convicted of embezzlement "with a strong recommendation to mercy on account of the prisoner's previous good character", and committed to 6 months' imprisonment at Lewes, with hard labour. When asked whether he had anything to say, Pike spoke in a "rambling" manner, claiming innocence and asserting that, "the whole of the book was not in his handwriting", and that he was "justified" in taking the money. "He concluded by forgiving the jury, and saying that he should not like to stand in Mr Watts' shoes". The sentence was explained by the deputy recorder as follows:

William Thomas Pike, you have been found guilty of this charge upon evidence which can leave no doubt on the mind of any reasonable man. If any other verdict had been returned, it would not have been a satisfactory verdict, but a verdict contrary to the evidence. With regard to the sentence, the Court can take into consideration the recommendation which the jury has made to the Court, and in which Mr Watts, the prosecutor, has joined. Any sentence which I should pass upon you would be felt to be severe to a man in your position. But on the other hand I must observe, in passing sentence upon you, that a man in your position knows perfectly well the consequences of his acts; and in the interests of society, I must remember that no business man in Brighton would be safe if such a thing as appears to have taken place in this business were passed over without due punishment. Looking at others, at the great confidence reposed in you, and taking into consideration the recommendation of the jury, the sentence is that you will be imprisoned, with Hard Labour, in the House of Correction at Lewes for the space of six calendar months.

There was "a sensation in Court ... The prisoner, who appeared dazed at the sentence, was then led from the dock". However, as a newspaperman, Pike had friends in and around Brighton. Another journalist commented:

Mr Pike, a gentleman well known in Hastings, Brighton and Eastbourne, received it heavily from the Deputy Recorder ... The case was a painful one. I have reason to believe that the prisoner felt confident of the prosecution falling through. And now! ... The man appeared dazed on receiving the sentence. And no wonder. In a moment, so to speak, the prospects of a life are blighted. Mr Pike was a smart business man, and might have achieved a satisfactory future through his enterprise and industry. But it is all over ... I say only that the issue is a sad one.

By January 1879, Watts was losing credibility, having begun various suits for libel and lost, leaving local newspapers free to comment negatively against him, his treatment of Pike, and his treatment of his colleagues in the music and entertainment world.

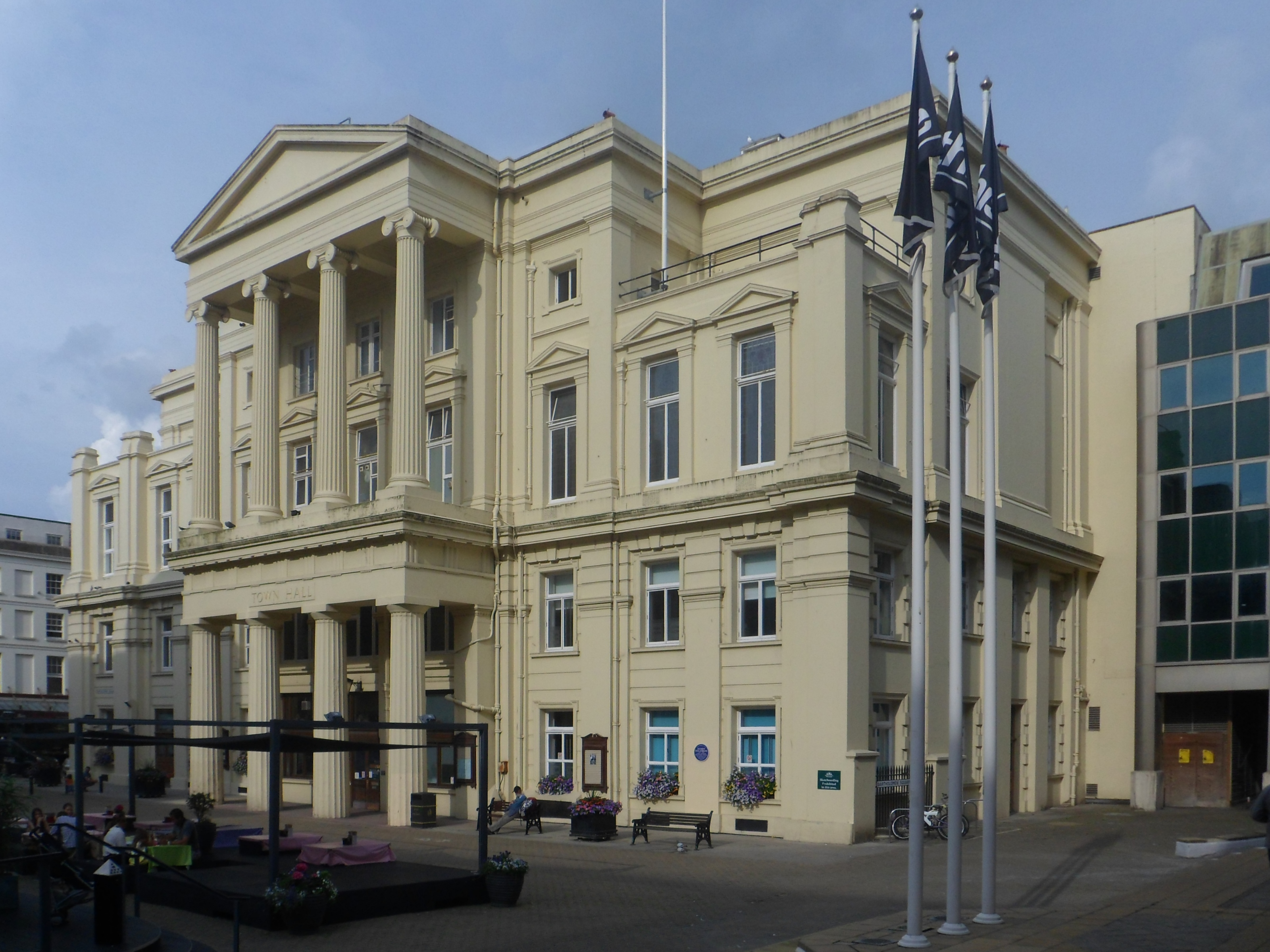
Brighton Town Hall, where Pike was indicted and convicted

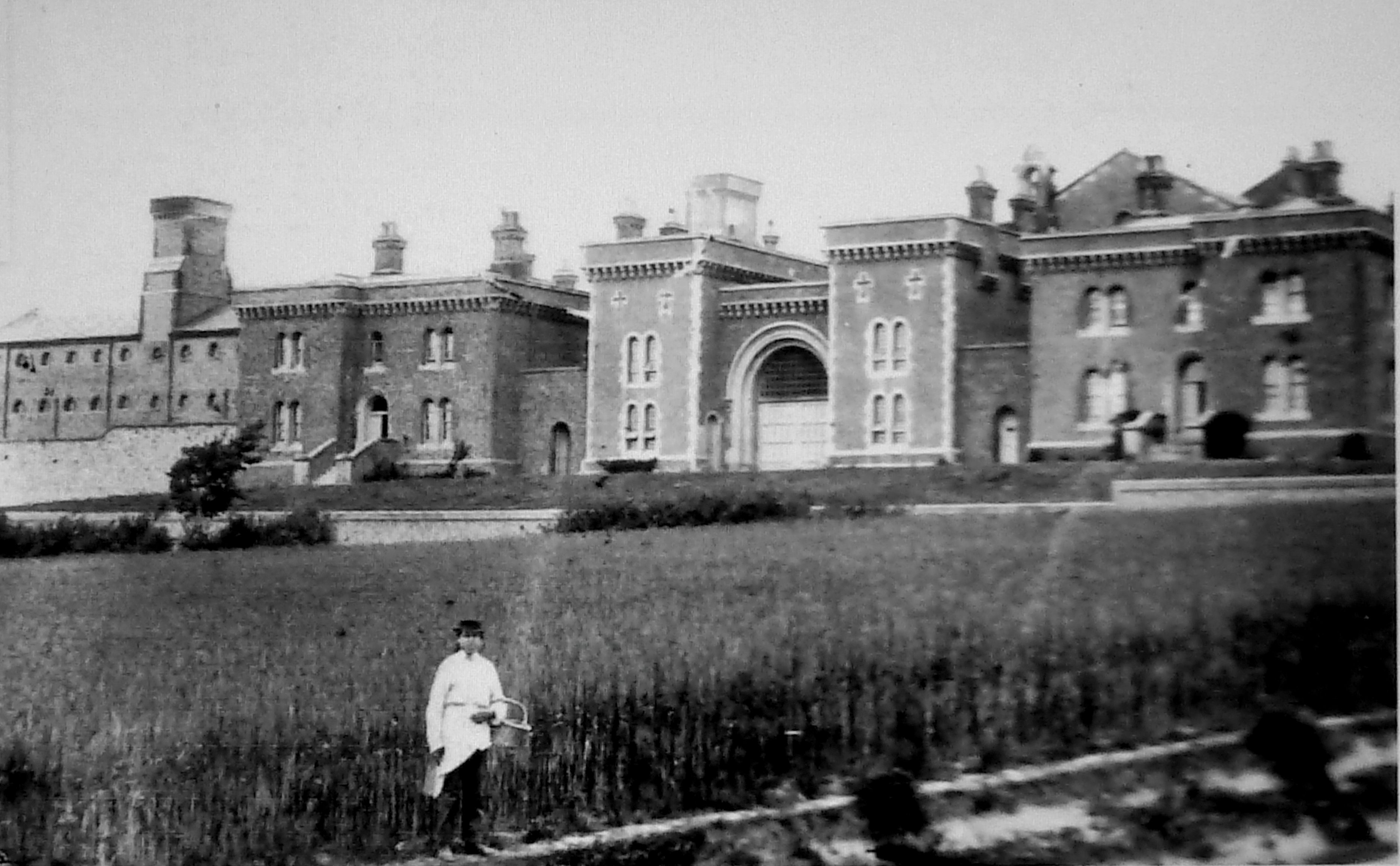
Lewes House of Correction, where Pike served his term

=== Re-establishment of W.T. Pike & Co. ===
Following Pike's release from prison, events made clear that it was not "all over" for him. A new publishing company was founded in Brighton, Sussex, as Robinson, Son & Pike. The firm was a "pioneer in the production of guide books and brochures for tourists, illustrated by photographs".

By August 1881, Pike had published his Directory for Hastings and St Leonards, 1881–1882, to good reviews, and it was not his first issue of that work. The Hastings and St Leonards Observer said it was, "in every way worth the money ... It cannot fail to be of the greatest use to tradesmen ... We have on previous occasions spoken very highly of this work, but the present issue is far more perfect than any of its predecessors".

The company was renamed as W.T. Pike & Co., and it expanded, with Pike as the proprietor. In 1898 Pike "hit upon a format for a national series", titled, Pike's New Century Series. The series was produced until 1912, and one source says that the company closed in the same year, the year in which Pike's wife died, and that the "premises were taken over by Garnett, Mepham and Fisher". Other sources show that in 1913 the firm had not yet closed; it was still publishing books.

== Pike's New Century Series, 1898–1912 ==
Pike's New Century Series, 1898–1912 is a series of quarto volumes, published at 19 Grand Parade, Brighton, and paid for by subscription. The first two volumes concerned the city of Bristol, which set the basic format of combining topography and biographies of noted contemporary figures associated with particular cities or county of England or Ireland. Named authors, and occasionally Pike himself, were responsible for the topography sections, Pike's team edited and expanded the biographies supplied by the subjects who were also the subscribers, and Pike edited the whole.

[The series combined] a text with the qualities of a high-grade guide-book, printed on art paper and copiously illustrated with half-tone plates, with an illustrated biographical dictionary, the whole bound in good-quality imitation morocco.

The local authors who contributed the topographical sections were sometimes "distinguished antiquarians", but otherwise those sections do "vary greatly in quality". The way in which the order of the biographical section follows established tradition, and its almost total exclusion of women, indicates the social hierarchy of the pre-First World War era. In the biographical section of each volume, the "lord lieutenant, bishop and sheriff" are first illustrated and described, with larger photographic portraits than the rest. Following those, there are biographies and photographic portraits of "the nobility and gentry, the gentry and magistrates, the clergy, the legal, medical, dental, scholastic, literary and musical professions, engineers, architects and surveyors, auctioneers, estate agents and accountants, veterinary surgeons, and businessmen" — in that order. The London volume includes a portrait and biography of the Lord Mayor of London.

The 1912 East Anglia volume was reviewed by the newspaper, Truth, in 1913:

Among those literary productions which appeal to parochial patriotism and the simple vanity of the undistinguished, is one entitled East Anglia in the Twentieth Century ... One feature was to be a full account of all the East Anglian churches, and another was to be the usual biographical list of celebrities. The price was £5 5s (equivalent to £656.55 in 2023). A subscriber interested in churches complains that so little space is devoted to them, while, on the other hand, the list of nobility and gentry is so complete that even the name of the manager of a Cambridge brewery, who is now a guest of H.M. prisons, is included in it. That is the worst of being a five-guinea celebrity. You never know who is going to share the honour with you.

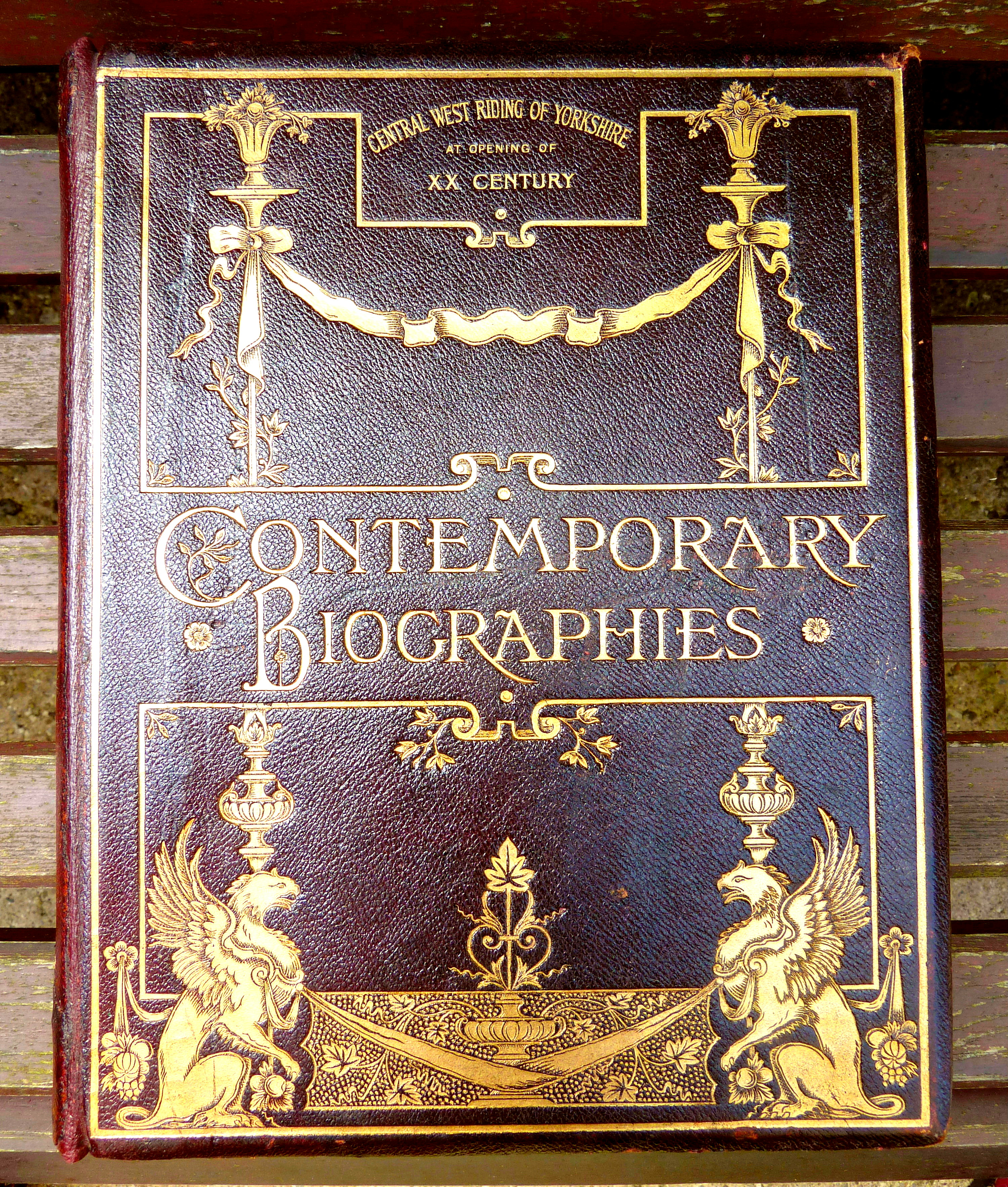
Cover of volume.6 of Pike's New Century Series

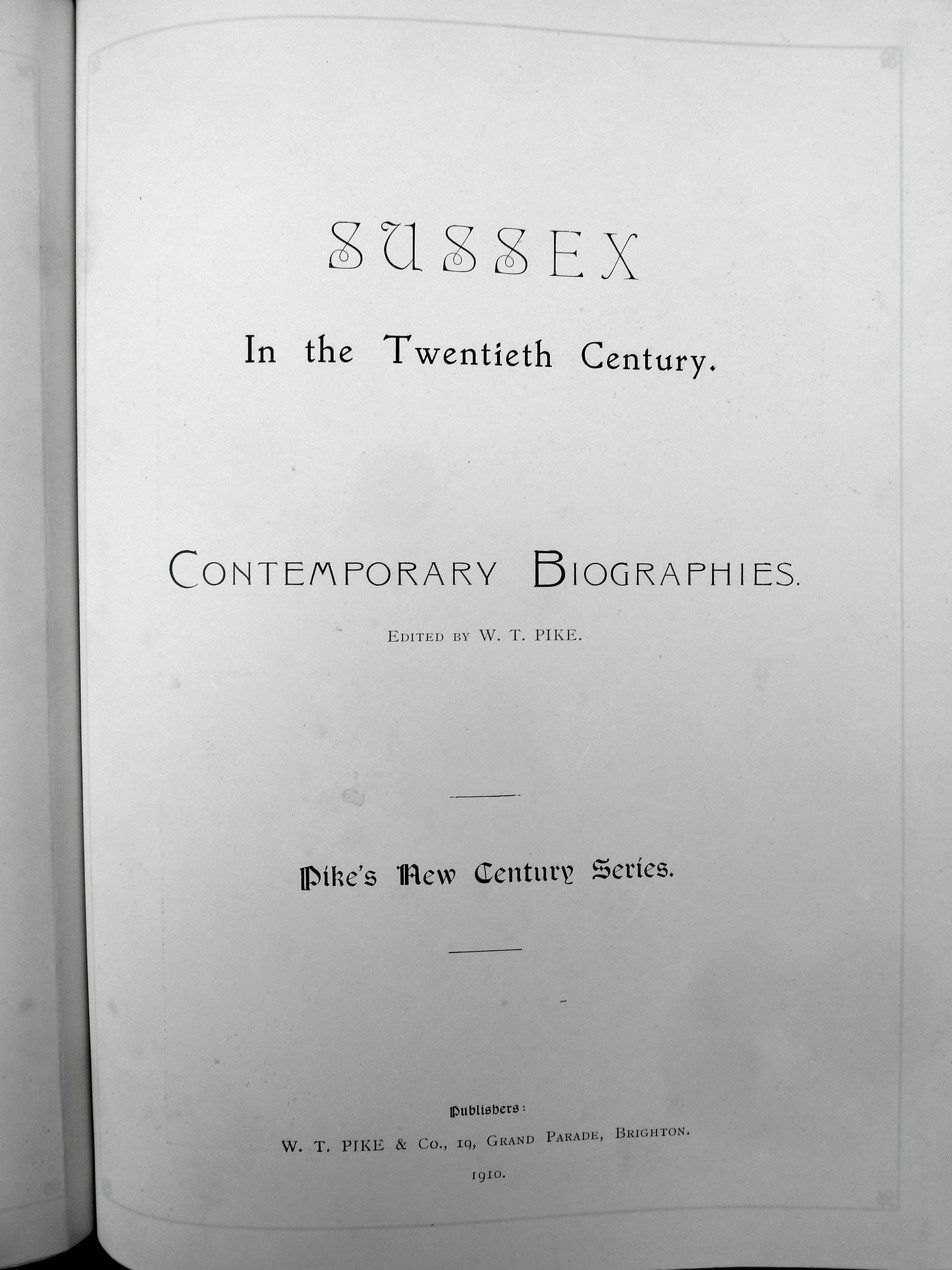
Title page of the Sussex volume of the series

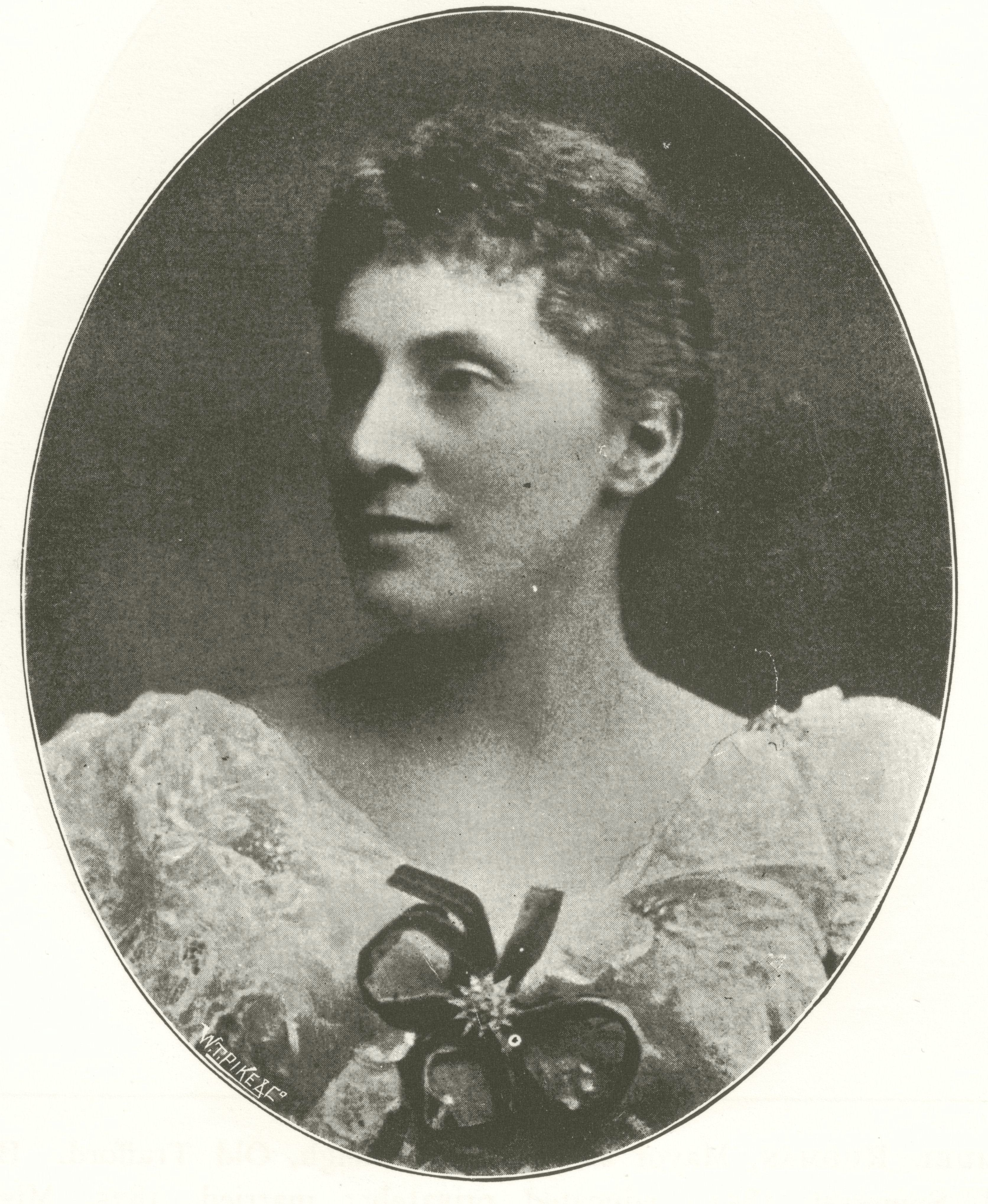
Eleanor Florence Vaudrey, a rare example of a female portrait in Pike's New Century Series
