= HM Prison Lewes =

Prison in Lewes in East Sussex, England

Coordinates: 50.8725°N 0.0059°W

HMP Lewes
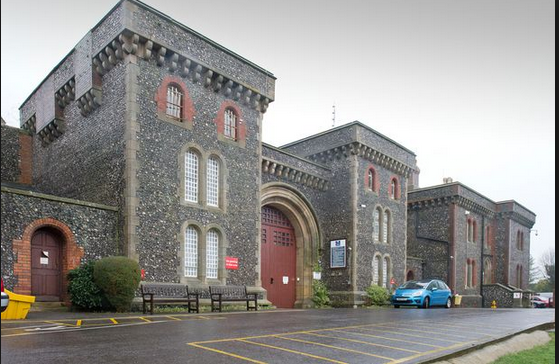
- Original 1853 front facade at HMP Lewes
- Interactive map of HMP Lewes
- Location: Lewes, East Sussex, England
- Security class: Young Offenders/Adult Male/Local Cat B
- Capacity: 742
- Population: 692 (June 2021)
- Opened: 1853
- Managed by: HM Prison Services
- Governor: Mark Creaven
- Website: Lewes at justice.gov.uk

His Majesty's Prison Lewes is a local category B prison located in Lewes in East Sussex, England. The term local means that the prison holds people on remand to the local courts, as well as sentenced prisoners. The prison is operated by His Majesty's Prison Service.

== History ==
=== Facility ===
Built in 1791 Lewes Gaol was situated at the corner of North Street and Lancaster Street in Lewes. Despite being enlarged in 1818 to hold 70 cells along with a treadmill, the gaol had become too small and was replaced by the present day Victorian prison in 1853. The gaol was sold to the Admiralty in 1853 to help house Russian prisoners of war from the Crimean War and demolished in 1963.

=== Prominent early prisoners ===
An early prisoner at Lewes was George Witton, a Lieutenant in the Bushveldt Carbineers in the Boer War in South Africa. He was imprisoned after being implicated in the shooting murder of Boer prisoners. While imprisoned in the UK from 1902, Witton wrote the book "Scapegoats of the Empire". After some time Winston Churchill, himself a former prisoner of the Boers during the war, put a number of parliamentary questions to the Colonial Secretary about Witton's ongoing incarceration. The campaign for his release was successful and he was pardoned by King Edward VII and freed on 10 August 1904. Witton then returned to Australia where he was welcomed as a hero by then Prime Minister of Australia, Alfred Deakin. The 1980 film "Breaker Morant" depicts the story of the court-martial and conviction of Morant, Handcock, and Witton.

In the wake of the 1916 Easter Rising in Ireland, several of its prominent figures were held at the prison, including Thomas Ashe; Harry Boland, Winifred Carney; Éamon de Valera; Frank Lawless; and Helena Molony.

On 10 April 1852, Sarah Ann French was the last woman to be hanged at the prison, for murdering her husband William French. The murder is known in East Sussex as the Onion Pie Murder.

=== Incidents and conditions ===
In October 2003, an inquiry was launched after 25 to 30 prisoners were involved in a riot that led to property damage and the injury of an officer.

In February 2008, an inspection report from His Majesty's Chief Inspector of Prisons stated that one wing needed to be refurbished urgently after inspectors found that inmates had to eat their meals on toilets. The report also stated that anti-bullying and suicide prevention procedures at the prison were weak. However, inspectors found that vulnerable prisoners felt safe and that the prison was decent overall. Two months later a new accommodation block for 174 inmates was opened at the prison, with a commitment from prison management to refurbish older wings at Lewes within the following 12 months.

On 17 September 2014, a prison officer was hospitalised with facial injuries following an attack involving three inmates who had been told they were going to be searched. This attack was one of 264 separate assaults on staff recorded since 2000.

On 29 October 2016 a riot lasting six hours caused damage to cells and offices, with prison officers forced to retreat to safety. Mike Rolfe of the Prison Officers Association blamed severe staff shortage and poor management. Rolfe said, "There were only four staff on that wing and all four retreated to safety after threats of violence and the prisoners went on the rampage." Two years previously, a serving officer said Lewes Prison "resembled a warzone" due to a severe staff shortage and drug smuggling. This was one of four riots in English prisons within two months, with riots also occurring at Birmingham, Bedford and Swaleside Prisons.

An inspection of Lewes Prison in 2016 found it held 640 prisoners and was overcrowded. HM Chief Inspector of Prisons reported over a quarter of prisoners at Lewes said they felt depressed or suicidal. Not all staff had anti-ligature knives and some, "could not assure us that they would act appropriately in the event of a serious self-harm incident."

On 28 March 2024, three inmates and three staff were taken to hospital after a suspected poisoning, with a further 10 people being treated at the scene. They quickly fell ill after eating a curry after a Maundy service. Ambulances and a CBRN incident support unit were sent to the prison at around midday and Eastbourne District General Hospital declared a major incident. The kitchen, staffed by both civilians and inmates, was locked down for some time before later being reopened after it was 'deemed safe'. The Prison Service said the initial assessment was that it was a 'food-poisoning incident'.

== The prison facilities today ==
HMP Lewes is a category B local prison in the town of Lewes, East Sussex. Opened in 1853, the prison has the capacity to hold 742 male inmates. Lewes Prison has held offenders ranging from 570 through to 590 through the courts of Sussex. There was an increase of recall to prison of offenders from police stations across Sussex because of the COVID-19 pandemic. (?)

Accommodation at the prison consists mainly of shared cells, with some single accommodation. A wing provides drug and alcohol support for 134 prisoners; B Wing is the Care & Separation Unit or CSU holding 16; C wing has 150 places for sentenced and unconvicted prisoners; F wing is a vulnerable prisoner unit and has 173 places for both unconvicted and convicted sex offenders and others requiring protection; L wing is the First Nights Centre for newly imprisoned / transferred inmates and has units for 23 while G wing is the Integrated Drug Treatment System (IDTS) unit for 22 prisoners. A new house block, Sussex, which accommodates L and M wings respectively was opened at the prison in April 2012. L wing and M wing have 80 and 94 places for sentenced prisoners respectively.

A £1 million healthcare suite opened in the prison in June 2004, with facilities to treat physically ill prisoners and a 19-bed unit for assessing mental health. The Health Care Centre currently has space for 9 prisoners.

The prison offers a range of full and part-time education including information technology, literacy, numeracy, and life/social skills, and has weekly library access for all. Additional employment is offered in the prison workshops. The prison has a Listener Scheme for those at risk of suicide and self-harm.

== Notable inmates ==
- Thomas Ashe
- Harry Boland
- Éamon de Valera
- George Edalji
- Richard Huckle
- Mick Jagger
- Reginald Kray
- Frank Lawless
- Khalid Masood the terrorist shot dead after leading the Westminster attack of 2017, spent time here after convictions of assault, GBH and possession of an offensive weapon
- Tom O'Carroll, pro-paedophile activist and convicted sex offender
- William Thomas Pike, imprisoned in Lewes House of Correction for 6 months in 1878 for embezzlement.
- George Witton, war criminal
