= Sarah Baker (singer) =

American blues singer

Sarah Baker (born September 17, 1943) is an American singer, songwriter, musician, bandleader and composer. Dubbed "The Voice" by music critic Phillip Elwood, she is associated with the blues rock scene of 1960s/1970s New Mexico and has been performing in the San Francisco Bay Area since the 1970s.

== Early life ==
Sarah Baker was born in Parsons, Tennessee, the youngest of four children. Her father took young Sarah with him to perform at religious song-circles in the surrounding towns. Baker started playing piano at the age of five and quickly gained attention for her singing voice. Trained in the classical tradition, Baker attended Union University in Jackson, Tennessee (BM, 1965), and performed during the summer seasons of Inspiration Point Fine Arts Colony in Arkansas (now Opera in the Ozarks at Inspiration Point), where she sang the leads in such productions as Così fan tutte and La traviata.

After seeing Wilson Pickett perform at the Psycho Club in Memphis, Tennessee, Baker's career path shifted from opera to blues and soul. She moved to New Mexico and toured the US with the Kaleidoscope Players musical repertory theater company from Raton, New Mexico. In Taos, New Mexico, she fronted Dolly and the Lama Mountain Boys and was active in the Lama Foundation (known then as the Lama Spiritual Center).

== Recording and performing ==
Signed as a solo artist by London Recordings in 1976, Baker bought out her contract because she did not like the direction her album was being taken. Her feminist stance to walk away from a recording contract was revolutionary. "Not only am I a singer, I'm a producer, bandleader, songwriter and keyboardist ... I've had male producers before, but I wanted to get across my own vision from a woman's point of view, not a producer's vision of who I am." She became an independent recording artist, releasing albums with Take One Records (WBBH, 1981); Firenze (Sarah Baker, 1989; Maybe Someday with Charlie Musselwhite, 1995; Baker's Dozen, 2019) and appearing on five compilation albums with Jackalope Records including The Songs of Hank Williams, 2019; and the Sonoma County Covers Project, 2015). Phil Elwood wrote of hearing Baker: "Here is a voice, I decided; 90 minutes later, after almost 2 sets, I was even more enthusiastic — Here is a magnificent voice... Her band has a cohesive ensemble sound that provides a fine setting for The Voice."

Performing in various incarnations of the Sarah Baker Band from the 1970s to the present, Baker has opened for many notable soul, blues and rock artists including Dr. John, John Mayall, Charles Brown, John Lee Hooker, Taj Mahal, Huey Lewis and the News, Rory Block, Lou Rawls, Johnny Rawls and Tom Petty and the Heartbreakers Her band has served as a training ground for musicians who have gone on to play with RatDog (Mark Karan), Sammy Hagar (Mona Gnader), and Tommy Castro (the late Billy Lee Lewis).

== Academics and teaching ==
In 1992, Baker re-focused her energy into academic pursuits, studying the intersections of music and literature for her MFA from Sonoma State University (1998) and her PhD from Union Institute & University (2002). She was a lecturer at SSU from 2002-2013 and is currently a private coach for recording artists and actors.

== Composing ==
Baker began composing in 1999, performing String Theories string quartet at the 12th Annual International Virginia Woolf Society Conference. She was the musical arranger and conductor for the musical Glass Slipper Blues in 2000 and wrote and performed the score for the Syringa Cinema film, I Married the War (2021).

== Later career ==
In 2018, Baker organized a fundraiser for musicians who were victims of the California wildfires. The resulting CD compilation, Out of the Fire, produced by Baker, Allen Sudduth, and Mooka Rennick, including the title track by Baker, was released by Prairie Sun Recording Studios, where she recorded her latest album. "It's a labor of love, and we hope that we can really help people", Baker said. "Not everything gets covered by insurance, and musical instruments are expensive. We just hope we can make a difference."

== Discography ==
=== Albums ===
- WBBH (Take One Records, 1981) WBBH was Peter Welker, Sarah Baker, Michael Barclay, Tim Haggerty
- Sarah Baker (Firenze, 1989)
- Maybe Someday, featuring Charlie Musselwhite (Firenze, 1995)
- String Theories (Jaxon's Press, 2014)
- Dolly and the Lama Mountain Boys (Jaxon's Press, 2015)
- Baker's Dozen (Firenze/Venus, 2019)
- I Married the War (Firenze/Venus, 2022)

=== Compilation tracks ===
- Hot Ribs (Rib Records, 1980). Track B2: "I Just Want to Believe"; Track B3: "Confessions"
- Connections (Jackalope Records,1996). "Heal These Blues"
- Sonoma County Covers Project (CD Baby, 2015). Track 14: "On a Country Night" by Stu Blank - Sarah Baker with Al Garth
- Out of the Fire (Prairie Sun Recordings, 2018), Co-producer. Track 1: (Title Track) "Out of the Fire"; Track 4: "You're Not Alone"
- The Songs of Hank Williams (Jackalope Records, 2019). Track 10, Disc 2: "Take these Chains" – Sarah Baker with Al Garth
