= Hagan (surname) =

Hagan is an originally Irish surname related linguistically to Hogan (see details on that page).

Notable people with the surname include:

- Alexandra Hagan (born 1991), Australian rower
- Alfie Hagan (1895–1980), English footballer
- Art Hagan (1863–1936), American baseball player
- Barry Hagan (1957–1993), American figure skater
- Bill Hagan (born 1931), Canadian ice hockey player
- Billy Hagan (disambiguation), multiple people
- Bo Hagan (1925–2002), American football and baseball player
- Bob Hagan (born 1949), American politician
- Bob Hagan (rugby league) (1940–2025), Australian rugby league footballer and coach
- Brian Hagan, American artist
- Charles Hagan (born 2001), English footballer
- Chris Hagan (born 1989), American basketball player
- Christina Hagan (born 1988), American politician
- Cliff Hagan (1931–2026), American basketball player
- Cliona Hagan (born 1989), Irish singer
- Darian Hagan (born 1970), American football player
- David Hagan, American business executive
- David Hagan (cricketer) (born 1966), English cricketer
- Derek Hagan (born 1984), American football player
- Ebenezer Hagan (born 1975), Ghanaian footballer
- Edward Hagan (disambiguation), multiple people
- Ellen Hagan, Ghanaian entrepreneur
- Emmanuel Hagan (born 2000), Ghanaian footballer
- Fred Hagan (1918–2003), Canadian artist
- George Hagan (disambiguation), multiple people
- Glenn Hagan (born 1955), American basketball player
- Helen Eugenia Hagan (1891–1964), American pianist
- Helene Hagan (born 1939), American anthropologist
- Holly Hagan (born 1992), British television personality
- Holly Hagan (epidemiologist), American epidemiologist
- Jacqueline Hagan (born 1954), American sociologist
- James Hagan (disambiguation), multiple people
- Javon Hagan (born 1997), American football player
- Jean Hagen (1923–1977), American actress
- Jim Hagan (born 1956), Northern Irish footballer
- Jim Hagan (basketball) (1938–2021), American basketball player
- Jimmy Hagan (1918–1998), English footballer
- John Hagan (disambiguation), multiple people
- Joseph Hagan, American politician
- Joseph Essilfie Hagan (1912–??), Ghanaian politician
- Kay Hagan (1953–2019), American politician
- Kenneth J. Hagan, American historian
- Kevin Hagan (1928–2005), New Zealand footballer
- Kobina Hagan (1923–1977), Ghanaian politician
- Lyn Hagan, British writer and artist
- Mallory Hagan (born 1988), American politician
- Marianne Hagan (born 1966), American actress
- Matt Hagan (born 1982), American race car driver
- Maura Hagan, American professor
- Michael Hagan (born 1964), Australian rugby league footballer
- Molly Hagan (born 1961), American actress
- Patrick Hagan (1879–1916), Scottish footballer
- Peter Monroe Hagan (1871–1930), American sheriff
- Priscilla Hagan (born 1996), Ghanaian footballer
- Robert Hagan (disambiguation), multiple people
- Sarah Hagan (born 1984), American actress
- Stephen Hagan (disambiguation), multiple people
- Susannah Hagan (born 1951), English researcher
- Thomas Hagan (born 1941), American assassin
- Tim Hagan (born 1946), American politician
- Tom Hagan (born 1947), American basketball player
- Willie J. Hagan, American academic administrator

== See also ==
- Senator Hagan (disambiguation)
- Mary Hagan-Harrell, American politician
- O'Hagan, an Irish surname
- Hagans, another surname
