= Towneley =

Towneley is a surname, and may refer to:

== People ==
=== The Towneley family of England ===
- Charles Townley (1 October 1737 – 3 January 1805[1]), British antiquary
- Caroline Theresa Towneley (1838–1873), British heiress
- Charles Towneley (MP) (1803–1870), Irish Independent Irish Party and Whig politician
- Francis Towneley (1709–1746), English Catholic and Jacobite
- Henry Towneley Green (1836–1899), English watercolourist and illustrator
- John Towneley (politician) (1806–1878), English Whig politician
- John Towneley (translator) (1697–1782), English supporter of the Jacobite Rising of 1745
- Montagu Towneley-Bertie, 13th Earl of Lindsey (2 November 1887 – 11 September 1963), English peer
- Richard de Towneley (MP) (c. 1313 – 16 April 1381), English landowner and politician
- Richard Towneley (1629–1707), English mathematician, natural philosopher and astronomer
- Simon Towneley (1921–2022), British author

==== Barons O'Hagan ====
- Baron O'Hagan (the title)
- Thomas O'Hagan, Baron O'Hagan (1812–1885)
  who married in 1871 Alice Towneley, daughter and co-heiress of Colonel Charles Towneley, from whom his heirs take the name
- Thomas Towneley O'Hagan, 2nd Baron O'Hagan (5 December 1878 – 13 December 1900)
- Maurice Towneley-O'Hagan, 3rd Baron O'Hagan (20 February 1882 – 18 December 1961)
- Charles Towneley Strachey, 4th Baron O'Hagan (b. 1945)

== Places and institutions ==
- Mary Towneley Loop, a circular route along the border of Lancashire and Yorkshire
- Towneley Colliery or Towneley Desmesne, coal mine in Lancashire
- Towneley High School founded 1941 in Lancashire
- Towneley Park in Lancashire
- Towneley railway station in Lancashire
- Towneley Stadium, a former racing stadium in Lancashire

== Arts ==
- Towneley Mystery Plays
