= List of The Evergreen State College people =

This is a list of notable students and staff of The Evergreen State College (Evergreen), an accredited public liberal arts college and a member of the Council of Public Liberal Arts Colleges. Evergreen is located in Olympia, Washington, United States.

== Notable alumni ==
=== Academia ===
- Wayne Au, educational researcher
- Thomas Herndon, economist
- Matthew Frye Jacobson, historian, professor
- Robert W. McChesney, university professor in communications and media studies
- David Price, anthropologist
- Douglas Robinson, professor of English, dean, best known as a translation scholar
- Roger Stritmatter, professor of humanities; a leading modern-day advocate of the Oxfordian theory of Shakespeare authorship
- Philip S. Thurtle, historian, biologist and academic

=== Activists ===
- Rachel Corrie, International Solidarity Movement political activist, killed in Gaza by Israel Defense Forces
- Saab Lofton, author, activist

=== Business ===
- Bruce Pavitt, founder of Sub Pop Records
- Bre Pettis, entrepreneur; co-founder of MakerBot Industries, NYC Resistor

=== Criminals ===
- Scott Scurlock (1955–1996), robbed 17 banks in the Northwest
- Justin Solondz, convicted felon, convicted in the University of Washington firebombing incident
- Briana Waters, convicted felon, convicted in the University of Washington firebombing incident

=== Entertainment, visual arts and media ===
- Katie Baldwin, artist
- Lynda Barry, cartoonist and author
- Josh Blue, stand-up comedian, winner of Last Comic Standing, member of US Men's Paralympic Soccer Team
- Miz Cracker, drag queen
- Steve De Jarnatt, director of cult films Miracle Mile and Cherry 2000
- Matt Groening, cartoonist, creator of Life in Hell, The Simpsons, and Futurama
- Byron Howard, director and story artist at Walt Disney Feature Animation; lead character animator on Lilo & Stitch and Brother Bear; director of Bolt and Tangled
- Megan Kelso, cartoonist
- Michael Leavitt, fine art sculptor and toy maker
- Audrey Marrs, Academy Award-winning film producer and Sundance Film Festival award winner
- Nikki McClure, illustrator of New York Times best-selling children's book All in a Day
- Sam Miller, comedian
- Jared Pappas-Kelley, artist
- Michael Richards, actor, played Cosmo Kramer on the TV show Seinfeld
- Liz Sales, artist
- Dana Simpson, cartoonist, creator of Phoebe and her Unicorn, and Ozy and Millie
- Margaret Stratton, photographer and video artist
- Steve Thomas, host of the PBS show This Old House
- Cappy Thompson, artist
- Tay Zonday, internet personality, musician, voice actor
- Molly Zuckerman-Hartung, artist

=== Government ===
- Jessica Bateman, member of the Washington House of Representatives
- Maia Bellon, former Washington secretary of Ecology
- Elizabeth Furse, former United States congresswoman
- Yuh-Line Niou, 2002–present; New York State Assembly member whose district includes Chinatown
- Sharon Tomiko Santos, Washington state representative, 37th district

=== Literature ===
- Maile Chapman, author
- Thorn Kief Hillsbery, author
- Benjamin Hoff, writer, The Tao of Pooh
- Steve House, Piolet d’Or Award recipient
- Tom Maddox, science fiction writer
- Robert W. McChesney, co-editor, Monthly Review
- Ken Silverstein, investigative journalist

=== Music ===
- Carrie Brownstein, musician in band Sleater-Kinney and co-star in the television series Portlandia
- Martin Courtney, musician in the band Real Estate
- Phil Elverum, musician
- Ely Guerra, singer-songwriter
- Kathleen Hanna, musician in Bikini Kill, Le Tigre, and The Julie Ruin
- Calvin Johnson, composer, musician, audio producer and founder of K Records
- Conrad Keely, vocalist/guitarist of indie rock band …And You Will Know Us by the Trail of Dead
- Heather Lewis, musician in band Beat Happening
- Sara Lund, musician in band Unwound
- Macklemore, born Ben Haggerty, rapper
- Lois Maffeo, musician
- Myra Melford, jazz pianist and composer
- Mirah, born Mirah Zeitlyn, recording artist
- Katherine K. Preston, musicologist
- Jeff Sherman, musician in band Glass
- Justin Trosper, musician in band Unwound
- Corin Tucker, musician in band Sleater-Kinney
- Tobi Vail, musician in band Bikini Kill
- Kathi Wilcox, musician in band Bikini Kill
- Allison Wolfe, singer, songwriter, writer, and podcaster; member of band Bratmobile

=== Science ===
- Holly Hagen, professor, College of Global Public Health, New York University, and director of the Center for Drug Use and HIV/HCV Research
- Paul Stamets, mycologist

== Faculty and staff ==
- Stephanie Coontz, historian
- Daniel J. Evans, former governor of Washington
- Elizabeth Kutter, biologist
- Miranda Mellis, author
- Bill Ransom, science fiction author
- Gail Tremblay, poet and artist
- Willi Unsoeld, mountaineer (deceased)
