= O'Hagan =

O'Hagan is an Irish surname originally from the pre 10th century Old Gaelic Ó hAodhagáin, meaning perhaps "Little Fire from the Sun", being derived from Aodh the pagan sun god and Og meaning young, they are the "male descendant of Aodh" the pagan sun god, a personal name meaning "fire". Aodh was a pagan god worshipped by the early natives. The first recorded O'Hagan was a district justice of the peace

== Family history ==
Until the destruction of Gaelic order in the 17th century the O'Hagans were the chief Brehons to the Cinel Eoghain, and holding the title Lord of Tulach Óg in County Tyrone, Northern Ireland. The chief exercised the hereditary right of inaugurating O'Neill as king or overlord of Ulster. In medieval times, members of the sept were territorial magnates in Counties Monaghan and Armagh, and two places called Ballyagan, (from "baile", a settlement), one in County Londonderry and the other in County Antrim, further locate the O'Hagans.

Chiefs of the Clan Feargusa, they descended from Fergus Cerrbél mac Conaill Cremthainne (Fergus Crooked Mouth) grandson of Niall of the Nine Hostages said to be High King of Ireland from 370 to 406 who in turn descends from Conn of the Hundred Battles the Milesian Gaelic King of Tara / Ireland in the 2nd century. For over six hundred years the O'Hagans were hereditary brehons and inaugurators of O'Neill (surname) who were descended from the Uí Néill.

Before the 13th century branches of the sept were established in County Monaghan and County Armagh and soon spread into the neighbouring counties of Antrim, Londonderry and Down. Two places called Ballyagan, one in County Londonderry and the other in County Antrim attest to the O'Hagans' predominance in the region.

== The high chair at Tullyhogue ==
According to tradition, O'Hagan inaugurated O'Neill by putting on his slipper hence the shoe always appears in the coat of arms. O'Hagan Gaelic meaning on coat of arms. "Vincere aut mori" meaning Victory or death. Quoted from family coat of arms crest/shield. The inauguration took place at the coronation chair on the O'Hagan lands at Tullyhogue Fort. In the 16th century the 'Leac na Rí', or Stone of the Kings, inauguration stone, which is said to be blessed by Saint Patrick, was embedded in the coronation chair. The chair was destroyed around 1602 at the orders of Lord Mountjoy before the surrender of Hugh O'Neill to Mountjoy. O'Hagans are one of the oldest families in Omeath Co.Louth, arrived when O'Neill attacked Mountjoy at narrowwater on his journey to Carlingford.

== Flight of the Earls ==
During the 17th century O'Hagans staunchly opposed English aggression and a number were at the Battle of Kinsale in 1603, suffering great losses with the dispossessions that followed. Some were hanged at Carrickfergus County Antrim.

There were several O'Hagans among the 98 who fled the north of Ireland in 1607 with Hugh O'Neill, 2nd Earl of Tyrone and Rory O'Donnell, 1st Earl of Tyrconnell in an event commonly referred to as the Flight of the Earls which marked the end of the Gaelic order in Ireland.

== Premodern O'Hagans ==
- Turlough O'Hagan Chief of the Name who journeyed to Wicklow in 1590 to escort Hugh O'Donnell and two children of Shane O'Neill to Ulster following the latter's dramatic escape from imprisonment in Dublin Castle. Turlough is also the fictional narrator in the Hibernian Nights stories published by the Dublin College Press from 1863 to 1865
- Ivor O'Hagan tutor of St Malachy, first recorded spelling of family name which was dated circa 1100, Medieval Records of County Armagh, during the reign of High Kings of Ireland, "with opposition", 1022 - 1166.

== Notable people named O'Hagan ==
- Andrew O'Hagan (b.1968), Scottish author
- Bill O'Hagan (1944–2013), journalist and butcher
- Charles O'Hagan (1881–1931), Irish football player and manager
- Damien O'Hagan, football player
- Dan O'Hagan, football commentator and TV presenter
- Dara O'Hagan (b.1964), nationalist politician in Northern Ireland
- Des O'Hagan (1934–2015), member of the Workers' Party of Ireland
- Hal O'Hagan (1869–1913), US baseball player
- Jack O'Hagan (1898–1987), Australian musician
- Joseph O'Hagan (1900–1978), British trade union leader
- Joe B. O'Hagan (1922–2001), Provisional IRA member
- Joseph B. O'Hagan (1826–1878), Irish-American Jesuit
- John O'Hagan (judge) (1822–1890) patriot poet and judge
- John T. O'Hagan (1925–1991), Fire Commissioner of the City of New York
- Martin O'Hagan (1950–2001), Irish investigative journalist, assassinated
- Maurice Towneley-O'Hagan, 3rd Baron O'Hagan (1882–1961), British politician
- Patrick O'Hagan (1924–1993), Irish-Australian tenor singer father of singer Johnny Logan
- Peter O'Hagan (d.2009), Northern Irish politician
- Sean O'Hagan, Irish musician who has been a member of Microdisney, the High Llamas and Stereolab
- Sean O'Hagan (journalist), Northern Irish journalist, particularly about music and photography
- Sheila O'Hagan, Irish poet
- Thomas O'Hagan, 1st Baron O'Hagan (1812–1885) first Catholic Lord Chancellor of Ireland since James II with peerage title of Baron O'Hagan
- Thomas O'Hagan (Australian judge) (d.1958), Australian judge
- Thomas Towneley O'Hagan, 2nd Baron O'Hagan (1878–1900), landowner
- Timothy O'Hagan (born 1945), British philosopher
- Úna O'Hagan (b.1962), Irish journalist and newsreader
- Colo Tavernier O'Hagan 1942–2020), British-French screenwriter
