= Towneley family =

English family

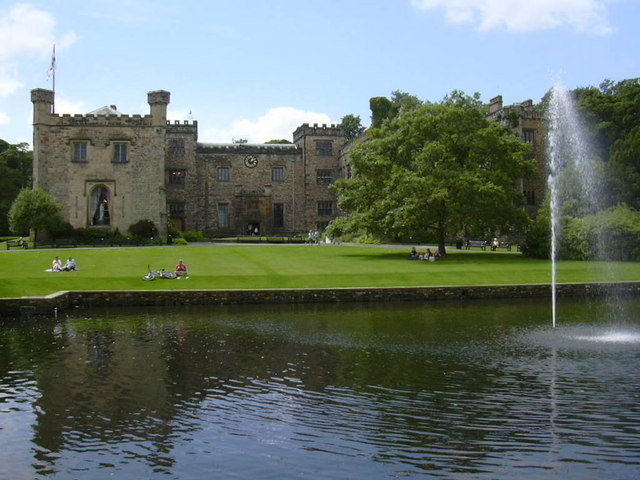
Towneley Hall in Towneley Park, Burnley

The Towneley family, also spelt Townley, is an English landed family whose history is closely associated with Burnley and the surrounding districts of Lancashire. Its principal seat was Towneley Hall, an estate which developed from medieval landholdings and remained associated with the family for several centuries. In 1901, the hall and part of its parkland were sold to Burnley Corporation. The hall is now a Grade I listed building housing a museum and art gallery within Towneley Park.

Across its different branches, the family included soldiers, members of Parliament, magistrates, high sheriffs of Lancashire, antiquarians and collectors. The Towneley Hall branch largely retained the Catholic faith after the Reformation. Some members were fined or imprisoned for recusancy, while restrictions on Catholics affected their participation in public life until the Roman Catholic Relief Act 1829. Notable members included the natural philosopher Richard Towneley, the antiquarian Christopher Towneley and the collector Charles Townley.

The family was not confined to Towneley Hall. Branches became established at Hurstwood, Royle near Burnley, Dutton near Ribchester, Barnside near Colne, and Carr Hall and Stone Edge near Barrowford. The Royle branch also developed a connection with Littleton, historically in Middlesex and now in Surrey. Marriages and the inheritance of property brought members of these branches into contact with other Lancashire landed families, including the Parkers of Cuerden Hall and the Brookes of Astley Hall. The Townley Parker family emerged from these connections.

== Towneley Hall branch ==
=== Medieval origins and consolidation of the estate ===
The earliest recorded history of the family is closely connected with the ownership of land at Towneley and the neighbouring estates of Hapton and Birtwistle. The surviving accounts describe a gradual consolidation of these holdings through grants, purchases, inheritance and marriage.

Between 1195 and 1211, Roger de Lacy made a grant of lands at 'Tunleia', 'Coldcotes' and 'Snodesworth' (Snodworth is south of Langho) to Geoffrey, son of Robert the Dean of Whalley. By 1295 Nicholas de Towneley, thought to be a descendant of Geoffrey, had died and Towneley was shared between his three sisters Agnes, Cecily and Isabel. Cecily was married to John de la Legh, the son of Gilbert, the manager of the local de Lacy cattle farms. The de la Legh family were the largest tenants in Cliviger at the time that it was a possession of Kirkstall Abbey, renting about 40% of the township. Gilbert had attempted to purchase the manor of Hapton in 1303–04, but the acquisition was blocked by Henry de Lacy, and was not completed until 1328. The same year he also purchased Isabel's third of Towneley from her family, the Claytons. John and Cecily had two sons, Gilbert and Richard. Gilbert took control of Hapton and purchased the neighbouring manor of Birtwistle in 1356, whilst Richard acquired Towneley.

==== Richard de Towneley (died 1381) ====
Richard de Towneley was also known as Richard de la Legh. By 1345 he had married Ellen. In 1351, in the aftermath of the Black Death, Richard rented the manor of St Saviour (Stydd) near Ribchester, probably living there for the rest of his life. The same year, along with his brother Gilbert, the Abbot of Whalley and John de Altham, he held the franchise for providing a bailiff for Blackburnshire. In 1353 he was one of two receivers for Lancashire appointed by the 1st Duke of Lancaster, also attending the Parliaments of 1361 and 1371 as a knight of Lancashire. He was Escheator of the County in 1371 and served as the High Sheriff of Lancashire in the 1370s. He died on 16 April 1381, survived by three sons, John, Robert and Henry.

==== John Towneley (1350–1399) ====
John Towneley married Isabella de Rixton, probably in 1382. Following the death of his uncle Gilbert without children, he inherited Hapton and Birtwistle as well as two-thirds of Towneley and land in Cliviger, Worsthorne and Briercliffe. By 1388, he had also acquired the remaining third of Towneley from the descendants of Agnes.

==== Richard Towneley (1387–1455) ====
Richard Towneley married Alice and served as a man-at-arms at the Battle of Agincourt.

==== John Towneley (1415–c. 1473) ====
John Towneley married three times. His children were born to his second wife, Isabel Sherburne.

==== Sir Richard Towneley (1445–1482) ====
Sir Richard Towneley was the son of John and Isabel. He married Joanna Southworth in 1472 and was knighted at Hutton Field in 1482, during Richard, Duke of Gloucester's (later King Richard III) Scottish campaign that captured Berwick-upon-Tweed. He died in 1482 from wounds suffered during the capture of Berwick Castle.

=== Late medieval and Tudor succession ===
Through the fifteenth and early sixteenth centuries, the Towneley line continued through marriages with other landholding families and service in military and county affairs.

==== Sir John Towneley (1473–1540) ====
Sir John Towneley was the son of Sir Richard and Joanna. His marriage to Isabel Pilkington was arranged in 1480. After his father died when John was nine, he grew up under the guardianship of Isabel's father, Sir Charles Pilkington. His wife Isabel inherited Gateford in Nottinghamshire in 1485. He was knighted on 30 September 1497 by the Earl of Surrey, probably at Ayton when the peace treaty was signed with Scotland after the Perkin Warbeck skirmishes. He established Hapton Park in 1514 and enlarged it to cover 1,100 Lancashire acres (equivalent to 2,000 acres (810 ha)), which amounted to about half of Hapton township, making it the second largest in Lancashire after Knowsley. He served as High Sheriff of Lancashire in 1532.

==== Richard Towneley (born 1499) ====
Richard Towneley, the son of Sir John and Isabel, was contracted in 1511 to marry Grace Foljambe, also called Elizabeth. Their son, also named Richard, married Frances Wimbishe in the 1530s. Frances inherited the Nocton estate in Lincolnshire following the death of her brother, Thomas Wymbishe, in 1553. The younger Richard was knighted in 1547, possibly at the Battle of Pinkie Cleugh, and died before his father in 1554. His only surviving child was his daughter Mary.

=== Reformation and recusancy ===
The sixteenth and seventeenth centuries brought major religious and political changes. In the Towneley Hall line, Catholic allegiance became an important feature of the family’s history, and the estate passed between related branches of the family through marriage and inheritance.

==== John Towneley (c. 1528–1607) ====
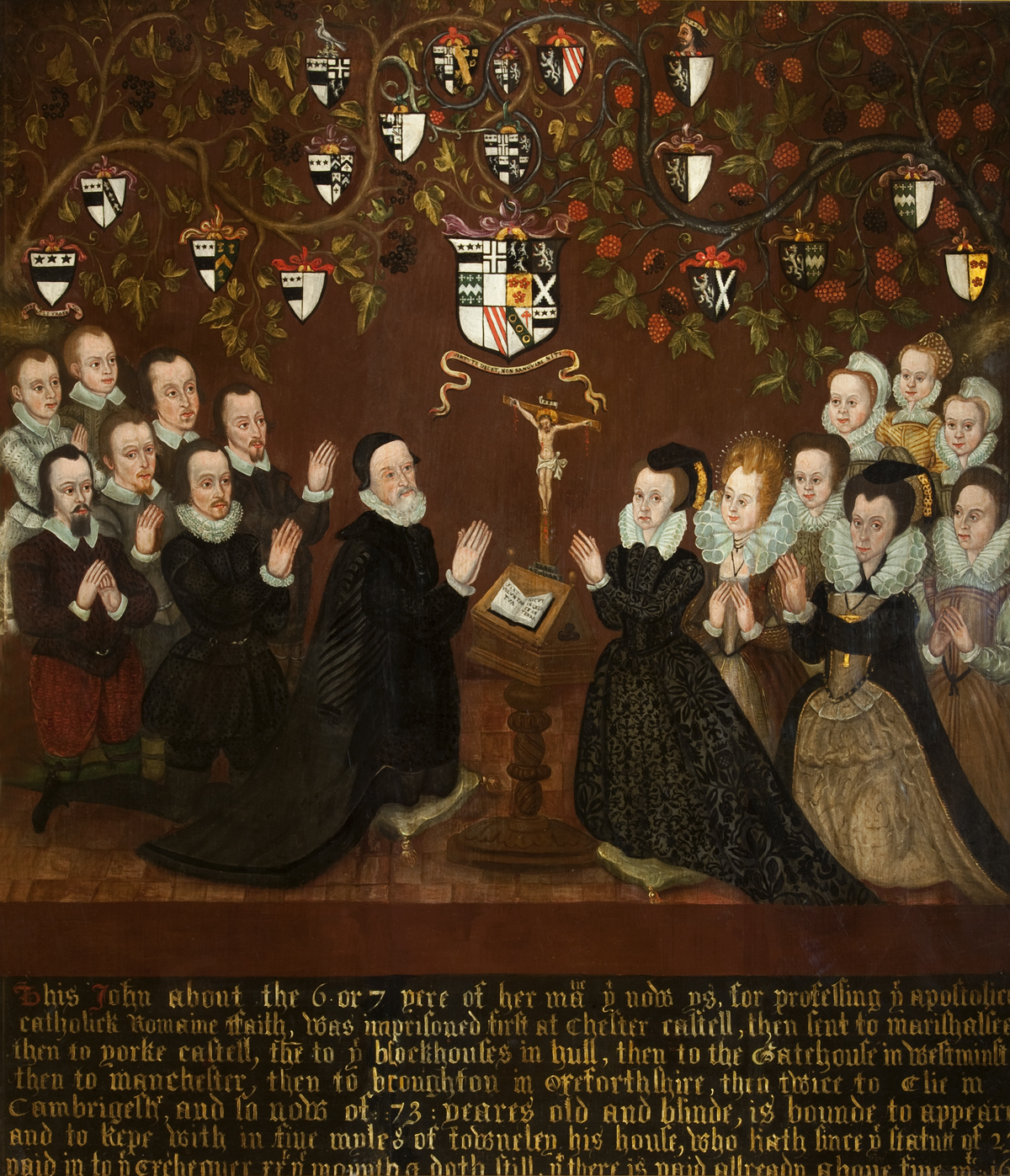
Unknown artist: John and Mary Towneley and family, Towneley Hall Art Gallery & Museum

John Towneley was the son of Charles, Sir John's second son, and Elizabeth Kaye. Through his mother, he was a half-brother of Alexander Nowell and Lawrence Nowell. A lawyer, he was often known as John Towneley of Gray's Inn. In 1557, he married Mary Towneley, then aged about 16, through whom he acquired the estate. They were first cousins once removed: John was a grandson of Sir John, whilst Mary was his great-granddaughter. John was fined and imprisoned several times between 1573 and 1594 for recusancy and giving shelter to Catholic priests during the reign of Elizabeth I.

==== Richard Towneley (1566–1628) ====
Richard Towneley was born at Towneley Hall, Burnley, the son of John and Mary. He married Jane Ashton in 1594 and built a substantial extension on the north side of the hall, completed around 1626.

==== Richard Towneley (1598–1635) ====
Richard Towneley, the son of Richard and Jane, died unmarried.

==== Charles Towneley (1600–1644) ====
Charles Towneley was born at Towneley Hall, the son of Richard and Jane. A Catholic, he attended St. Omer's College and Louvain in Belgium and the English College in Rome between 1614 and 1624. He married Mary Trappes in 1628 and inherited the estate in 1635 upon the death of his brother Richard. He was killed whilst leading a small infantry regiment for the Royalists at the Battle of Marston Moor during the English Civil War.

===== Christopher Towneley (1603 or 1604–1674) =====
Christopher Towneley was born at Towneley Hall, a younger son of Richard and Jane. He became an antiquarian, and a portrait of him was kept at the hall.

=== Civil War aftermath, science and Jacobitism ===
In the generations following the English Civil War, members of the Towneley Hall family faced the consequences of their Royalist and Catholic associations. Alongside these political difficulties, the family also produced scholars and figures involved in scientific work.

==== Richard Towneley (1629–1707) ====
Richard Towneley recovered the family's Lancashire estates from the Parliamentary Sequestration Committee. He was an early exponent of systematic rainfall measurement in England and contributed to the development of the deadbeat escapement.

==== Charles Towneley (1658–1712) ====
Charles Towneley was the son of Richard and Margaret Paston. He married Ursula Fermor in 1685. He and his father were implicated in Jacobite activity supporting the restoration of James II, whose attempt to regain his kingdoms included the campaign that culminated in the Battle of the Boyne in 1690.

==== Richard Towneley (1689–1735) ====
Richard Towneley was the son of Charles and Ursula. In 1713, he married Mary Widdrington, sister of William Widdrington, 4th Baron Widdrington. He was arrested for treason following the Battle of Preston in 1715 but was acquitted after an expensive trial. He died on 18 August 1735. His brothers John and Francis served in the French army and supported the Jacobite rising of 1745. John returned to France before the Battle of Culloden and became a chevalier of the Order of Saint Louis. Another brother, George, married Mary Hodgson, heiress of Leighton Hall near Carnforth.

===== Francis Towneley (died 1746) =====
The youngest son of Charles and Ursula, Francis was born at Towneley and educated in France. In 1728 he enlisted in the French Army and fought at Phillipsburg in 1734. In 1745 he was appointed colonel of the Manchester Regiment. He was captured following the surrender of Carlisle and executed on Kennington Common, London in July 1746. The children's book How The Hangman Lost His Heart, although a work of fiction, is inspired by his story.

=== Eighteenth-century collecting and inheritance ===
During the eighteenth century, the succession to the Towneley estate was shaped by early deaths, inheritance between relatives and the accumulation of collections and other estates.

==== William Towneley (1714–1742) ====
William Towneley, the son of Richard and Mary, was born at Towneley on 30 May 1714. In 1736, he married Cecilia Standish, a granddaughter of the 6th Duke of Norfolk. William died at Bath, Somerset, on 2 February 1742, aged 27. His widow left Towneley Hall during the Jacobite rising and did not return.

==== Charles Townley (1737–1805) ====
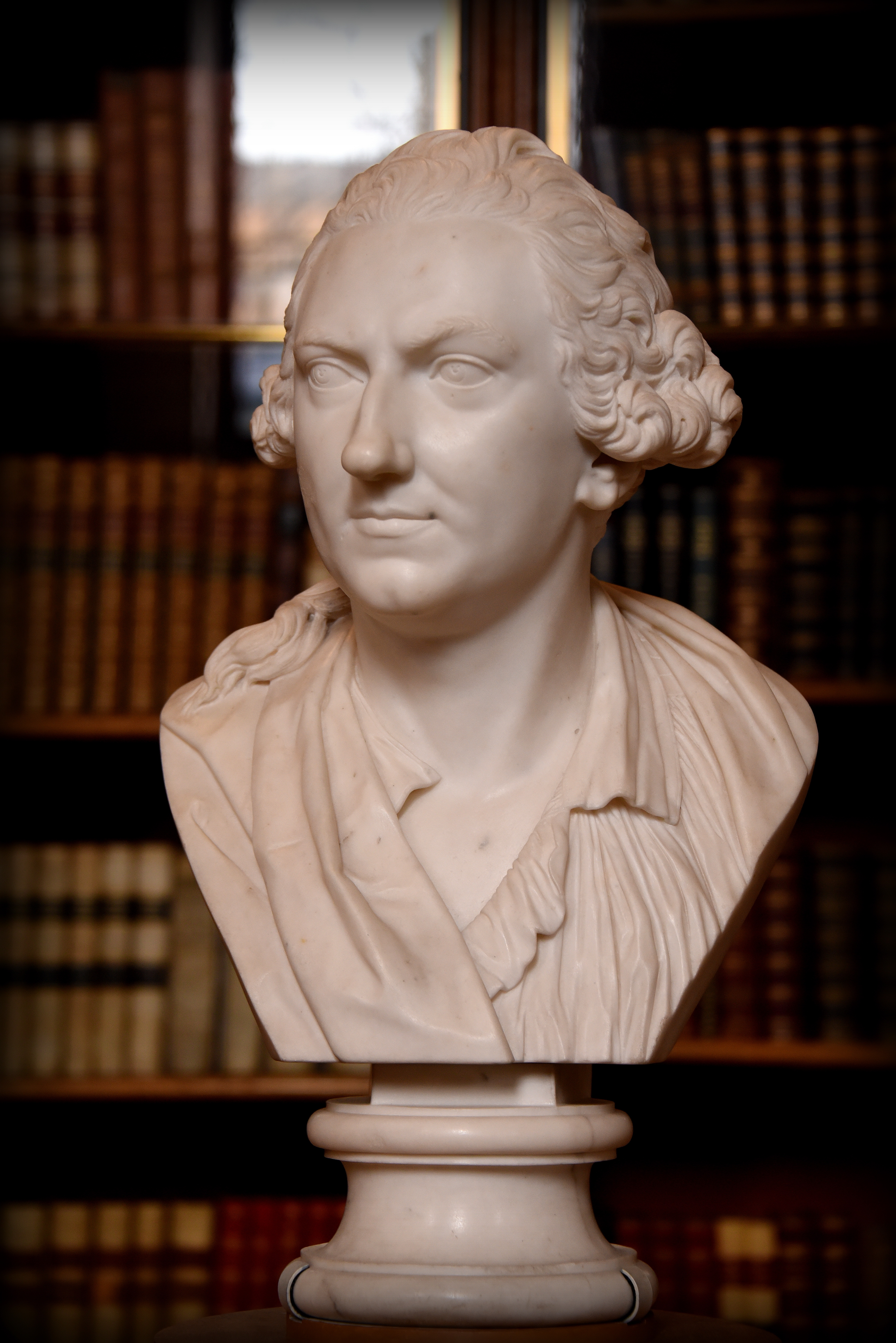
Bust of Charles Townley (1737–1805 CE), by Christopher Hewetson, Rome, 1769 CE. Collector and Trustee of the British Museum. It is housed in the British Museum, London.

Charles Townley was the son of William and Cecilia and the collector of the Townley Marbles (including the Townley Venus, Townley Vase and Townley Discobolus). After his death, Towneley passed to his brother Edward Standish. On Edward's death in 1807, the estate passed to their uncle John.

==== John Towneley (1731–1813) ====
John Towneley, the son of Richard and Mary, was a book collector. He married Barbara Dicconson in 1756. His collection included the Towneley Cycle. In 1786, his uncle George left him the Leighton estate, which he had greatly improved. In 1792 he inherited the Widdrington family's Stella estates through his mother. He was a trustee of the British Museum and was elected a fellow of the Royal Society of London in 1797. He sold the Leighton estate in 1805.

==== Peregrine Edward Towneley (1762–1846) ====
Peregrine Edward Towneley was born on 10 October 1762 at Corney House, Chiswick, the son of John and Barbara. He married Charlotte Drummond in 1794 and was elected a fellow of the Royal Society of London in 1812. In 1814 he sold his father's book collection to fund improvements to the Hall, for which he employed the services of the architect Jeffry Wyattville. Around 1817, he donated land and £1,000 towards a Catholic chapel for the town. The site was on the Todmorden Road in the Burnley Wood area of Habergham Eaves which was later incorporated into the township of Burnley close to the present-day St. Mary's Church. Following the Roman Catholic Relief Act 1829, he became High Sheriff of Lancashire in 1831. He purchased the Lordship of Bowland in 1835. His daughter Frances married Thomas Stonor, later the 3rd Baron Camoys. Their children included the Catholic archbishop Edmund Stonor.

=== Nineteenth-century public life and the division of the estate ===
Following Catholic emancipation, members of the family held public offices and took part in parliamentary, military and county affairs. The nineteenth century also saw the division of the family’s landed property among heirs, eventually separating Towneley Hall from other parts of the wider estate.

==== Colonel Charles Towneley (1803–1876) ====
Charles Towneley was the son of Peregrine and Charlotte. He married Lady Caroline Molyneux, the daughter of William Molyneux, 2nd Earl of Sefton in 1836 and had three daughters: Alice, the second wife of Thomas O'Hagan, 1st Baron O'Hagan, Emily, who married Lord Alexander Gordon-Lennox, and Caroline, who married Montagu Bertie, 7th Earl of Abingdon. He was elected a fellow of the Royal Society of London in 1842. He held the Lordship of Bowland from 1846 to 1876. He was elected MP for Sligo (now in the Republic of Ireland) in 1848 and 1852, but was unseated on petition on both occasions. He served as High Sheriff of Lancashire in 1857. His horse Kettledrum won the 1861 Epsom Derby. Winnings from the race contributed to the construction of St Hubert's Catholic church in Dunsop Bridge. Towneley was commissioned on 16 March 1853 to raise the 5th Royal Lancashire Militia with the rank of Lieutenant-Colonel Commandant, with his brother John as one of the majors. He retired from the command on 23 March 1863 (when his brother was promoted to succeed him) and was appointed Honorary Colonel of the regiment. He was also a justice of the peace, a deputy lieutenant and a fellow of the Society of Antiquaries of London.

==== John Towneley (1806–1878) ====
John Towneley was the son of Peregrine and Charlotte and the brother of Charles. In 1840, he married Lucy Tichborne, daughter of Henry Joseph Tichborne, the 8th Baronet, and his wife Anne, daughter of Sir Thomas Burke of Marble Hill, County Galway, Ireland. John was MP for Beverley from 1841 to 1852. He followed his brother as lieutenant-colonel in 1863 and honorary colonel in 1876 of the 5th Royal Lancashire Militia. He held the Lordship of Bowland from 1876 to 1878. He inherited the estate two years before his death. His only son, Richard, predeceased him in 1877. John had four daughters, Therese, who married John Delacour, Evelyn, Mary and Mabel. The estate was divided between Charles's and John's daughters. Charles's eldest daughter Caroline was already dead and her share went to her husband Montagu Bertie, 7th Earl of Abingdon. His middle daughter Emily, the wife of Lord Alexander Gordon-Lennox inherited the properties in Worsthorne and Cliviger. The portion that included Towneley Hall and its park went to his youngest daughter, Alice, the wife of Baron O'Hagan.

==== Lady Alice O'Hagan (1846–1921) ====
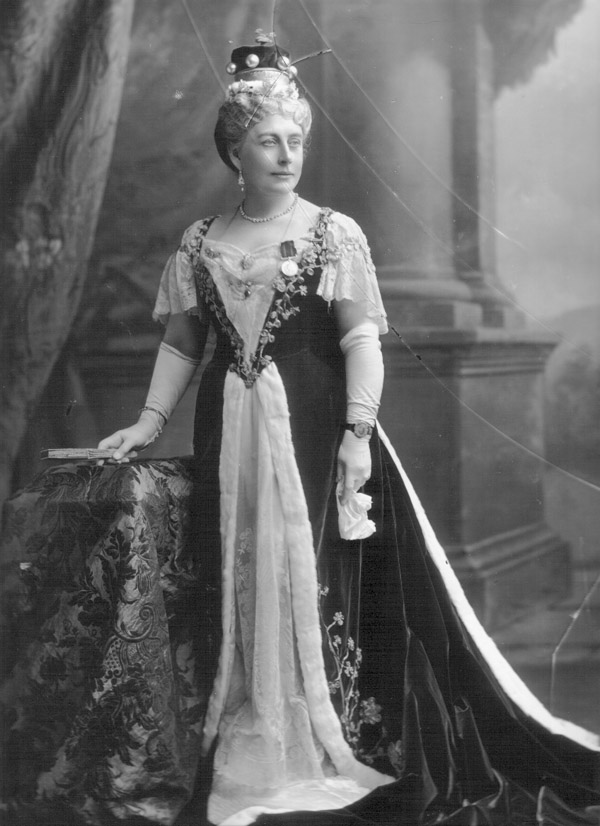
Lady O'Hagan, née Alice Mary Towneley, photographed 11 August 1902.

Alice Mary Towneley, Lady O'Hagan, was the youngest daughter of Colonel Charles Towneley and Lady Caroline Molyneux. She inherited Towneley Hall and its park but found the property difficult to maintain. In 1901, she sold the hall and 62 acres of parkland to the Burnley Corporation.

===== Thomas O'Hagan, 1st Baron O'Hagan =====
Alice married Thomas O'Hagan, 1st Baron O'Hagan (1812–1885), a Knight of St Patrick. Born in Belfast, the son of a trader, he was called to the Irish Bar in 1836. He edited the Newry Examiner from 1838 to 1841, moved to Dublin in 1840 and became an Irish Queen's Counsel in 1849.

His appointments as Solicitor-General for Ireland in 1860 and Attorney-General for Ireland in the following year were followed by his election to Parliament as a Liberal Member of Parliament (MP) for Tralee in 1863. In 1865 he was appointed a judge of common pleas, and in 1868 became Lord Chancellor of Ireland, the first Roman Catholic to hold the chancellorship since the reign of James II.

In 1870 he was created Baron O'Hagan, of Tullahogue in the County of Tyrone, and held office until the resignation of the ministry in 1874. In 1880 he again became Lord Chancellor on Gladstone's return to office, but resigned in 1881, when he became vice-chancellor of the Royal University of Ireland.

===== Thomas Towneley O'Hagan, 2nd Baron O'Hagan =====
Thomas Towneley O'Hagan, 2nd Baron O'Hagan (1878–1900) served in South Africa during the Boer War as a lieutenant in the 3rd Battalion of the Grenadier Guards. He died from illness on 13 December 1900, shortly after his 22nd birthday.

===== Maurice Towneley-O'Hagan, 3rd Baron O'Hagan =====
Maurice Towneley-O'Hagan, 3rd Baron O'Hagan (1882–1961) was the second son of Thomas and Alice O'Hagan. He succeeded his elder brother in the barony in 1900, aged 18.

He served as a government whip in the House of Lords from 1907 to 1910 in the Liberal Government. In 1909, he assumed by Royal licence his maternal grandfather's surname of Towneley in addition to that of O'Hagan.

During the First World War he was a major in the Essex Royal Horse Artillery, for which he raised a regiment in 1914. He was invalided out of the army in 1918.

He switched to supporting the Conservatives in the mid-1920s. Between 1950 and 1961, O'Hagan was a Deputy Speaker and Deputy Chairman of the House of Lords.

Lord O'Hagan married firstly the Hon. Frances Constance Maddalena, daughter of Edward Strachey, 1st Baron Strachie, in 1911. She died in 1931. He married secondly Evelyn Violet, daughter of Harry Thornton Ross, in 1937. O'Hagan died in December 1961. His son, Thomas Anthony Edward Towneley Strachey, had predeceased him in 1955, and the barony passed to his grandson Charles.

===== Charles Towneley Strachey, 4th Baron O'Hagan =====
Charles Towneley Strachey, 4th Baron O'Hagan (1945–2025) served as a page to Elizabeth II from 1957 to 1961. He inherited the family title in 1961 and first took his seat in the House of Lords on 5 December 1967. He was also related to the Strachey baronets.

O'Hagan served as a member of the European Parliament in the European Parliament before the introduction of direct elections. In the 1979 election, he was elected for Devon as a Conservative and remained an MEP until 1994. He also served as a whip and frontbench spokesman in the House of Lords.

In 2008, after years of ill health, he offered to sell some of his subsidiary titles to pay for medical bills.

O'Hagan married Princess Tamara Imeretinsky in 1967, Mary Roose-Francis in 1985 and Elizabeth Smith in 1995. He had two daughters, one from each of his first two marriages. He died on 23 March 2025.

=== Twentieth-century descendants ===
==== Sir Simon Towneley (1921–2022) ====
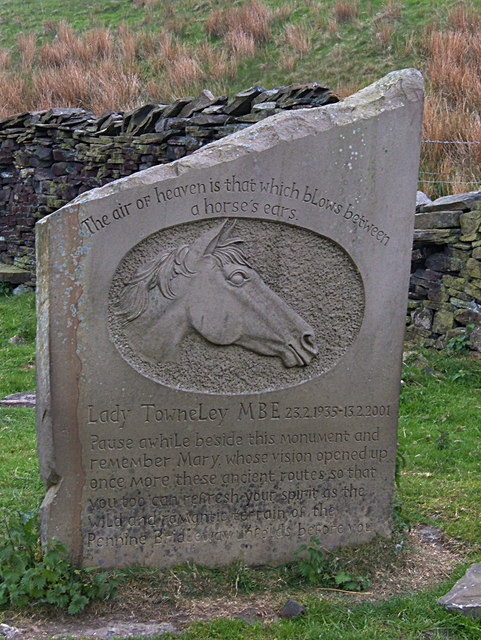
Monument to Lady Mary Towneley on the route of Mary Towneley Loop in Cliviger

Sir Simon Peter Edmund Cosmo William Towneley was a great-grandson of Caroline Towneley through his mother, Priscilla Reyntiens, whose mother was Lady Alice Josephine Bertie. He was the brother of Peregrine Worsthorne and assumed the surname and arms of Towneley by royal licence. He served as High Sheriff of Lancashire in 1971 and Lord Lieutenant of Lancashire from 1976 to 1996, and was appointed KCVO in 1994. His wife Mary was a keen horse rider and instrumental in the development of the Pennine Bridleway. The Mary Towneley Loop, part of the route, is named after her. She was made a MBE in the Queen's Birthday Honours in 2000. One of their daughters is the author K M Grant.

== Other branches of the family ==
In addition to the principal line at Towneley Hall, several branches of the family developed distinct histories and estates. Some remained in east Lancashire, while others acquired land and connections farther afield. Their genealogies are not always equally well documented, and some proposed lines of descent remain uncertain.

=== Townley of Dutton ===
Dutton Hall (53.8263°N 2.5149°W) is close to Ribchester in Lancashire.

The origins of the Dutton branch are uncertain. It has been traced to Robert Towneley, a son of Richard de Towneley and Ellen, but parts of the descent remain unsubstantiated.

Richard Townley (died around 1670) is believed to have built Dutton Hall.

Richard Townley married Jane Greaves. He was steward to Alexander Butterworth of Belfield Hall in Rochdale (formerly in Lancashire now in Greater Manchester). He inherited the Belfield estate in 1728. The family also became associated with Fulbourn in Cambridgeshire and Beaupré Hall in Norfolk. Richard served as High Sheriff of Lancashire in 1751.

Colonel Richard Townley (1726–1801), the eldest son of Richard and Jane, married Anne Western in 1750. He was a patron and friend of the author John Collier, known as Tim Bobbin.

Richard Greaves Townley (1751–1823), the eldest son of Richard and Anne, married Margaret Gale in 1785. His daughter Margaret married Charles Mitford; their son was the politician William Townley Mitford.

Richard Greaves Townley (1786–1855), the eldest son of Richard and Margaret, married Cecil Watson in 1821. He was MP for Cambridgeshire from 1831 to 1841 and from 1847 to 1852. He sold the Belfield Estate in 1851. One of his sons was the jockey and cricketer, Captain Thomas Manners Townley (1825–1895), who came second in the 1860 Grand National.

Charles Watson Townley (1824–1893), the second son of Richard and Cecil, married Georgiana Dalison. He was Lord Lieutenant of Cambridgeshire from 1874 to 1893. One of his sons was Sir Walter Townley (1863–1945) who married Lady Susan Keppel in 1896, the daughter of William Keppel, 7th Earl of Albemarle. He entered a career in the diplomatic service. He held diplomatic appointments to Romania 1911–12, Iran 1912–1916 and the Netherlands 1917–1919. Another son was the agriculturist and politician Max Townley.

The Revd Charles Francis Townley (1856–1930), the eldest son of Charles and Georgiana, married Alice Rosalinde Murray Pratt in 1885.

Charles Evelyn Townley (1887–1983), the eldest son of Charles and Alice, married Marjorie Templer.

Their eldest son was Richard Templer Townley (born 1921).

=== Towneley of Barnside ===
Barnside (53.8701°N 2.1042°W) is east of Colne in Lancashire. This branch of the family also owned Carr Hall (53.8406°N 2.2312°W) (demolished in the 1950s) on the southwestern edge of Barrowford.

The Barnside branch is traced to Lawrence Towneley (1447–1530), the second son of John Towneley and Isabel Sherburne, and brother of Sir Richard Towneley.

Henry Towneley (born c. 1541) married Anne Catterall (born c. 1539), daughter of Thomas Catterall, in 1559. Anne Towneley is a name mentioned in accounts of the Pendle witch trials.

Lawrence Towneley donated a font to the Anglican St Bartholomew's Church in Colne in 1590.

=== Townley of Royle and Littleton ===
Royle (53.8062°N 2.2606°W) is on the northern edge of Burnley on the River Calder, Lancashire.

Littleton refers to Astlam (Astleham) Manor (formerly in Middlesex, today in Surrey), now submerged beneath the Queen Mary Reservoir next to the site of Shepperton Studios.

The Royle branch is traced to Nicholas Towneley, the third son of John Towneley and Isabel Sherburne, and brother of Sir Richard Towneley.

Richard Towneley (1482–1541) married Margaret Clarke.

Nicholas Towneley (1505–1546), the eldest son of Richard and Margaret, entered Gray's Inn in 1522. He married Anne Vaughan.

Edmund Townley (c. 1532–1598), the son of Nicholas, married Katherine Curzon.

Nicholas Towneley (c. 1574–1645), the eldest son of Edmund and Katherine, married Isabell Woodroffe. He served as High Sheriff of Lancashire in 1631.

Francis Townley (c. 1576–1636), the son of Edmund and Katherine, married Catherine Foster. He inherited land in Littleton through his mother around 1600.

Nicholas Townley (1612–1687), the son of Francis and Catherine, married Joanne White. He was known as Nicholas Townley of Littleton. He unsuccessfully attempted to regain the Royle estate in the Court of Chancery in 1646. He sold Astlam around 1660 and moved into London. One of his sons Richard went to America in 1683. He married his second wife, Elizabeth Carteret (née Smith), widow of the first governor of New Jersey Sir Philip Carteret in 1685. Their descendants include Jonathan Townley Crane, Stephen Crane and A. C. Townley.

Nicholas Townley (1642–1685) married Jane Gildredge. He was known as Nicholas Townley of East Bourne.

Charles Townley and James Townley have been identified as the great-grandsons of Nicholas and Joanne, through their father's father (both also called Charles).

Thomas Townley of Royle (1706/7–1772) had an only daughter, Anne, who married Robert Parker of Cuerden Hall in 1756. Thomas's brother Edmund subsequently held Royle and died unmarried in 1796. The estate then passed to Anne's descendants, the Townley Parkers.

=== Townley Parker of Cuerden and Astley ===
The Townley Parker name arose through the connections between the Royle branch of the Townleys and the Parkers of Cuerden. It was further associated with Astley Hall through a subsequent marriage.

The Parker family were a Lancashire landed family associated with Monk Hall and Extwistle Hall in Briercliffe before later establishing their principal seat at Cuerden Hall. The family became connected with two cadet branches of the Towneley family through marriage.

John Parker of Extwistle married Margaret Townley, daughter of Lawrence Townley of Barnside, a marriage recorded in the Lancashire Visitation of 1664–65.

Several generations later, Robert Parker of Cuerden Hall (1727–1779) married Anne Townley, the only daughter and heir of Thomas Townley of Royle. Their sons included Banastre Parker and Thomas Townley Parker. Thomas succeeded to Cuerden after Banastre's death. Royle passed to Anne's descendants following the death of her uncle Edmund Townley in 1796.

Thomas Townley Parker married Susannah Brooke, heiress of Astley Hall. Their son, Robert Townley Parker (1793–1879), inherited Cuerden as an infant. He later served as MP for Preston. He was also High Sheriff of Lancashire, a magistrate and Guild Mayor of Preston.

The Townley Parker family had connections through marriage and inheritance with the Parkers of Extwistle and Cuerden, the Townleys of Barnside and Royle, and the Brookes of Astley.

=== Townley of Hurstwood ===
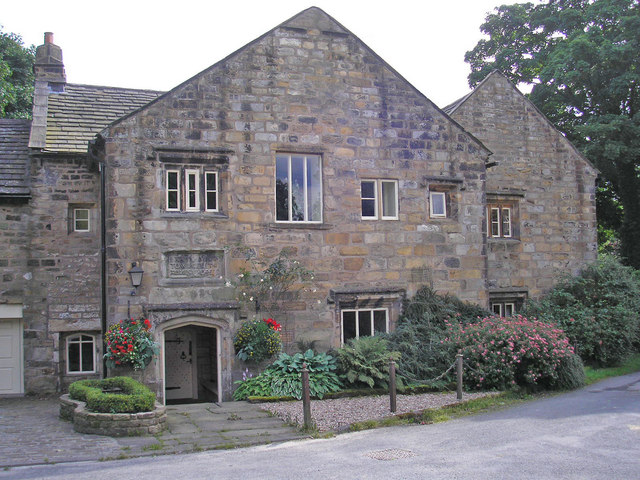
Hurstwood Hall, near Burnley

Hurstwood (53.7782°N 2.1818°W) is 2 miles from Towneley Hall.

The Hurstwood branch was established by Bernard Towneley (died 1603), illegitimate son of John Towneley, the brother of Sir John. He married Agnes Ormeroyd. He built Hurstwood Hall in 1579.

John Towneley (c. 1564–1628), son of Bernard and Agnes, married Eleanor Haydock in 1583/4.

John Townley (baptised 1599, died 1664) married Eleanor Grymshaw.

John Towneley (1631–1664) married Katherine Rishton.

John Towneley (c. 1660–1704) married Helen Brooke in 1681. The Hurstwood property subsequently passed through their daughter Catherine to her husband, Richard Whyte.

=== Towneley of Stone Edge ===
Stone Edge (53.8664°N 2.2100°W) is near Barrowford.

The Stone Edge (or Stonehedge) branch of the family was established by Lawrence Towneley (1543–1598), the great-grandson of the Lawrence Townley (1447–1530) who established the Barnside branch (above).

Published genealogies have traced George Washington and Robert E. Lee to the Stone Edge branch. A genealogical website also gives a connection to Elizabeth II.

== Sources ==
- Pink, William Duncombe; Beaven, Alfred Beaven (1889), The Parliamentary Representation of Lancashire, (County and Borough), 1258–1885, with Biographical and Genealogical Notices of the Members, Etc.
- Whitaker, Thomas Dunham (1876), An history of the original Parish of Whalley, and honor of Clitheroe... 4th ed., vol. 2, George Routledge, pp. 540–8, OCLC 697798990
- Farrer, William; Brownbill, John, eds. (1911), The Victoria History of the County of Lancaster Vol 6, Victoria County History, Constable & Co, OCLC 832215477
- H.G. Hart, The New Annual Army List, and Militia List (various dates from 1840)
- Tracing the Towneleys (PDF), Towneley Hall Society, 2004, archived from the original (PDF) on 4 August 2017
- Hapton Heritage - A Landscape History and Village Survey (PDF), Bluestone Archaeology, 2013
- Gillow, Joseph, ed. (1906), "Catholic Registers of Towneley Hall, Lancashire (baptisms and marriages)", Miscellanea, vol. 2, Catholic Record Society (Great Britain)
- Burke, John (1837). A Genealogical and Heraldic History of the Landed Gentry; Or, Commoners of Great Britain and Ireland Etc. Vol. 2. Henry Colburn. pp. 262–266.
- Tracing the Towneleys 2024 (PDF), Towneley Hall Society, 2024
