= Haggin =

Haggin may refer to:

Surname

- B. H. Haggin (1900–1987), American music critic
- James Ben Ali Haggin (1822–1914), American attorney, rancher, investor, racehorse owner & breeder
- Ben Ali Haggin (1882–1951), American portrait painter and stage designer
- John Haggin (1753–1825), early settler of Kentucky,
- William Haggin Perry (1910–1993), owner and breeder of Thoroughbred racehorses

Other

- Haggin Museum, an art museum and local history museum in Stockton, California
- Haggin Stakes, American Thoroughbred horse race run annually at Hollywood Park Racetrack in Inglewood, California

== See also ==
- Hagin
- Hanggin (disambiguation)
