= John O'Hagan =

John O'Hagan may refer to:

- John O'Hagan (judge)
- John O'Hagan (politician)
- John O'Hagan (priest)
- John T. O'Hagan, fire commissioner of the City of New York

== See also ==
- John Hagan (disambiguation)
