= Hagins =

Hagins is a surname. Notable people with the surname include:

- Emily Hagins (born 1992), American film director
- Isaac Hagins (born 1954), American football player
- Josh Hagins (born 1994), American basketball player
- Montrose Hagins (1924–2012), American actress and schoolteacher

== See also ==
- Hagans, another surname
- Hagin, another surname
