= Teaching the Actuality of Revolution =

2023 book by Derek R. Ford

- Cover
- Author: Derek R. Ford
- Original title: Teaching the Actuality of Revolution: Aesthetics, Unlearning, and the Sensations of Struggle
- Language: English
- Subject: Philosophy, aesthetics, education, communism, critical pedagogy
- Genre: Non-fiction
- Publisher: Iskra Books
- Publication date: 2023
- Publication place: United States
- Pages: 158
- ISBN: 979-8295773143
- Text: Teaching the Actuality of Revolution at Iskra Books

Teaching the Actuality of Revolution: Aesthetics, Unlearning, and the Sensations of Struggle is a 2023 book by American educational theorist, author and academic Derek R. Ford. (Note: Ford serves as the education department chair at the Hampton Institute and holds editorial roles in publications such as Liberation School, Postdigital Science and Education, and the Journal for Critical Education Policy Studies.) (Note: Ford organizes with the ANSWER Coalition, Indianapolis Liberation Center, and International Manifesto group.) The book, which is their eighth monograph, explores the intersection of aesthetics, pedagogy, and the experiential aspects of revolutionary movements. The book draws on diverse Marxist traditions, including those of Paulo Freire, Louis Althusser, Henri Lefebvre, Brian Becker, and Fredric Jameson. Building on the work of Peter McLaren, Ford weaves these diverse Marxist traditions together to explore the revolutionary potentials in education broadly considered. The book has been widely reviewed in a variety of academic journals and is considered by Peter McLaren to be his breakthrough work.

== Summary ==
The book examines the intersection of pedagogy, aesthetics, and Marxist revolution. Ford challenges traditional ideology critique, proposing Marxist pedagogy shift from knowledge acquisition to somatic experiences. Ford argues ideology is not a set of incorrect ideas and instead follows Althusser, Jennifer Ponce de León, and Gabriel Rockhill and argues "our sensuous capacities, their organizations, and the entire sensuous world are historically produced" (p. 5). The aesthetics of class struggle are significant given that capitalism can profit from the endless critiques of it. The first chapter articulates the perceptual ecology of capitalist domination by reading Marx's Capital as an aesthetic and pedagogical text, and the second chapter argues that capitalism reproduces its perceptual ecology by reducing teaching to the pedagogy of learning, which is an endless process where we “endlessly identify, improve, accumulate, and perform our competencies” ( p. 52).

In response, he develops a theory of teaching as provoking unlearning, where the teacher opens and maintains spaces in which we experience “the gaps in the present” that can't be known but only thought (p. 59). The remaining three chapters focus on the materiality of thought, listening for uncertainty, and the pedagogy of arrhythmia. Each of the chapters illustrates examples of how teaching as unlearning does not demonstrate or explain the alternatives present in the world but produces experiences of such alternatives. The book's conclusion introduces "perceptual mapping," a pedagogical model connecting abstract concepts to real projects of building socialism.

== Critical reviews ==
In Rethinking Marxism, Sylvester J. Cruz situates Ford's overall work with Peter McLaren, Wayne Au, Sandy Grande, and others working in Marxist education who all "see education, or 'revolutionary critical pedagogy,' as an activist and community-organizational praxis." Within this literature, Cruz argues that Ford's "particular focus on the intersections of aesthetics, pedagogy, and the political and his identification of the revolutionary counterpolitical with the pedagogical method itself are what make this intervention so unique." Cruz concludes his review by noting the "ambitious and energizing study" would be bolstered by more specific classroom examples.

Simon Boxley praised the book for its focus on pedagogy within Marxist education, emphasizing the material aspects of teaching. He appreciated Ford's exploration of aesthetics, unlearning, and sensations in the struggle against capitalism. Boxley acknowledged Ford's commitment to communism and his innovative and unique Marxist scholarship on pedagogy. He commended Ford's efforts to connect ideology, perception, and practice through pedagogy, highlighting its potential to disrupt and reshape the experiences of the current conjuncture. Boxley wrote:

"This book, like some of Ford’s others has a real significance to all of our practices. In preparing course materials in recent days, I have subjected them to scrutiny, asking myself how and when they might elicit pedagogical interventions towards unlearning and disinterpellation, and when they might close off that possibility. This book does indeed make educators like myself think again about our pedagogy. No doubt. And in doing so I think it genuinely hints at the possible ways in which we might point towards thinking the actuality of revolution."

Boxley's review essay argues there are two gaps in the book. The first is the lack of concrete examples of the more abstract concepts and the second is the question of the teacher. “Unlike some of his other work,” Boxley notes, “the [communist] Party barely figures here as a place of teaching, still less non-Party public fora” (p. 271).

Jesus Jaime-Diaz and Aimée Azul Chávez thought the book challenges activist scholars in academia who perpetuate capitalism. They appreciated the book's focus on disrupting capitalist perceptual ecology through the interplay of perception and sensation, providing a rupture in traditional aesthetics. The reviewers commended Ford's exploration of pedagogy, unlearning, and the struggles against social inequality. They found value in Ford's engagement with various educational theories and theorists, such as Freire, Althusser, and Lefebvre. They recognized the importance of the book for educators, practitioners, and scholars as a guide for questioning societal norms and the education system. However, they suggested clarifying the book's audience and incorporating layman's terms for complex theoretical concepts, while also emphasizing the need for critical reflection on racialized social class and gender oppression in relation to capital's perceptual ecology.

Eli J. Pine judged the book to be a practical exploration of pedagogy, aesthetics, and Marxist methodology. Ford's emphasis on unlearning, the affectual realm of class struggle, and the cultivation of an "educational modality" resonated with Pine, who appreciated the book's ability to guide readers through complex concepts. Pine praised Ford's integration of diverse Marxist traditions and highlighted the book's structure, which included chapters on pedagogy, perceptual ecology, encounters, listening, and the pedagogy of arrhythmia. Unlike Boxley, Pine says the book “a welcome contribution to both theory and practice that may well be read on the picket line, in the university classroom, or by a reading group of comrades” (p. 513).

Peter McLaren, a leading global Marxist educational scholar who served on Ford's PhD committee, appreciated the book emphasizing its importance in steering the next generation of critical scholars. He praised the book for respecting diverse political perspectives and highlighting a commitment to revolutionary struggle as a unifying force. McLaren acknowledged Ford's theoretical adaptability, strategic proficiency, and termed the book's conclusion as "perceptual mapping" – a pedagogical model aligned with Fredric Jameson's cognitive mapping but emphasizing multimodality and the sonic. He stated this was the first book of Ford's with a satisfying conclusion or a “substantive closing.” At the end of his review, McLaren implied Ford's critique of critical intellectuals, particularly the “iconoclastic Henry Giroux,” was too harsh and not comradely enough.

Isabelle Bishop, writing in Studies in Philosophy and Education published by Springer Publishing, believes "Ford’s emphasis of the aesthetics of education is critical for educators concerned about teaching amid the onslaught of proliferating forms of authoritarianism enabled by capitalism." Bishop identifies how Ford "mentions taste twice" but only in "passing comments" (p. 709). Thus, Bishop builds on Ford's work by adding in the politics of school lunches and the sense of taste to the project.
