= Southport College =

Location
- Mornington Road; Southport, Merseyside, PR9 0TT; England; 53.648220°N 2.997740°W

Information
- Type: Further education college
- Motto: Progress to success
- Established: 1935
- Department for Education URN: 130491 Tables
- Ofsted: Reports
- Chair: Ronnie Fell
- Principal: Michelle Keagan
- Gender: Mixed
- Age: 16 to 18
- Website: https://www.southport.ac.uk/

Southport College (previously known as Southport Technical College) is a further education college located in Southport, Merseyside, England. Southport College merged with King George V College in January 2018. The combined colleges maintain their separate identities and offer A-level and Vocational education.

== History ==
Southport Technical College opened in 1935. This institution brought together a number of technical courses which had been offered throughout Southport (then part of Lancashire) since 1887. In 1938 Southport School of Arts and Crafts was founded. The two institutions were amalgamated in 1989 to form Southport College. In January 2018 Southport College merged with King George V College, Southport.

== The college today ==
Southport College offers a range of courses to students from Southport and the surrounding area. These courses include Diplomas, NVQs, BTECs and Access courses. In addition, Southport College offers some higher education courses in conjunction with the University of Central Lancashire and the University of Cumbria.

== Notable alumni ==
- Joseph Hagan
- Marc Almond
- Marcus Wareing
