= Hagin =

Hagin is a surname. Notable people with the surname include:

- Joe Hagin (born 1956), American politician
- Kenneth E. Hagin (1917–2003), American Pentecostal preacher
- Wayne Hagin (born 1956), American sportscaster
- Fanny Hagin Mayer (1899–1990), American folklorist, translator

== See also ==
- Hagins, another surname
- Hagans, another surname
- Hagon, another surname
- Hagen, a city in Germany
