= Charles Strachey, 4th Baron O'Hagan =

British politician (1945–2025)

The Right Honourable The Lord O'Hagan
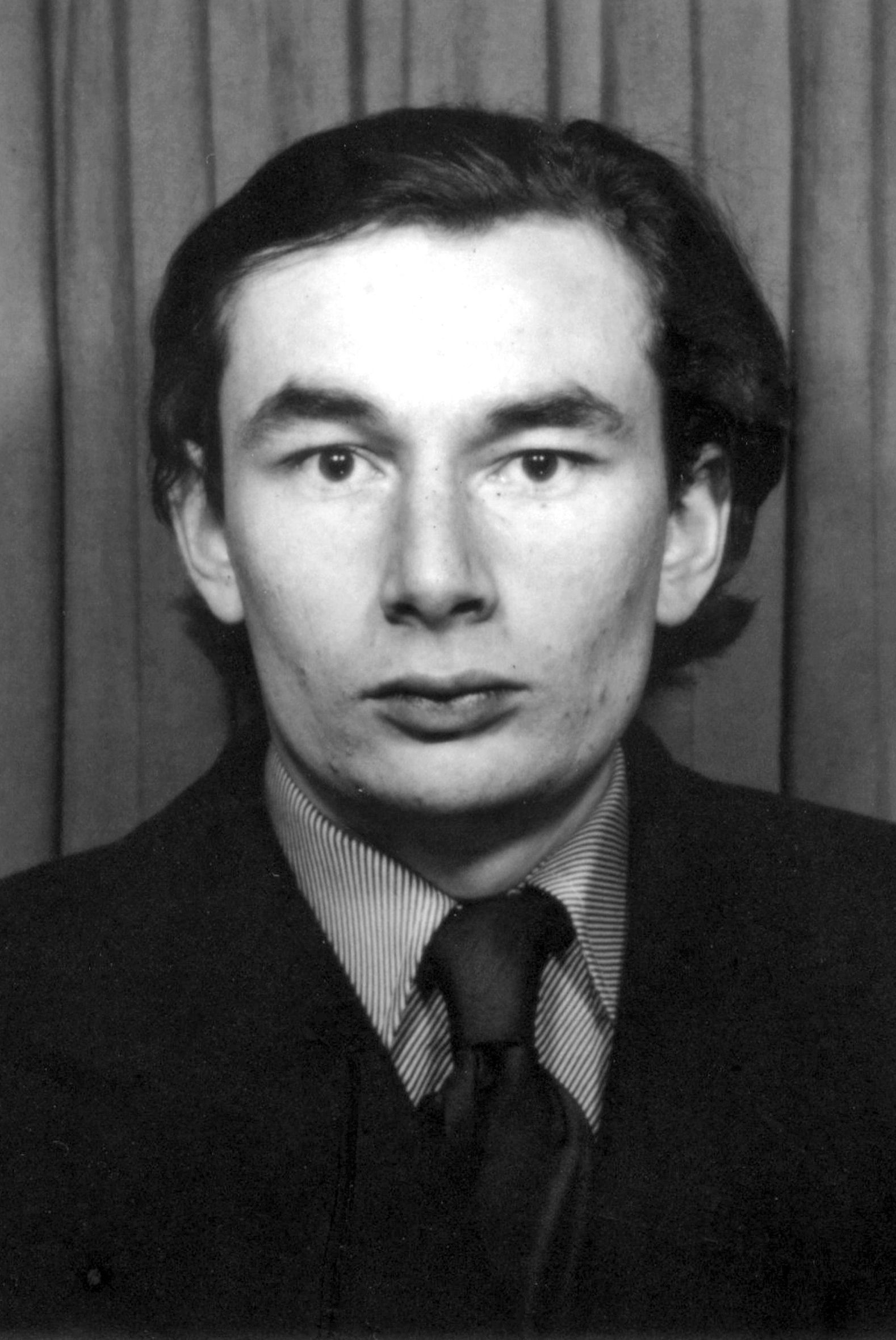
- European Parliament portrait

Member of the European Parliament for Devon
- In office 1973–1975
- Preceded by: he was a delegate
- Succeeded by: he was a delegate
- In office 1979–1994
- Preceded by: Constituencies established
- Succeeded by: Constituency abolished

Personal details
- Born: 6 September 1945
- Died: 23 March 2025 (aged 79) Barnstaple, Devon, England
- Party: Crossbencher (1967–1973); Independent (1973–1975); Conservative (1975–2025)
- Relations: See Strachey

Charles Towneley Strachey, 4th Baron O'Hagan (6 September 1945 – 23 March 2025) was a British Conservative politician.

== Early years and background ==
O'Hagan was born a godson of Princess Elizabeth, later Queen Elizabeth II. The grandson of Maurice Towneley-O'Hagan, 3rd Baron O'Hagan, he inherited the family title at the age of 16 on his grandfather's death in 1961, his father, the Hon. Major Thomas Strachey, having committed suicide in 1955. He was educated at Eton and New College, Oxford, and served as a Page to Queen Elizabeth II between 1959 and 1961. A relative of the Strachey baronets, he was the great-great-grandson of Edward Strachey, 1st Baron Strachie.

== Political career ==
O'Hagan first took his seat in the House of Lords on 5 December 1967, and gave his maiden speech whilst he was still a student.

He was appointed an Independent MEP in December 1972, taking his seat on the day Britain began its EEC membership, 1 January 1973. Between 1973 and 1979, British MEPs were not elected, but were appointed from the House of Commons and the House of Lords. Since the Labour party was deeply divided over EEC membership, it refused to nominate members to the Parliament. Accordingly, O'Hagan was one of a group of Independents and Liberals appointed instead of the Labour nominations.

During this first period as an MEP, O'Hagan tried to introduce the first Bill to allow the European Parliament to be directly elected instead of appointed. On 1 May 1974, he introduced the Bill in the House of Lords, but it was voted down.

The 5 June 1975 referendum on British EEC membership settled the question of Britain's position in Europe, and from that point onwards, the Labour party demanded its share of MEP nominations. O'Hagan thus lost his seat on 3 July 1975 after a joint decision by the Conservative and Labour parties to cease appointing Independents and Liberals to the European Parliament. He then joined the Conservative party and became a whip and a frontbench spokesman for the Conservatives in the House of Lords between 1977 and 1979. He was also involved in the Primrose League before its dissolution, serving as its Chancellor from April 1979 to April 1981.

In the first direct elections to the European Parliament in 1979, he was returned as MEP for Devon as a Conservative, with 61.8% of the vote and a majority of 86,022. He was then re-elected in 1984, when his vote share dropped to 54.7% and his majority fell to 56,620. At the 1989 European Parliament election he was again re-elected, and although his vote share dropped further to 46.4%, a split in the opposition vote meant that his majority actually increased to 57,298. He remained an MEP until his resignation in March 1994. He had been due to contest the 1994 European Parliament election, fighting the newly drawn constituency of Devon and East Plymouth, but he resigned three months before the election, citing the collapse of his second marriage, commenting "You can't fight an election with your mind on other things." In other sections of the press, his resignation was attributed to ill health. Giles Chichester was selected as Conservative candidate in his place, narrowly holding the seat by just 700 votes.

O'Hagan was generally regarded as pro-European, and was described by Jonathan Prynn of The Times as "colourful." Towards the end of his term of office, he suffered from ill health, and his overall attendance record slipped to the second-lowest of any British MEP, behind Ian Paisley.

In 1999, in line with most other hereditary peers, he lost his right to sit in the House of Lords, although he had been on a leave of absence since the previous year, in the wake of declining health. He did not stand for election to become one of the 92 hereditary peers who retained their seats.

== Post-political career ==
O'Hagan made headlines in 2008, offering to sell some of his subsidiary titles to pay for medical bills. In 2009, it was reported that he had stepped forward on behalf of the Towneley family to claim the title of 15th Lord of Bowland. Previously, this ancient Lancastrian lordship had been thought lost or in the possession of the Crown having disappeared from the historical record in late nineteenth century. The Towneleys had owned the Bowland Forest estate from 1835 and it transpired that the title had been retained by an extinct family trust. The title was auctioned and later came into the possession of William Bowland, a Cambridge University don who thereby assumed the title 16th Lord of Bowland.

== Personal life and death ==
O'Hagan was married three times – firstly to the Georgian Princess Tamar Bagration-Imeretinsky (1967–1984), secondly to Mary Roose-Francis (1985–1995), and thirdly to Elizabeth Smith (1995–2025). He had two daughters – one from each of his first two marriages (Nino, b. 1968; and Antonia, b. 1986) – and his heir presumptive was his younger brother, the Hon. Richard Strachey.

In 1975, he sold the papers of several of his Irish ancestors, including those of the 1st Baron O'Hagan, to the Public Record Office of Northern Ireland (PRONI).

In 1973, he inherited the 14th-century Sutton Court in Somerset, ancestral home of the Stracheys since 1858; the house was left to him after the death of Edward Strachey, 2nd Baron Strachie, who had no heir. In 1987 O'Hagan sold it for conversion into flats. Those paintings of Sutton Court which were not sold in 1987 were sold by O'Hagan in 1994 and 2007.

O'Hagan died from a subdural hematoma on 23 March 2025, at the age of 79.

== Arms ==
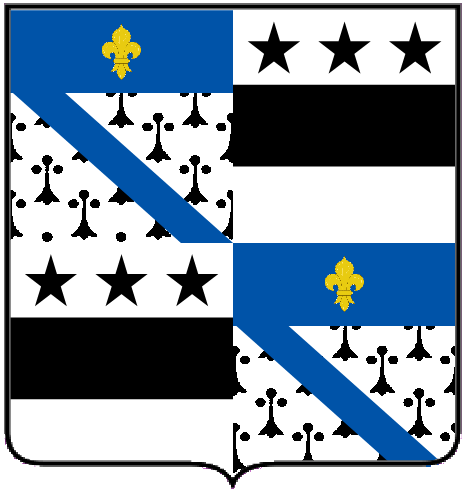
Arms of Lord O'Hagan

The coat of arms of the Lords O'Hagan is blazoned Quarterly 1st & 4th Ermine a bend Azure on a chief of the last a fleur-de-lys Or (for O’Hagan); 2nd & 3rd Argent a fess Sable in chief three mullets of the second (for Towneley). The crest has two figures, first on a Roman fasces lying fesswise proper a cubit arm vested Gules cuffed Ermine the hand holding a dagger erect both proper (for O’Hagan), the second on a perch Or a hawk close Proper beaked and belled Gold jessed Gules (for Towneley). The supporters are Two lions Or collared gemel Sable pendent therefrom an escutcheon Argent charged with a hand couped Gules, and the motto is “Mihi Res Non Me Rebus”, meaning means “I suit life to myself, not myself to life”.

European Parliament
New constituency	Member of the European Parliament for Devon; June 1979 – March 1994	Constituency abolished
Peerage of the United Kingdom
Preceded by Maurice Towneley-O'Hagan	Baron O'Hagan; 1961–2025; Member of the House of Lords (1961–1999)	Succeeded by Richard Towneley Strachey
