= Edward Hagan =

Edward Hagan may refer to:

- Edward James Hagan (1879–1956), Scottish minister and biblical scholar
- Edward P. Hagan (1846–1893), American politician from New York
