= Hagans =

Hagan is a surname. Notable people with the surname include:

- Ashton Hagans (born 1999), American basketball player
- John Hagans (1838–1900), American politician, lawyer, and judge
- Lauren Hagans (born 1986), American long-distance runner
- Marques Hagans (born 1982), American football coach and former player
- Matt Hagans (born 1956), American stock car racing driver

== See also ==
- Hagans Homestead, historic building in West Virginia, U.S.
- Hagan (surname), another surname
- Hagon, another surname
- Hagin, another surname
