= Nino Strachey =

British writer and historian (born 1968)

Nino Natalia O'Hagan Strachey is a British writer and historian, specialising in the works and lives of the Bloomsbury Group.

== Origins and education ==
Strachey was born the daughter of Charles Strachey, 4th Baron O'Hagan and Tamara Imeretinsky, a Georgian princess of the Bagrationi dynasty of Imereti. Lytton Strachey (1880-1932), a central member of the Bloomsbury Group, was her first cousin, several times removed.

She read history as an undergraduate at the Queen’s College, Oxford and later studied at the Courtauld Institute of Art.

== Career and works ==
After graduating from the Courtauld Institute, Strachey worked for the Landmark Trust, English Heritage, and the National Trust, ending her conservation career as the National Trust’s Head of Research and Specialist Advice.

Her published books include:

- Rooms of Their Own: Eddy Sackville-West, Virginia Woolf, Vita Sackville-West (2018, National Trust Books; ISBN 1841657883)
- Young Bloomsbury (2022, London: John Murray; ISBN 9781529306934)

The Times Literary Supplement described Rooms of Their Own as a “beautiful, evocative little book” and said of Young Bloomsbury that, “Nino Strachey’s strength as a biographer is to draw sensitive and non-judgmental portraits of people whose private agonies seemed at odds with their outwardly confident appearance.”

Strachey is a Fellow of the Royal Historical Society.

== Personal life ==
Strachey is married to the film director, Harry Bradbeer. The couple have one child and live in West London.
