= Senator Hagan (disambiguation) =

Kay Hagan (1953–2019) was a U.S. Senator from North Carolina from 2009 to 2015. Senator Hagan may also refer to:

- Bob Hagan (born 1949), Ohio State Senate
- Edward P. Hagan (1848–1893), New York State Senate
- G. Elliott Hagan (1916–1990), Georgia State Senate

== See also ==
- Hagan (surname)
- David Haggan (fl. 2010s–present), Maine State Senate
