= Liz Sales =

American artist and educator

Liz Sales is an American artist and educator. She works primarily in the medium of photography, and her work explores the interplay between lens-based perception and human perception. Her writing has been published in multiple magazines, including International Street Photographer, Triple Canopy, Foam Magazine, and Musée Magazine. She was an editor at Conveyer Magazine. Sales works in New York City.

Her interest in photography began as a teenager, when she began constructing her own cameras from a variety of materials after learning to make a pinhole camera in a class. She continues to build cameras using a variety of media, stating in an interview: "I think I like the idea that cameras are not exclusively commodities; all things possess the potential to become cameras."

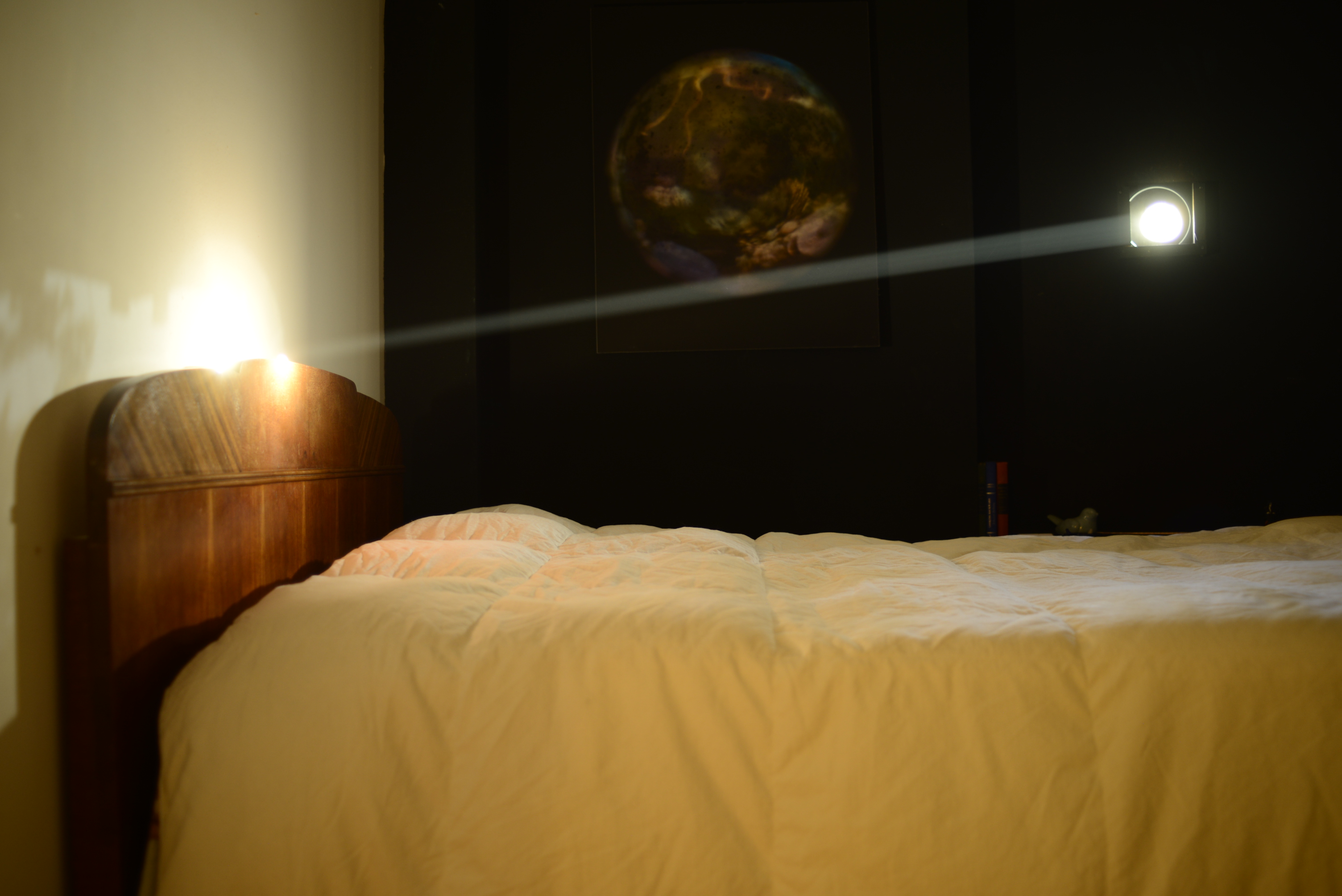
Sales turned her bedroom into a camera obscura, in which a small hole in one side of a darkened room projects an inverted image of the outside world on its surfaces.

Sales holds an MFA from a joint program between Bard College and the International Center of Photography. She also received a BA from Evergreen State College. She teaches classes at the College of Staten Island of the City University of New York, the University of Connecticut, and the International Center of Photography.

== Exhibitions ==
- A build-it-yourself (multi)verse, ICP Studio Gallery, Long Island City, 2010
- Paper Moon, Gallery Aferro, Newark, New Jersey, 2010
- Nature Within, ISE Cultural Foundation @ Front Space, New York, June 3 - July 1, 2011.
- ICP-Bard MFA Thesis Group Exhibition, Rita K. Hillman Gallery, New York, March 30 - May 20, 2012.
- Structure For Reading: Text (Infra)structure & The Reading Body in Contemporary Art, Center for Book and Paper Arts at Columbia College Chicago, February 15 - April 6, 2013.
- The Eye's Mind, New York Public Library, Mid-Manhattan branch, New York, September 4, 2013 - March 17, 2014.

== Publications ==
- I Write Artist Statements. Hillsborough, North Carolina: Daylight Books, July 2018.
- This Folder May Contain Clippings and Other Ephemeral Material. Jersey City, New Jersey: Conveyor Arts, September 2012.
- Music Books. New York : Liz Sales, 2010
