= Susannah Hagan =

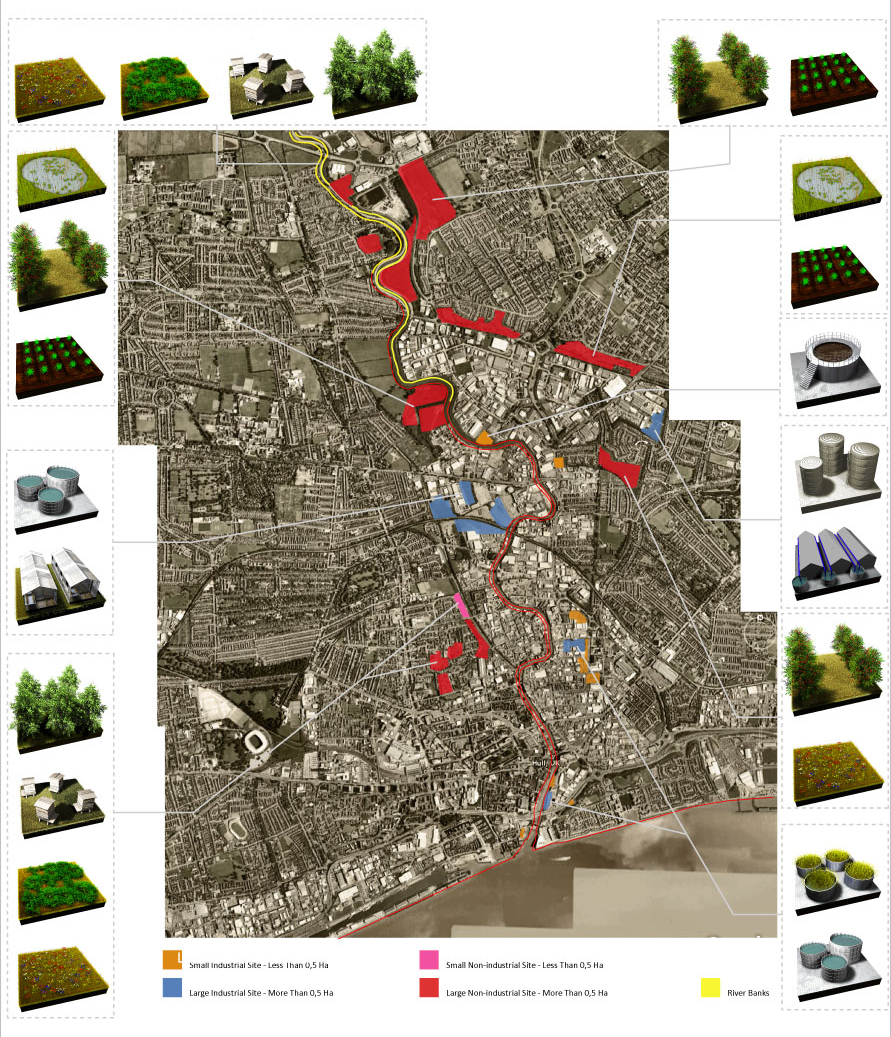
The Seed Catalogue

Susannah Hagan, FRSA (born 1951) is the founding Director of R_E_D (Research into Environment + Design) and Professor and School Research Leader at the Royal College of Art School of Architecture. She has written and lectured extensively on the theory and practice of environmental design, in particular, environmentally led urban design. Hagan's major publications include City Fights: Debates on Sustainable Cities (James & James (Science) Publishers, London, 2000); Taking Shape: A New Contract between Architecture and Nature (Architectural Press, Oxford, 2001); and Digitalia: Architecture and the Environmental, the Digital and the Avant-garde (Routledge, London, 2008).

== Biography ==
Hagan was born in London and raised in England and the United States. She studied English and French literature at Yale University in New Haven, Connecticut, receiving a Bachelor of Arts with Honors degree in 1973. She then moved to New York City, where she attended the Graduate School of Architecture at Columbia University, earning a Master of Architecture degree in 1978. As part of her architectural studies, Hagan spent a year abroad as an exchange student at the Architectural Association School of Architecture in London.

Susannah Hagan moved from United States to London in 1991 to pursue her studies in architectural history and theory, first at the Architectural Association Graduate School and then at Birkbeck, University of London. In 1999, Hagan was awarded a Doctor of Philosophy degree from the University of London. In 2002 and 2003, she pursued postdoctoral research at the University of Cambridge, completing the Master of Philosophy Program in Environmental Design and Architecture.

She taught on the faculty of the Environment and Energy Masters Program at the Architectural Association from 1996 to 2002, and in 2002, was invited to set up a new Masters Program at the University of East London. The MA Architecture: Sustainability + Design was the first to completely integrate the relevant technology and social theory with design. From 2009 to 2011, Hagan was Professor of Urban Studies and Director of the Office of Spatial Research at the University of Brighton.

Her work with R_E_D includes EMPTYing CITIES, Wuppertal, Germany, 2004–05, research-by-design into the problem of "shrinking cities," post-industrial cities losing population; EnLUDe 1 (Environmentally Led Urban DEsign), São Paulo, Brazil, 2005–07, a pilot research project with the LCAEE, University of São Paulo, involving environmentally led urban design on a large brownfield site earmarked for development by the city of São Paulo; and EnLUDe 2, Royal Docks, London, 2007–08, research-by-design into an environmentally led spatial planning on a high risk floodplain in the Thames Gateway.

In addition to her books on the relationship between environmental design and contemporary architecture and urban design, Hagan has also contributed to numerous others, including Nature, Landscape and Building for Sustainability (University of Minnesota Press, Minneapolis, 2008) and Ecological Urbanism (Lars Müller Publishers, Baden, 2010), and to journals ranging from the Architectural Review to the Harvard Design Magazine. She has lectured internationally, including the Union of Baltic Cities Commission on Urban Planning, the annual NUTAU conference, São Paulo, the Moderna Museet, Stockholm, and the Victoria and Albert Museum, London.

== Awards and recognition ==
Hagan is a Fellow of the Institute for Urban Design, New York, and a Fellow of the Royal Society for the encouragement of Arts, Manufactures & Commerce (RSA), and a member of the International Development Network, the Royal Town Planning Institute, and the Newham Borough Design Review Panel. Hagan was a finalist in the 2008/09 James Stirling Memorial Lecture Competition. In September 2010, "The Seed Catalogue, " an urban design competition entry submitted by Hagan, Silvio Caputo, and Mark Gaterell, was premiated in the international Integrated Habitats Design Competition.

== Selected bibliography ==
- City Fights: Debates on Sustainable Cities, James & James (Science) Publishers, London, 2000. Co-editor and contributor with Mark Hewitt.
- Taking Shape: The New Contract between Architecture and Nature, Architectural Press, Oxford, 2001.
- More with Less, MCA Mario Cucinella Architects, “Integrated Design, or the art of both/and,” Mandragora s.r.l., Florence, 2002.
- Digitalia: Architecture and the Environmental, the Digital and the Avant-garde, Routledge, London, 2008.
- CPULS – Continuous Productive Landscapes, ed. Andre Viljoen, “Plant It,” Architectural Press, Oxford 2005.
- Material Matters, ed. Katy Lloyd-Thomas, "The New and the Renewed," Routledge, London, 2006.
- Nature, Landscape and Building for Sustainability, ed. William Saunders, “Five Reasons to Adopt Environmental Design,” University of Minnesota Press, Minneapolis, London, 2008.
- Skidmore, Owings and Merrill Journal, “Sustaining Architecture during a Revolution,” eds. Juhani Pallasmaa, Kenneth Frampton, New York, 2008.
- Ecological Urbanism, Harvard Graduate School of Design, “Performalism: Environmental Metrics and Urban Design,” Lars Müller Publishers, Baden, Switzerland, Nov 2009.
- Harvard Design Magazine, “Five Reasons (to adopt environmental design),” spring/summer 2003, ed. William S. Saunders, Harvard University Graduate School of Design, Boston.
- Building Material, ed. Gary Boyd, “Shiny, or is new always better?,” Issue 12, autumn 2004, Architectural Association of Ireland, Dublin.
- Harvard Design Magazine, “New and Post-Urbanisms,” May 2005, ed. William S. Saunders, Harvard University Graduate School of Design, Boston.
- Ehitukunst, ed. Epp Lankots, “Five reasons (to adopt environmental design),” (Latvian translation), February 2007.
- Arkitekturmuseet Yearbook, Global Cities, “The City as Artificial Ecology: Performativity and Productivity in the ‘Sustainable City,’” Stockholm, 2008.
