= Elizabeth Kutter =

American phage biologist

Dr. Elizabeth (Betty) Kutter (11 August 1939-18 July 2026) was a phage biologist based at the Evergreen State College in Olympia, Washington, USA, where she was a Professor Emeritus. She led the T4 Genome Sequencing project, and organized the biennial Evergreen International Phage Biology meetings that draw hundreds of phage researchers from all over the world.

== Early life and career ==
Kutter attended Garfield High School in Seattle from 1953 to 1958. Her father was an electrical engineer working at Boeing, and she credits him for her mathematical ability. From 1956 to 1957 she traveled as an exchange student to Braunschweig, Germany. After she finished high school, she did her bachelor's degree in theoretical mathematics at the University of Washington in Seattle, where she graduated top in her class in 1962.

From here, she moved to the University of Rochester in New York where she completed her PhD in the Department of Radiation Biology and Biophysics in 1968. Although initially unsure about the direction her research should take, a lunch with visiting postdoctoral John Wiberg, who was then working in the lab of Salvador Luria, clarified her interest in bacteriophages. He moved to Rochester and she completed her studies as his first student, writing her thesis on the topic of how T4 phage hijacks the metabolism of its host. Salvador Luria would later quote her PhD research in his Nobel Prize talk.

During her university studies, she married German astrophysicist G Siegfried Kutter, and had two sons.

From 1969 to 1972, she worked in the lab of Rolf Benzinger at the University of Virginia. She was awarded a grant from the National Science Foundation (NSF), and later a grant from the National Institute of Health (NIH). There was little support for women in the department at this time, and although she applied for a faculty position, her application was denied on the basis that it was not a suitable position for a young mother.

== Evergreen Bacteriophage Lab ==
In 1972, Kutter met with two deans of a new college in Washington, the Evergreen State College, who were in Virginia on a recruitment trip. Both her and her husband were offered jobs as faculty, and she moved to Olympia with her family at the start of 1973 to set up a new lab, bringing her NIH grant with her. Her early work focused on molecular biology and specifically on T4, and in 1975 she joined the National Recombinant DNA Advisory Committee. In 1978 she took a sabbatical year to work with Bruce Alberts at UC San Francisco, and it was this work that resulted in her leading the T4 genome sequencing project alongside collaborators from the USSR, Japan, and Germany, including Gisela Mosig. At just under 169 kB, the T4 genome was the largest ever sequenced at this time, and the effort took fifteen years.

In 1990, Kutter participated in a four-month research exchange with the USSR Academy of Sciences. It was here that she first learnt about phage therapy, and this led to several trips to Tbilisi and a close collaborative relationship with scientists at the Eliava Institute. In 1996, she set up the Phagebiotics Research Foundation, with the aim to publicize and support international phage therapy research.

=== Evergreen International Phage Biology Meetings ===
Intended as a successor to the regular meeting held by the Phage Group at the Cold Spring Harbor Laboratory, the first West Coast T4 meeting was held at the Evergreen Bacteriophage Lab in 1975. This later developed into the biennial Evergreen International Phage Biology meetings. These meetings draw hundreds of participants from all over the world. Much like Kutter's work more generally, their early incarnations were focused on T4 phage, and they later expanded to be about phage research more broadly. The most recent meeting was held in 2021.

== Selected publications ==
- O'Farrell, Patrick H.; Kutter, Elizabeth; Nakanishi, Mikiye (September 1980). "A restriction map of the bacteriophage T4 genome". Molecular and General Genetics. 179 (2): 421–435. doi:10.1007/BF00425473. PMC 2868831. PMID 6258018.
- Miller, Eric S.; Kutter, Elizabeth; Mosig, Gisela; Arisaka, Fumio; Kunisawa, Takashi; Rüger, Wolfgang (March 2003). "Bacteriophage T4 Genome". Microbiology and Molecular Biology Reviews. 67 (1): 86–156. doi:10.1128/MMBR.67.1.86-156.2003. PMC 150520. PMID 12626685.
- Guttmann, Burton; Raya, Raul; Kutter, Elizabeth (2004). "Basic Phage Biology". In Elizabeth Kutter; Alexander Sulakvelidze (eds.). Bacteriophages: Biology and Applications. CRC Press. doi:10.1201/9780203491751. ISBN 978-0-8493-1336-3.
- Sulakvelidze, Alexander; Kutter, Elizabeth (2004). "Bacteriophage Therapy in Humans". In Elizabeth Kutter; Alexander Sulakvelidze (eds.). Bacteriophages: Biology and Applications. CRC Press. doi:10.1201/9780203491751. ISBN 978-0-8493-1336-3.
- Kutter, Elizabeth (2009). "Phage Host Range and Efficiency of Plating". Methods in Molecular Biology. Vol. 501. Humana Press. pp. 141–149. doi:10.1007/978-1-60327-164-6_14. ISBN 978-1-58829-682-5. PMID 19066818.
- Kutter, Elizabeth; De Vos, Daniel; Gvasalia, Guram; Alavidze, Zemphira; Gogokhia, Lasha; Kuhl, Sarah; Abedon, Stephen (1 January 2010). "Phage Therapy in Clinical Practice: Treatment of Human Infections". Current Pharmaceutical Biotechnology. 11 (1): 69–86. doi:10.2174/138920110790725401. PMID 20214609.
- Abedon, Stephen T.; Kuhl, Sarah J.; Blasdel, Bob G.; Kutter, Elizabeth Martin (March 2011). "Phage treatment of human infections". Bacteriophage. 1 (2): 66–85. doi:10.4161/bact.1.2.15845. PMC 3278644. PMID 22334863.
