= Stephen Hagan =

Stephen Hagan may refer to:

- Stephen Hagan (author), Australian author and anti-racism campaigner
- Stephen Hagan (actor), actor from Northern Ireland
