= Jacqueline Hagan =

Chilean-born American sociologist

- Born: Jacqueline Maria Hagan; August 28, 1954 (age 71); Chile
- Education: George Washington University; University of Texas at Austin
- Known for: Immigration to the United States from Latin America
- Awards: Elected member of the Sociological Research Association (2017)
- Scientific career
- Fields: Sociology
- Institutions: University of Houston; University of North Carolina at Chapel Hill
- Thesis: The legalization experience of a Mayan community in Houston (1990)
- Doctoral advisors: Harley Browning; Bryan Roberts

Jacqueline Maria Hagan (born August 28, 1954) is a Chilean-born American sociologist who has been the Kenan Professor of Sociology at the University of North Carolina at Chapel Hill since 2017. She is known for her research on immigration from Latin America to the United States, and on the effects of the United States' immigration policies on immigrants. This work has included studies of the social effects of deportations of undocumented immigrants to their home countries, and research on changes in the frequency of different causes of migrant deaths along the Mexico–United States border.

== Career ==
After receiving her Ph.D. from the University of Texas at Austin in 1990, Hagan joined the faculty of the University of Houston as an assistant professor, where she became an associate professor and the co-director of the Center for Immigration Research in 1995. In 2005, she joined the faculty of the University of North Carolina at Chapel Hill (UNC-Chapel Hill) as an associate professor of sociology, where she was named a full professor in 2009. From 2012 to 2016, she was the Robert G. Parr Distinguished Term Professor of Sociology at UNC-Chapel Hill.

== Publications ==
- Deciding to be legal : a Maya community in Houston, 1994
- Social networks, gender and immigrant settlement : resource and constraint, 1996
- Central Americans in the United States, 1996
- Migration miracle : faith, hope, and meaning on the undocumented journey, 2008
- Skills of the "unskilled" : work and mobility among Mexican migrants, 2015
