= Devon (European Parliament constituency) =

Former European Parliament constituency

- European Parliament constituency
- Boundary within South West England (1979-1984)
- Member state: United Kingdom
- Created: 1979
- Dissolved: 1994
- MEPs: 1

Devon was a European Parliament constituency covering all of Devon in England, with the exception of the city of Plymouth.

Prior to its uniform adoption of proportional representation in 1999, the United Kingdom used first-past-the-post for the European elections in England, Scotland and Wales. The European Parliament constituencies used under that system were smaller than the later regional constituencies and only had one Member of the European Parliament each.

When it was created in England in 1979, it consisted of the Westminster Parliament constituencies of Devon North, Devon West, Exeter, Honiton, Tiverton, Torbay and Totnes. In 1984, Totnes was replaced by South Hams and Teignbridge, while Devon West was replaced by Devon West and Torridge. During the fifteen-year existence of the Devon European Parliamentary constituency, it was represented by Charles Strachey, 4th Baron O'Hagan, until his resignation in 1994.

The constituency was replaced by Devon and East Plymouth and parts of Dorset and East Devon and Somerset and North Devon in 1994. These seats became part of the much larger South West England constituency in 1999.

Boundary within South West England (1984-1994)

== Members of the European Parliament ==
Elected	Name	Party
1979	Lord O'Hagan	Conservative

== Results ==
European Parliament election, 1979: Devon
Party	Candidate	Votes	%	±%
Conservative	Lord O'Hagan	127,032	61.8	
Liberal	Ted Pinney	41,010	20.0	
Labour	Reg C. J. Scott	37,380	18.2	
Majority		86,022	41.8	
Turnout		205,422	38.5	
Conservative win (new seat)				

European Parliament election, 1984: Devon
Party	Candidate	Votes	%	±%
Conservative	Lord O'Hagan	110,129	54.7	−7.1
Liberal	Peter Driver	53,519	26.6	+6.6
Labour	David Gorbutt	30,017	14.9	−3.3
Ecology	Peter Christie	6,919	3.5	New
Wessex Regionalist	Henrietta E. Rous	659	0.3	New
Majority		56,620	28.1	−13.7
Turnout		201,243	35.9	−2.6
Conservative hold		Swing		

European Parliament election, 1989: Devon
Party	Candidate	Votes	%	±%
Conservative	Lord O'Hagan	110,518	46.4	−8.3
Green	Peter Christie	53,220	22.3	+18.8
Labour	Walter Cairns	40,675	17.1	+2.2
SLD	Mike Edmunds	23,306	9.8	−16.8
SDP	R. C. (Bob) Edwards	7,806	3.3	New
Monster Raving Loony	Stuart Hughes	2,241	0.9	New
Wessex Regionalist	Henrietta E. Rous	385	0.2	−0.1
Majority		57,298	24.1	−4.0
Turnout		230,345	39.9	+4.0
Conservative hold		Swing		
