= Philip Thurtle =

Historian, biologist, academic, and author

Phillip Thurtle
- Born
- Occupations: Historian, biologist, academic and author

Academic background
- Education: BS; MA., American History; PhD., History and Philosophy of Technology and Science
- Alma mater: Evergreen State College; Stanford University

Academic work
- Institutions: University of Washington

Phillip Thurtle is a historian, biologist, academic, and author. He is a professor in the Departments of the Comparative History of Ideas and History and an adjunct professor in Digital and Experimental Arts at the University of Washington.

Thurtle's research focuses on the emotional and experiential aspects of media, the impact of information processing technologies on biomedical research, and theories of innovation in the life sciences. His publications comprise research articles and books including Data Made Flesh: Embodying Information, The Emergence of Genetic Rationality: Space, Time, and Information in American Biology and Biology in the Grid: Graphic Design and the Envisioning of the Life. He has received awards from the University of Washington, such as the 2013 Distinguished Teaching Award and the 2020 Undergraduate Research Mentor Award, along with the Digital Humanities Fellowship from the Walter Chapin Simpson Center for the Humanities in 2015 and 2018.

Thurtle is a Series Co-editor of In Vivo: Cultural Mediations of Biomedicine, and is a member of the editorial board of Humanities Net as well as the advisory board of Inflexions: A Journal for Research-Creation.

== Education and early career ==
Thurtle graduated with a Bachelor of Science from Evergreen State College in 1983 and was later enrolled at Stanford University, where he received a Master of Arts in American History in 1994, followed by a PhD in History and Philosophy of Technology and Science in 2002. During this time, he began his academic career as a Visiting Lecturer at the University of Washington School of Communications from 1997 to 2001.

== Career ==
Thurtle continued his career as a Visiting Assistant Professor for Communication and the Comparative History of Ideas Program at the University of Washington, while also being an assistant professor of Sociology and Anthropology with appointments in the Graduate Faculty in Environmental Studies and the Institute of Political Economy at Carleton University from 2002 to 2005. In 2005, he was appointed assistant professor at the University of Washington in Comparative History of Ideas and History, later assuming the role of associate professor in 2008 and has been serving as Professor since 2018.

Thurtle served as Director of the Comparative History of Ideas program from 2010 to 2013, followed by acting director from 2016 to 2017. He then served as the first Chair of Comparative History Department from 2018–2021 and interim Chair from 2021–2022.

== Research ==
Thurtle has contributed to the fields of history of science and technology and molecular immunology by investigating genetic thinking, the influence of information on the body, and the impact of graphic design on biological understanding and societal beliefs. His book, The Emergence of Genetic Rationality: Space, Time, and Information in American Biological Science, 1870–1920, explored the transformations required to enable genetic thinking, incorporating insights from social theory, media theory, and intellectual history, and was called a "fascinating and wide-ranging book" by academic Michael Dietrich. He co-edited two books with Robert Mitchell focusing on how information reshapes the human body: Semiotic Flesh: Information and the Human Body and Data Made Flesh: Embodying Information as well as co-authored an interactive DVD Biofutures: Owning Body Parts and Information with Mitchell and Helen J. Burgess. In a review for the MIT Press, Eugene Thacker stated, "Data Made Flesh is interesting because I believe it asks us to begin to think beyond the phenomenological and anthropomorphic vantage point of "embodiment.""

In 2018, Thurtle authored Biology in the Grid: Graphic Design and the Envisioning of Life, examining how evolutionary and developmental biology research, as well as popular culture, depict cellular and cultural transformations. Amy Ione remarked, "It impressively conveys how contemporary tools that capture motion have altered traditional distinctions between time, space, linearity, and so forth."

Thurtle's publications have also addressed topics such as superheroes and embodiment, biofeedback in music, the naturalist and eugenicist David Starr Jordan, and the plant hybridizer Luther Burbank. Together with Adam Nocek, he edited a special issue of Inflexions titled "Animating Biophilosophy," which looked into the changing relationship between thought and life in the late twentieth century. In another collaborative study, he argued that superhero comic books act as a "logic of the anomalous," allowing readers to explore societal anomalies and extreme experiences, connecting political economy, media theory, and science and technology studies. His research also showed how Gilded Age trotting horse breeders' practices influenced the development of genetic reasoning in the U.S., linking industrial growth to the rise of eugenic and genetic research.

== Awards and honors ==
- 2013 – Distinguished Teaching Award, University of Washington
- 2015, 2018 – Digital Humanities Fellowship, Walter Chapin Simpson Center for the Humanities
- 2020 – Undergraduate Research Mentor Award, University of Washington

== Bibliography ==
=== Books ===
- Semiotic Flesh: Information and the Human Body (2002) ISBN 978-0295982007
- Data Made Flesh: Embodying Information (2003) ISBN 978-0415969055
- The Emergence of Genetic Rationality: Space, Time, and Information in American Biology (2007) ISBN 978-0295987569
- Biology in the Grid: Graphic Design and the Envisioning of the Life (2018) ISBN 978-1517902773

=== Selected articles ===
- Thurtle, P. (2002). Harnessing heredity in Gilded Age America: Middle class mores and industrial breeding in a cultural context. Journal of the History of Biology, 35, 43–78.
- Thurtle, P., & Mitchell, R. (2007). The Acme Novelty Library: Comic Books, Repetition, and the Return of the New. Configurations, 15(3), 267–297.
- Thurtle, P. (2014). Animation and Vitality. Inflexions: A Journal for Research Creation, 7.
- Thurtle, P. (2020). Alienated Life: toward a goth theory of biology. Angelaki, 25(3), 53–63.
- Mengist, N., Sidibe, M., Biggs, H., Fox, T., Thurtle, P., & Desjardins, A. (2021). World building: Creating alternate worlds as meaningful making in undergraduate education. art, design & communication in higher education, 20(1), 29–47.
