= Robert Hagan =

Robert Hagan may refer to:

- Robert E. Hagan (1921–1999), American politician in Ohio
- Bob Hagan (Robert F. Hagan, born 1949), his son, American politician in Ohio
- Robert Hagan (artist) (born 1947), Australian television personality, author and artist
- Robert Hagan (Royal Navy officer) (1794–1863), officer in the British Royal Navy
