= Hanggin =

Hanggin may refer to:

- Hanggin Banner, in Ordos, Inner Mongolia, China
- Hanggin Rear Banner, in Bayan Nur, Inner Mongolia, China
