= Ellen Hagan =

Ghanaian entrepreneur

Ellen Hagan is a Ghanaian entrepreneur, human resource practitioner and the CEO of L'aine Services Limited. She is a co-founder of Legacy Girls College.

== Education ==
She was educated at Wesley Girls High School in Cape Coast in the Central Region of Ghana, before graduating from the University Of Ghana. She holds an MBA degree from the Graduate School of the University of Leicester.

== Business career ==
Hagan established L'aine Services Limited and also co-founded the Legacy Leadership Girls School in Akuse.

She partners with the counselling unit of the University of Ghana, Central University and Ashesi University to offer presentations on the corporate world, internship programs and how to run them well.

Hagan serves on several boards, including the University of Ghana Business School board and the Danish Sounding board. She was formally a delegate to ILO conferences on several occasions representing the Ghana Employers Association.

She was appointed as the Vice President of the Bible Society of Ghana in 2023.

== Personal life ==
She is married and has four children and six grandchildren.

== Awards ==
- CIMG Marketing Woman Of The Year 2011
- Strategic Leadership Awards 2011 World HRD Congress in India.
- Africa's Most Influential Woman In Business 2013
- The Ultimate Woman Of The Year at the 2017 Emy Awards
- Women Arising Entrepreneur Of The Year 2017
- VLISCO Be Your Dream Award 2013
- Outstanding Female Entrepreneur at the Ghana Women Awards 2013
- Best Entrepreneur in Corporate Business 2013

== Writings ==
- Soft Skills; What Gives One Job Seeker An Edge Over Another
- All About Job Interviews
- Why are you here
- A Voice of Leadership and Legacy
