= John O'Hagan (judge) =

Irish lawyer and writer

John O'Hagan (born 19 March 1822 at Newry, County Down; died 10 November 1890 at Howth, County Dublin) was an Irish lawyer and writer. He was also an Irish Nationalist and Younger Irelander, and was a founding member of the first Irish conference of the Society of Saint Vincent de Paul.

== Life ==
He was educated in the day-school of the Jesuit Fathers, Dublin, and in Trinity College, Dublin, graduating in 1842. An advocate of Catholic university education, he contributed to the Dublin Review (1847) an article which the Catholic Truth Society of Ireland reprinted under the title "Trinity College No Place for Catholics".

In 1842 he was called to the Bar and joined the Munster Circuit. In 1861 he was appointed a Commissioner of National Education, and in 1865 he became Q.C. The same year he married Frances, daughter of the first Lord O'Hagan.

While in London in the Spring of 1845, O'Hagan, along with John Edward Pigot and Charles Gavan Duffy paid a call on Thomas Carlyle and his wife Jane Carlyle in order to defend the Irish and Irish Nationalism against Carlyle's attacks in On Chartism and other works. In his 1892 Conversations with Carlyle, Duffy recounts this initial meeting and quotes from Jane Carlyle's half-burnt diary that had been rescued from a general fire meant to destroy all of her personal memoirs. Here Jane commented on meeting for the first time "real hot and hot live Irishmen" such as she had "never seen before" (J. Carlyle qtd. in Duffy, 1892, p. 1). While "no blood was shed" during this friendly but combative meeting, O'Hagan's nose began to bleed profusely. Jane Carlyle writes: "while they were all three at the loudest defence [sic] of Ireland against the foul aspersions Carlyle had . . . 'scornfully' cast on it, [O'Hagan's nose] . . . burst out bleeding. He let it bleed into his pocket-handkerchief privately til nature was relieved, and was more cautious of exciting himself afterwards" (Jane Carlyle qtd. in Duffy, Conversations with Carlyle, 1892, p. 3).

After Gladstone had passed his Land Law (Ireland) Act 1881, he chose O'Hagan as the first judicial head of the Irish Land Commission, making him for this purpose a judge of Her Majesty's High Court of Justice.

He was a friend of John Kells Ingram, an Irish economist, poet and patriot.

After his death, his widow Frances joined the Franciscan Monastery of St Mary of the Angels at Drumshanbo, Co Leitrim.

== Works ==
He was an earnest Catholic, as is shown in many of his writings, such as "The Children's Ballad Rosary". His poems, "Dear Land", "Ourselves Alone", etc., were among the most effective features of The Nation in its brilliant youth.

In his last years he published the first English translation of La Chanson de Roland and a translation of the Adoro te devote
