= Lyn Hagan =

Lyn Hagan is a Newcastle based writer and artist, also founding director of LifeInSpace. Her work principally tries to negotiate and transcend established ideas of theatricality and aesthetics. As such, her work typically manifests itself through either its destruction or impermanence and in spaces that would not properly be considered stages and with non-typical ‘actors’ in chaotic interactions.

Lyn has written, produced and directed a 9-hour performance piece ‘Letter to Daddy’ based upon principles of exhaustion and repetition which used four scenes from the film ‘Whatever happened to Baby Jane?’ as well as written a novel ‘There’s No Place Like Home’ about the last day in an asylum for the Surrealist playwright Antonin Artaud. Her current work is the Cat and Mouse in 0g that situates the animals as actors in a staged environment of a parabolic aeroplane. The flight took place at the Yuri Gagarin Cosmonaut Training Centre in Star City, Russia on 8 July 2008. The piece formed through their reactions to one another and the environment over the repeated parabolas and states of weightlessness.

After interest from a project scientist at ESA, she is simultaneously beginning to structure a project that may see art on Mars for the next ExoMars Rover mission. Her suggestion is to choreograph a dance for the robot on Mars for when the scientific mission is over using its autonomous navigation system.

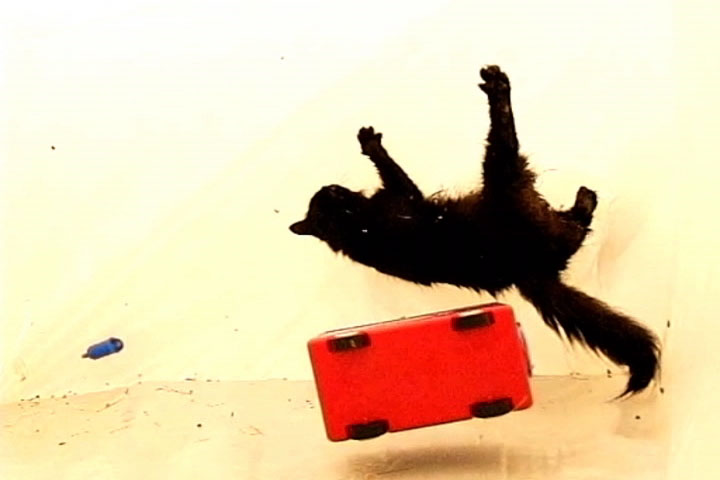

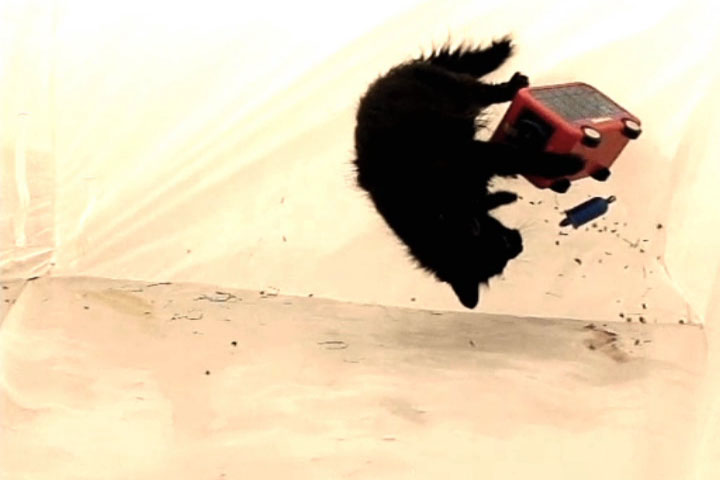

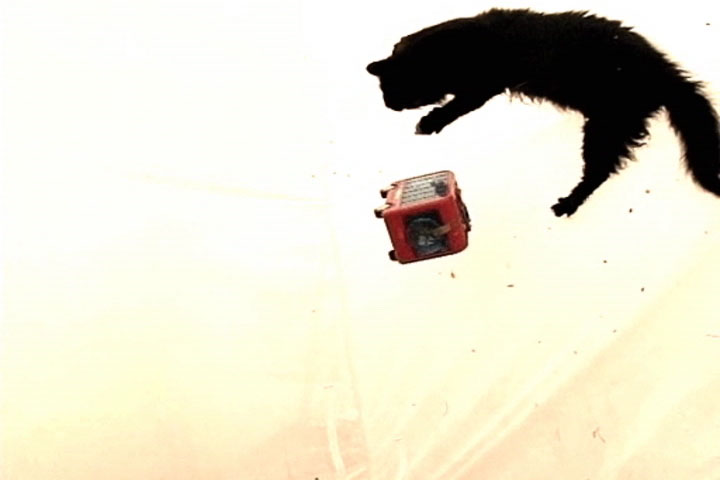

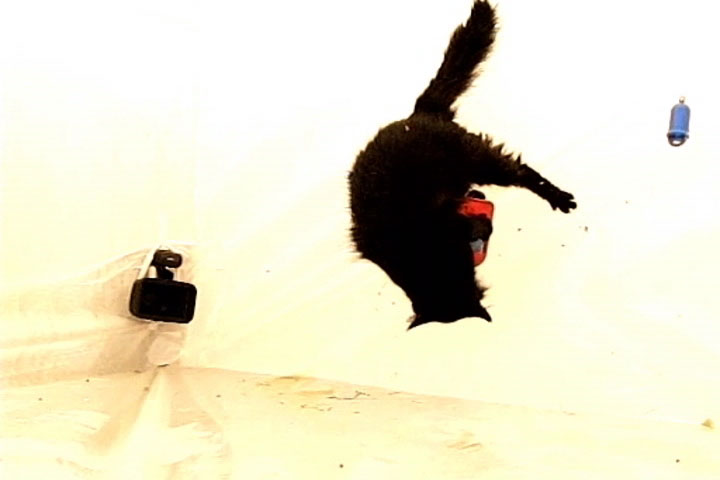
