= Edward James Hagan =

Scottish minister and biblical scholar

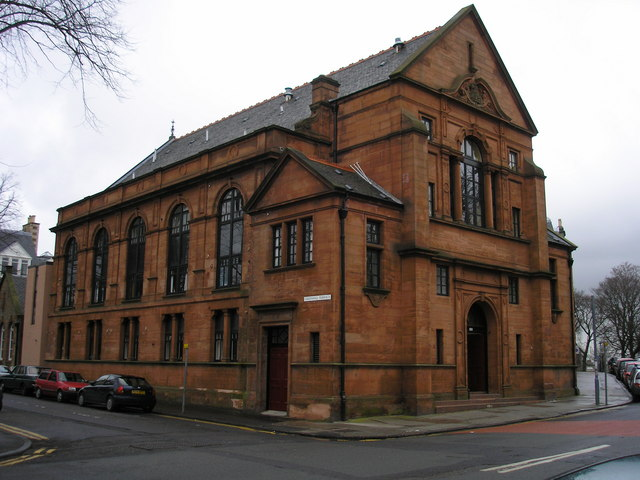
Warrender Parish Church, Edinburgh (now converted to flats)

Edward James Hagan OBE MC (1879–1956) was a 20th-century Scottish minister and biblical scholar. He served as Moderator of the General Assembly of the Church of Scotland in 1944.

== Life ==
He studied divinity at Queen's University, Belfast graduating BA. He was ordained in the United Free Church of Scotland around 1902.

He served as a chaplain attached to the 15th Scottish Division in the First World War and received a military OBE and the Military Cross.

In 1922 he received an honorary doctorate (DD).

He became minister of Warrender Church, sited near Bruntsfield Links in south-west Edinburgh. He served here 1926 to 1951. In 1929 the United Free Church of Scotland re-united with the Church of Scotland and he thereafter served as a minister of the Church of Scotland. His church survives but was converted to flats in the 1980s.

In 1944 he succeeded Very Rev John Baillie as Moderator of the General Assembly.

He retired in 1951 and died in 1956.
