= Hagon =

Hagon is a surname. Notable people with the surname include:

- Alf Hagon (born 1931), English motorcycle racer
- Garrick Hagon (born 1939), British-Canadian actor
- Rex Hagon (born 1947), Canadian actor and television host

== See also ==
- Hagan (surname)
- Hagon Beck, a river of Norfolk, England
