= Bill Hagan =

Canadian ice hockey player

- Born: June 17, 1931 (age 95) Barrie, Ontario, Canada
- Height: 5 ft 11 in (180 cm)
- Weight: 160 lb (73 kg; 11 st 6 lb)
- Position: Left wing
- Shot: Left
- Played for: Barrie Flyers; Vancouver Canucks; Buffalo Bisons
- Playing career: 1949–1957

Bill Hagan (born June 17, 1931) is a Canadian former professional ice hockey left winger, who was a member of the Jr. A Barrie Flyers under Hap Emms, who won the Memorial Cup in 1950–51.

== Career ==
Hagan also played in the AHL with the Buffalo Bisons in 1951–52. He also played for the Vancouver Canucks of the PCHL in 1951–52, the Vancouver Canucks of the WHL in 1952–53, the Charlottetown Islanders of the MMHL in 1952–53, and the Troy Uncle Sam's Trojans of the EHL in 1952–53. Hagan then played three years in the OHA Sr. A leagues for the Owen Sound Mercurys 1954–57.
