= James Hagan =

James Hagan may refer to:

- James Hagan (bishop) (1904–1976), English Roman Catholic bishop
- James Hagan (Confederate colonel) (1822–1901), United States Army captain and Confederate States Army colonel
- James B. Hagan (1923–1988), member of the Ohio House of Representatives
- James E. Hagan (1902–1965), American businessman and politician in the Massachusetts House of Representatives
- Jim Hagan (born 1956), Northern Irish former professional footballer and manager
- Jim Hagan (basketball) (born 1936), American basketball player
- Jimmy Hagan (1918–1998), English football player and manager
