= Holly Hagan (epidemiologist) =

American epidemiologist and nurse

Academic background
- Education: BA, Russian Studies, Evergreen State College; MPH, Epidemiology, University of Massachusetts Amherst; PhD, University of Washington

Holly C. Hagan is an American infectious disease epidemiologist and nurse. She is a full professor in the College of Global Public Health at New York University and director of the Center for Drug Use and HIV/HCV Research.

== Early life and education ==
Hagan earned her Bachelor of Arts degree from Evergreen State College, her Master's degree from the University of Massachusetts, Amherst, and PhD from the University of Washington.

== Career ==
Upon completing her PhD, Hagan accepted a faculty position at New York University (NYU) College of Global Public Health. As a senior research scientist, Hagan and Sherry Deren were appointed co-editors of the Substance Use & Misuse special issue on "The New York HIV-Drug Use Epidemic: Lessons Learned and Unresolved Issues." Throughout her tenure at NYU, she studied epidemiology, prevention, natural history and treatment of hepatitis C virus infection in people who use drugs as co-director of the Center for Drug Use and HIV/HCV Research. In 2018, Hagan was appointed chair of the Executive Steering Committee for the National Institutes of Health and the Centers for Disease Control and Prevention’s Rural Opioid Initiative. She was also named to the National Academy of Medicine's Committee on the Examination of the Integration of Opioid and Infectious Disease Prevention Efforts in Select Programs.

During the COVID-19 pandemic in North America, Hagan and Vincent Guilamo-Ramos were the principal investigators of a National Institutes of Health study aimed at providing personalized health care to those in public housing. The funds were used to implement and evaluate a household-centered service-delivery that sent nurses and community health workers door-to-door in public housing to prevent the spread of coronavirus.
