= Thomas Towneley O'Hagan, 2nd Baron O'Hagan =

British peer and army officer (1878–1900)

Thomas Towneley O'Hagan, 2nd Baron O'Hagan (5 December 1878 – 13 December 1900), was a British peer and soldier.

He was the eldest son of Thomas O'Hagan, the Lord Chancellor of Ireland in Gladstone's first two governments, and of Alice Towneley from Lancashire's prominent Towneley family, from whom he inherited considerable land holdings of some 5,300 acres (21 km^{2}).

He was educated at Sandhurst. He inherited his title at the age of seven, but never took up his seat in the House of Lords before his premature death.

From 1899, he served in South Africa during Boer War as a lieutenant in the 3rd Battalion of Grenadier Guards, but died abruptly of an unknown illness (thought to have been malaria) just over a week after his 22nd birthday. As he died unmarried and without children, the title passed on to his younger brother Maurice.

Coat of arms of Thomas Towneley O'Hagan, 2nd Baron O'Hagan
Crest 1st on a Roman fasces lying fesswise Proper a cubit arm vested Gules cuffed Ermine the hand holding a dagger erect both Proper (O’Hagan) 2nd on a perch Or a hawk close Proper beaked and belled Gold jessed Gules (Towneley). Escutcheon Quarterly 1st & 4th Ermine a bend Azure on a chief of the last a fleur-de-lys Or (O’Hagan) 2nd & 3rd Argent a fess Sable in chief three mullets of the second (Towneley). Supporters Two lions Or collared gemel Sable pendent therefrom an escutcheon Argent charged with a hand couped Gules. Motto Mihi Res Non Me Rebus.

Peerage of the United Kingdom
Preceded by Thomas O'Hagan	Baron O'Hagan; 1885–1900	Succeeded by Maurice Herbert Towneley Towneley-O'Hagan
