= Wayne Au =

American educational researcher (born 1972)

- Born: 1972 (age 53–54)
- Spouse: Mira Shimabukuro
- Children: 1

Academic background
- Education: Evergreen State College; University of Wisconsin–Madison

Academic work
- Institutions: University of Washington Bothell

Wayne Wah Kwai Au (born 1972) is an American educational researcher and professor in the School of Educational Studies at the University of Washington Bothell. Since August 1, 2022, he was also the interim dean of the School of Educational Studies, a position held until June 20, 2024. His research focuses on critical theory and the application of social justice in education.

== Education and career ==
The son of a white mother and a Chinese American father, Au graduated from Garfield High School in Seattle, Washington. He then attended Evergreen State College in Olympia, from which he earned his bachelor's degree in 1994 and his master's degree in 1996, both in teaching. In 2007, he earned his Ph.D. in curriculum and instruction from the University of Wisconsin–Madison. He joined the faculty of the University of Washington Bothell (UWB) in 2010 after teaching at California State University, Fullerton for three years. From 2018 to 2020, he was the interim dean of diversity and equity at UWB.
