= Joseph Hagan =

American politician

Member of New Hampshire House of Representatives for Rockingham 4
- In office 2008 – December 4, 2018

Personal details
- Party: Republican
- Education: Drexel University; Troy University

Joseph M. Hagan is an American politician. He was a member of the New Hampshire House of Representatives and represented Rockingham 4th district from 2008 to 2018.
