= John Hagan =

John Hagan may refer to:

- John Hagan (1785?–1856), American slave trader
- John N. Hagan (1873–1952), North Dakota politician
- John Hagan (sailor) (born 1946), eighth Master Chief Petty Officer of the Navy
- John L. Hagan, American sociologist
- John Hagan (Ohio politician), former Republican member of the Ohio House of Representatives
