= Thomas O'Hagan, 1st Baron O'Hagan =

Lord Chancellor of Ireland in 19th century

The Right Honourable The Lord O'Hagan KP PC QC
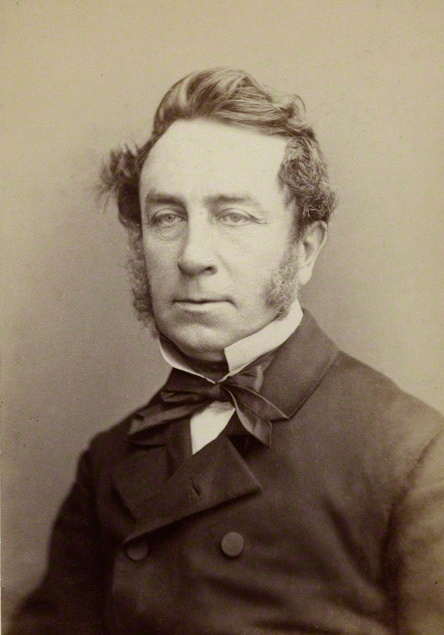
- Lord O'Hagan, c. 1868.

Lord Chancellor of Ireland
- In office 1868–1874
- Monarch: Victoria
- Prime Minister: William Ewart Gladstone
- Preceded by: Abraham Brewster
- Succeeded by: In commission
- In office 1880–1881
- Monarch: Victoria
- Prime Minister: William Ewart Gladstone
- Preceded by: John Thomas Ball
- Succeeded by: Hugh Law

Personal details
- Born: 29 May 1812 Belfast
- Died: 1 February 1885 (aged 72) Hereford House, London
- Party: Liberal

Thomas O'Hagan, 1st Baron O'Hagan, KP, PC (Ire), QC (29 May 1812 – 1 February 1885), was an Irish lawyer and judge. He served as Lord Chancellor of Ireland from 1868 to 1874 and again from 1880 to 1881.

== Background and education ==
O'Hagan was born in Belfast, the son of Edward O'Hagan, a merchant, and his wife Mary Bell, daughter of Captain Thomas Bell. He was educated at Royal Belfast Academical Institution, being in his day the only Catholic in the school. In 1836 he was called to the Irish Bar.

== Career ==
Between 1838 and 1841 O'Hagan was the editor of The Newry Examiner. In 1840 he moved to Dublin, where he appeared for the repeal party in many political trials, becoming an Irish Queen's Counsel in 1849. His advocacy of a continuance of the Union with Great Britain, and his appointment as Solicitor-General for Ireland in 1860 and Attorney-General for Ireland in the following year, lost him the support of the Nationalist party, but he was returned to Parliament as Liberal Member of Parliament for Tralee in 1863. In 1865 he was appointed a judge of the Court of Common Pleas (Ireland), and in 1868 became Lord Chancellor of Ireland in William Ewart Gladstone's first administration.

O'Hagan was the first Roman Catholic to hold the chancellorship since the reign of James II, an Act of Parliament admitting Roman Catholics to the position having been passed in 1867. In 1870 he was created Baron O'Hagan, of Tullahogue in the County of Tyrone, and held office until the resignation of the ministry in 1874. In 1880 he again became Lord Chancellor on Gladstone's return to office, but resigned in 1881.

His tenure as Lord Chancellor saw several major legislative reforms in Ireland, of which the most notable was the Landlord and Tenant (Ireland) Act 1870, providing compensation for tenants in the event of eviction. His first term as Chancellor was also notable for his continual clashes with the other judge of appeal, Jonathan Christian, a bitter-tongued man with a deep contempt for most of his judicial colleagues, including O'Hagan, who he regarded as lazy and unqualified. Christian even published a letter in The Times attacking O'Hagan and his highly regarded Scottish colleague Lord Blackburn, who had voted to reverse one of his judgments. O'Hagan for his part seems to have regarded Christian as little more than a nuisance, but on taking up office for his second term, he did not hide his relief that Christian had retired.

On his retirement from office Lord O'Hagan was in 1882 appointed a Knight of St Patrick, having become Vice Chancellor of the Royal University of Ireland the previous year. He was president of the Statistical and Social Inquiry Society of Ireland between 1867 and 1870.

== Personal life ==
Lord O'Hagan married firstly in 1836 Mary Teeling, daughter of Charles Hamilton Teeling of Belfast. They had a son Charles who died 1896 in Dublin, and two daughters, Frances and Madeline. Mary died in 1868.

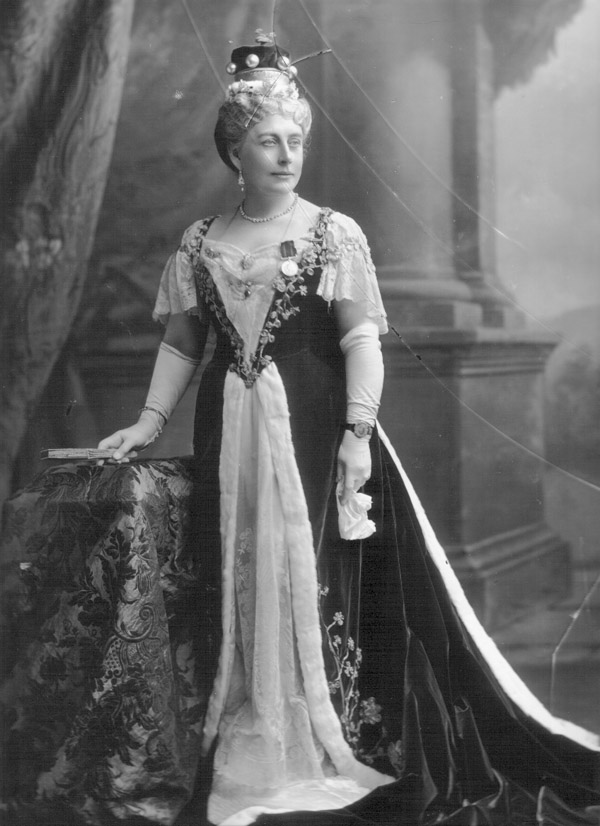
Lady O'Hagan, née Alice Mary Towneley, photographed 11 August 1902.

He married secondly in 1871 Alice Towneley, daughter and co-heiress of Colonel Charles Towneley of Towneley Park, Burnley, Lancashire, and Lady Caroline Molyneux, daughter of The 2nd Earl of Sefton. They had two sons, Thomas and Maurice, each of whom in turn inherited the title and changed the family name to Towneley-O'Hagan, and two daughters, Kathleen (who lived to be almost 100) and Mary, who married General Sir Charles Monro, 1st Baronet. Alice inherited the family home, Towneley Park, from her father, but found it too expensive to keep up and sold it to Burnley Corporation in 1901. She died on 20 November 1921.

After the death of John Towneley in 1878, O'Hagan inherited the Towneley family trustee position at the British Museum.

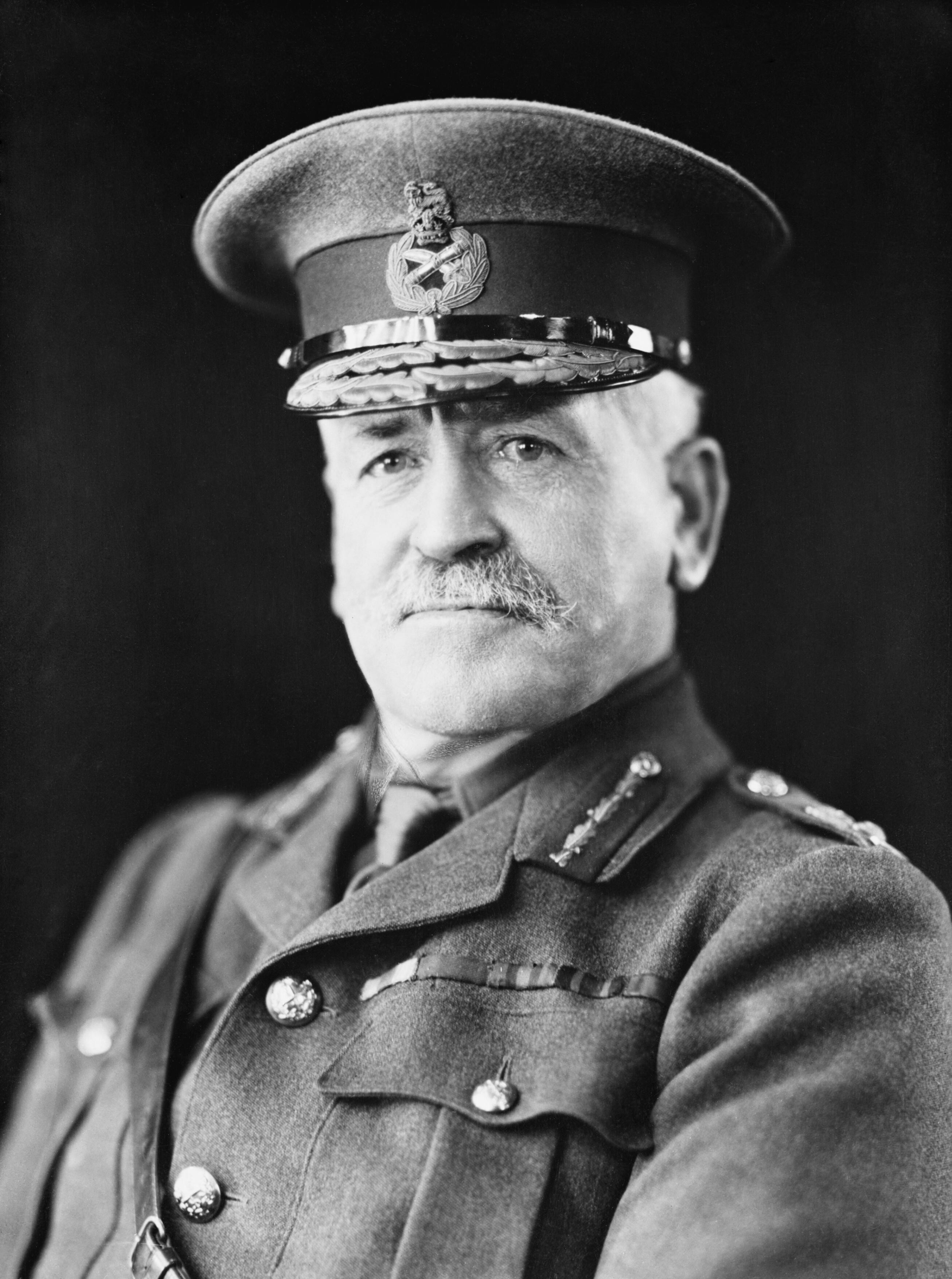
Sir Charles Monroe, 1st Baronet, who married Lord O'Hagan's daughter Mary

Lord O'Hagan died at Hereford House, London, in February 1885, aged 72, and was buried in Glasnevin Cemetery, Dublin. He was succeeded in the barony by his eldest son, Thomas (1878–1900), and then by another son, Maurice Herbert Towneley (born 1882).

The Liberal Unionist editor of the Belfast Northern Whig, Thomas Macknight, who had been a personal friend of O'Hagan, states in his memoir ULSTER AS IT IS (London, 1896) that he believed O'Hagan would have opposed William Ewart Gladstone's conversion to Irish Home Rule had he not died when he did.

O'Hagan's sister Mary was Abbess of the Poor Clare convent at Newry and later at Kenmare. Her biography was written by her protege MF Cusack (1839–1899), "the Nun of Kenmare".

Coat of arms of Thomas O'Hagan, 1st Baron O'Hagan
Crest 1st on a Roman fasces lying fesswise Proper a cubit arm vested Gules cuffed Ermine the hand holding a dagger erect both Proper (O'Hagan) 2nd on a perch Or a hawk close Proper beaked and belled Gold jessed Gules (Towneley). Escutcheon Quarterly 1st & 4th Ermine a bend Azure on a chief of the last a fleur-de-lys Or (O'Hagan) 2nd & 3rd Argent a fess Sable in chief three mullets of the second (Towneley). Supporters Two lions Or collared gemel Sable pendent therefrom an escutcheon Argent charged with a hand couped Gules. Motto Mihi Res Non Me Rebus.

Parliament of the United Kingdom
Preceded by Daniel O'Connell Jnr	Member of Parliament for Tralee; 1863–1865	Succeeded by Daniel O'Donoghue
Legal offices
Preceded by Rickard Deasy	Solicitor-General for Ireland; 1860–1861	Succeeded by James Anthony Lawson
Preceded by Rickard Deasy	Attorney-General for Ireland; 1861–1865	Succeeded by James Anthony Lawson
Political offices
Preceded by Abraham Brewster	Lord Chancellor of Ireland; 1868–1874	Succeeded by In commission – next held by John Thomas Ball
Preceded by John Thomas Ball	Lord Chancellor of Ireland; 1880–1881	Succeeded by Hugh Law
Peerage of the United Kingdom
New creation	Baron O'Hagan; 1870–1885	Succeeded by Thomas Towneley O'Hagan
