= Maurice Towneley-O'Hagan, 3rd Baron O'Hagan =

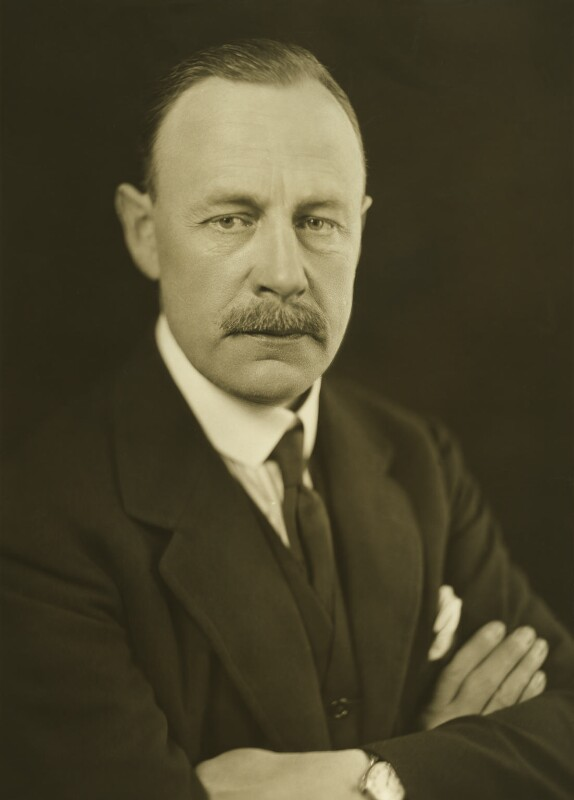
Lord Hagan

Maurice Herbert Towneley Towneley-O'Hagan, 3rd Baron O'Hagan (20 February 1882 – 18 December 1961), was a British Liberal and later Conservative politician.

O'Hagan was the second son of Thomas O'Hagan, 1st Baron O'Hagan, the Liberal Lord Chancellor of Ireland in Gladstone's first two governments; and his second wife Alice Mary, daughter and co-heiress of Colonel Charles Towneley; and he succeeded in the barony on the death of his elder brother in 1900, when he was still eighteen. He was educated at Marlborough College and Trinity College, Cambridge.

He was Assistant Private Secretary to the First Lord of the Admiralty Lord Tweedmouth from 1906 to 1907 and served in the Liberal administrations of Sir Henry Campbell-Bannerman and later H. H. Asquith as a Lord-in-waiting (government whip in the House of Lords) from 1907 to 1910.

During World War I he had been a Major in the Essex Royal Horse Artillery, for which he raised a regiment in 1914. He was invalided out of the army in 1918. On 28 May 1918, he was appointed a deputy lieutenant of Essex.

He continued to support the Liberals through the years of the Lloyd George government, but switched to supporting the Conservatives under Stanley Baldwin in the mid-1920s. He never again held government office. Many years later, between 1950 and 1961, O'Hagan was a Deputy Speaker and Deputy Chairman of the House of Lords. He remained an Honorary Major in the Royal Horse Artillery (TA) and an Honorary Colonel in the 4th (Cadet) Battalion of the Essex Regiment and in the 6th Battalion of the Essex Regiment (TA). In 1909, he assumed by Royal licence his maternal grandfather's surname of Towneley in addition to that of O'Hagan.

Lord O'Hagan married firstly the Hon. Frances Constance Maddalena, daughter of Edward Strachey, 1st Baron Strachie, in 1911. She died in 1931. He married secondly Evelyn Violet, daughter of Harry Thornton Ross and widow of Henry Osbet Samuel Cadogan, in 1937. O'Hagan died in December 1961, aged 79, and was succeeded in the barony by his grandson Charles. Lady O'Hagan died in 1965.

Coat of arms of Maurice Towneley-O'Hagan, 3rd Baron O'Hagan
Crest 1st on a Roman fasces lying fesswise Proper a cubit arm vested Gules cuffed Ermine the hand holding a dagger erect both Proper (O’Hagan) 2nd on a perch Or a hawk close Proper beaked and belled Gold jessed Gules (Towneley). Escutcheon Quarterly 1st & 4th Ermine a bend Azure on a chief of the last a fleur-de-lys Or (O’Hagan) 2nd & 3rd Argent a fess Sable in chief three mullets of the second (Towneley). Supporters Two lions Or collared gemel Sable pendent therefrom an escutcheon Argent charged with a hand couped Gules. Motto Mihi Res Non Me Rebus.

== Notes ==
Peerage of the United Kingdom
Preceded by Thomas Towneley O'Hagan	Baron O'Hagan; 1900–1961	Succeeded by Charles Towneley Strachey
