= Baron O'Hagan =

Barony in the Peerage of the United Kingdom

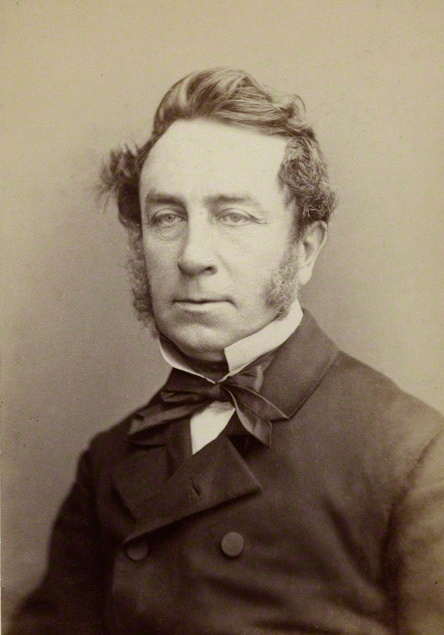
Thomas O'Hagan, 1st Baron O'Hagan

Baron O'Hagan, of Tullahogue in the County of Tyrone, is a title in the Peerage of the United Kingdom. It was created on 14 June 1870 for Sir Thomas O'Hagan, then Lord Chancellor of Ireland. His younger son, the third Baron, served as a Lord-in-waiting (government whip in the House of Lords) from 1907 to 1910 in the Liberal administrations of Sir Henry Campbell-Bannerman and H. H. Asquith and was later a Deputy Speaker of the House of Lords. In 1909 Lord O'Hagan assumed by Royal licence the additional surname of Towneley, which was that of his maternal grandfather. As of 2025 the title is held by his grandson, the fifth Baron, who succeeded in 2025. He is the son of the Hon. Thomas Anthony Edward Towneley Strachey (d. 1955). His elder brother Lord O'Hagan was a Member of the European Parliament for Devon from 1973 to 1975 and again from 1979 to 1994, first as an independent and later as a Conservative. He assumed in 1938 by deed poll the additional Christian name of Towneley and the surname of Strachey in lieu of his patronymic. Strachey was the surname of his maternal grandfather Edward Strachey, 1st Baron Strachie.

== Barons O'Hagan (1870) ==
- Thomas O'Hagan, 1st Baron O'Hagan (1812–1885)
- Thomas Towneley O'Hagan, 2nd Baron O'Hagan (1878–1900)
- Maurice Herbert Towneley Towneley-O'Hagan, 3rd Baron O'Hagan (1882–1961)
- Charles Towneley Strachey, 4th Baron O'Hagan (1945–2025)
- Richard Towneley Strachey, 5th Baron O'Hagan (b. 1950)

The 5th Baron's heir apparent is his son Hon. Columba O’Hagan Strachey (b. 1985)

Coat of arms of Baron O'Hagan
Crest 1st on a Roman fasces lying fesswise Proper a cubit arm vested Gules cuffed Ermine the hand holding a dagger erect both Proper (O’Hagan) 2nd on a perch Or a hawk close Proper beaked and belled Gold jessed Gules (Towneley). Escutcheon Quarterly 1st & 4th Ermine a bend Azure on a chief of the last a fleur-de-lys Or (O’Hagan) 2nd & 3rd Argent a fess Sable in chief three mullets of the second (Towneley). Supporters Two lions Or collared gemel Sable pendent therefrom an escutcheon Argent charged with a hand couped Gules. Motto Mihi Res Non Me Rebus.
