= Whalley Abbey vestments =

Medieval ecclesiastical vestments

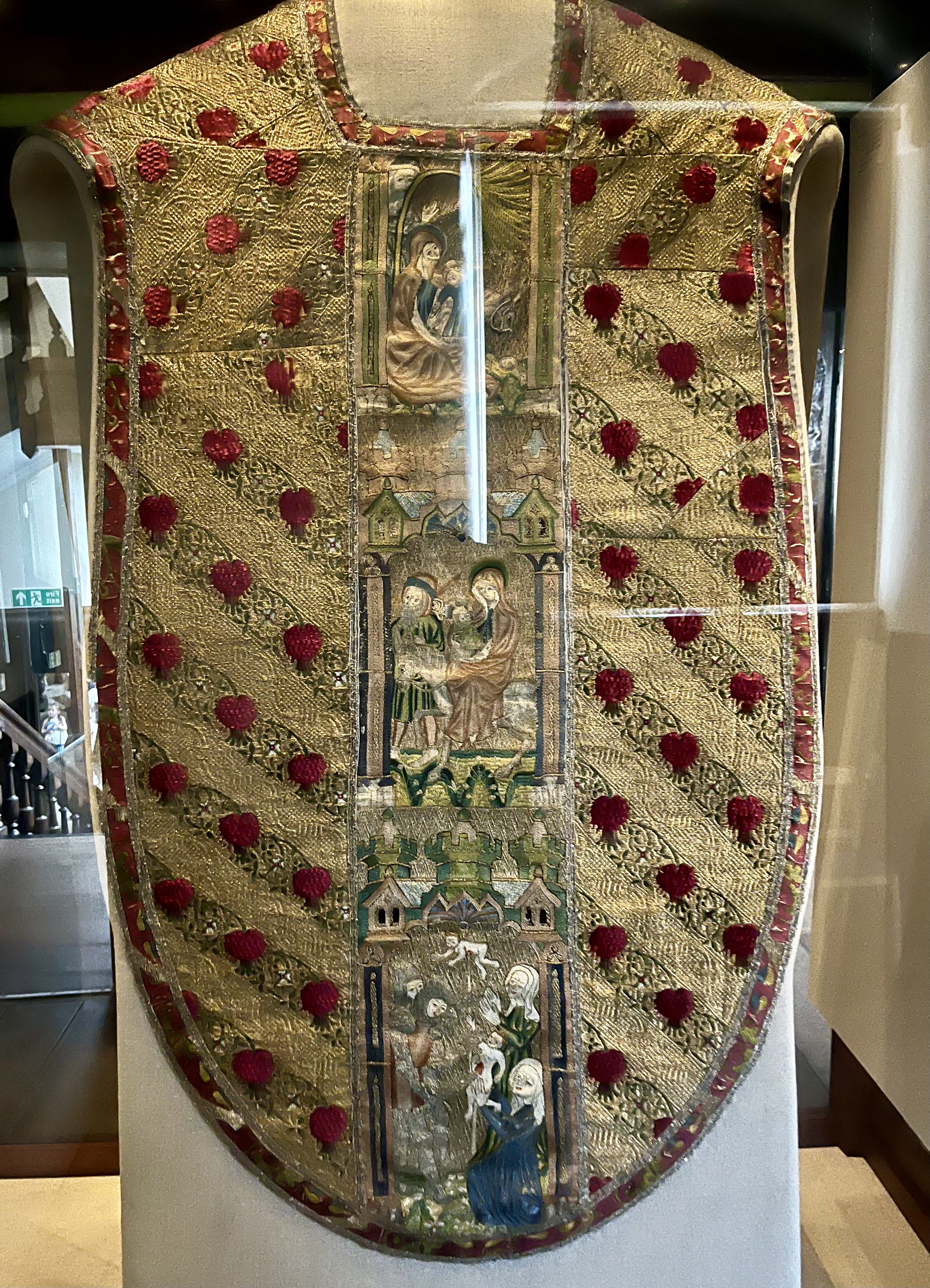
The chasuble

The Whalley Abbey vestments are a set of early fifteenth century ecclesiastical vestments, consisting of a chasuble, two dalmatics, and a maniple which may have been made up later. They were used at Whalley Abbey in Lancashire, England until the monastery was dissolved in 1536–37, and are notable for being one of two complete sets of English high mass vestments thought to survive from before the English Reformation. The Whalley abbey altar frontal is associated with the vestments but does not form part of the same set. It was created, probably in the early nineteenth century, by applying medieval embroideries to a later piece of fabric.

One of the dalmatics now belongs to the Burrell Collection in Glasgow, Scotland, and the other three vestments and the altar frontal to Burnley Borough Council, which displays them at Towneley Hall in Burnley, England.

== History ==
The vestments were made for Whalley Abbey, a Cistercian monastery founded in 1296 on the River Calder in Lancashire. The Burrell Collection gives the date of the cloth of gold used in the vestments as c. 1415, of the velvet as c. 1420, and the orphreys (embroidered bands) as c. 1415–1435. According to Lisa Monnas, the set is thought to be one two complete surviving sets of pre-Reformation English high mass vestments.

Whalley Abbey was dissolved in 1536–37, and a survey taken at that time mentions "one vestment of red clothe of gold with an image on a crosse on the bak with tynnacles for a deacon and sub-deacon belonging to the same." They were saved by Sir John Towneley, the owner of the nearby Towneley Hall and a Roman Catholic recusant, and were occasionally used by the Towneley family over the following four centuries. The maniple is not an original part of the set, according to Carol Richardson, but was instead created in the seventeenth century from leftover fabric resulting from the alteration of the chasuble. The vestments were sold by auction in either 1922 or 1939; one dalmatic was purchased on behalf of William Burrell for the Burrel Collection in Glasgow, and the other three vestments were purchased by the Corporation of Burnley and displayed in Towneley Hall.

The altar frontal was assembled, possibly in the early nineteenth century, by attaching three medieval orphreys to a background of crimson silk probably produced in the late eighteenth or early nineteenth century. The central orphey dates from the turn of the sixteenth century, and the pillar orpheys to either side may date from the late fourteenth to early fifteenth century. There is little variation in the execution of the two lowest panels of each pillar orphey; the saints are depicted in near-identical stances and were probably executed using the same stencil, and the same colours of silk are used for their clothing. This is evidence that embroidery manufacture during the period in which the panels were produced valued speed over fine workmanship. All three orphreys have been edged with silver bobbin lace typical of the seventeenth century. There is no direct link between the orphreys on the frontal and those on the vestments and they are very different in style and quality; those on the frontal may have belonged to Whalley, but this is not certain.

== Description ==
=== Vestments ===
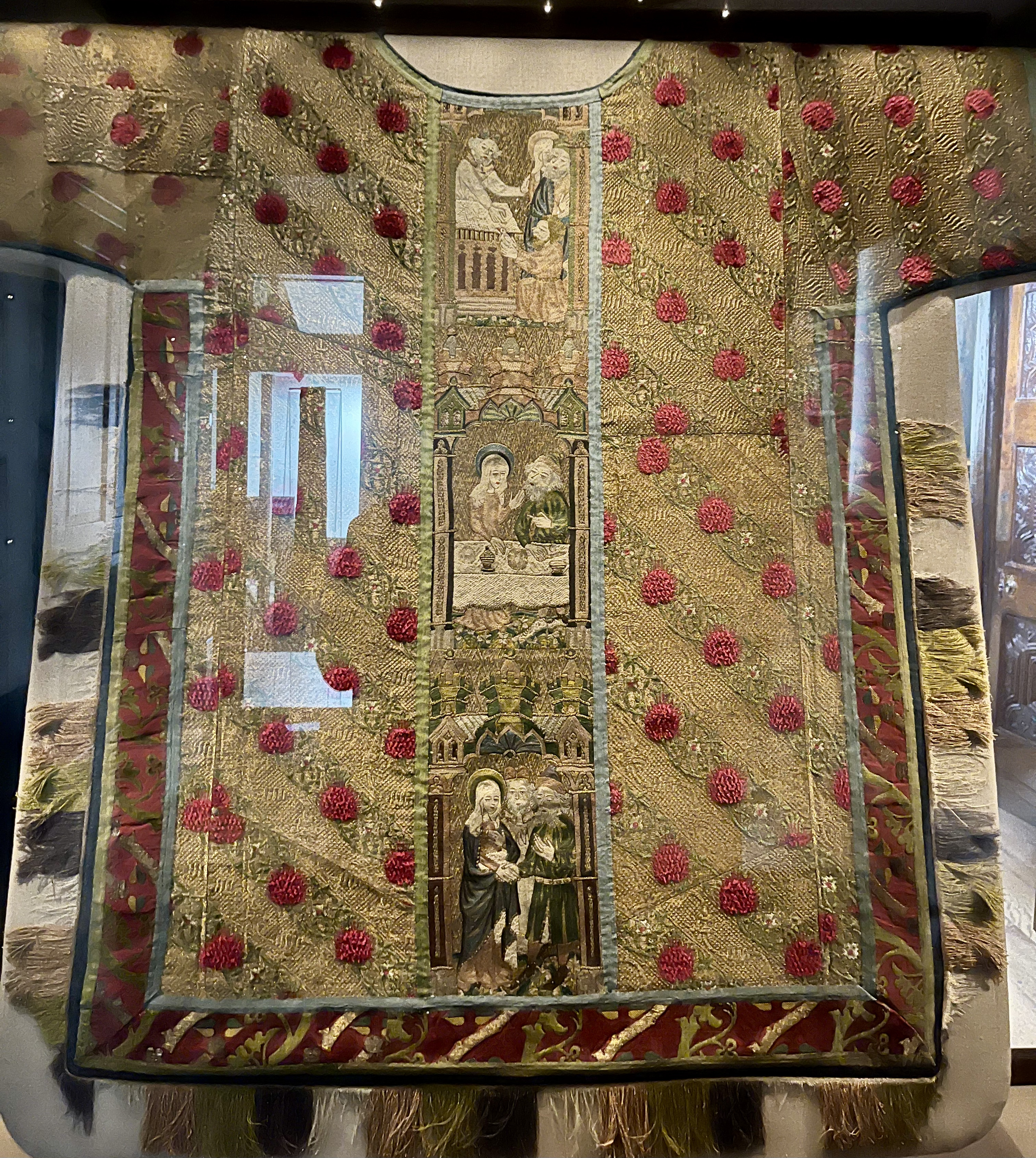
The dalmatic at Towneley Hall

The vestments are made from Italian brocaded silk velvet cloth of gold which is decorated with diagonal bands consisting of a design in velvet and gold thread of knotted crowns and thorns alternating with a multi-coloured silk design of pomegranates, white flowers, and leaves on a tabby silk ground. The chasuble and dalmatics are additionally decorated with orphreys, or embroidered bands, in a style known as Opus Anglicanum or "English work". They depict scenes from the life of Mary, mother of Jesus and from the infancy of Jesus enclosed by architectural canopies and are executed in coloured silk and silver gilt thread. The dalmatics are hemmed and their outer seams covered by plain weave silk in dark blue and green, and the edges of the sleeves and sides and bottom of the body have a border of red silk velvet decorated with motifs in multi-coloured silk, gold thread, and silver thread, the inner seam of which is covered by light blue silk ribbon. Each also has multi-coloured silk fringe. The backing is blue linen.

=== Altar frontal ===
The central orphey on the frontal takes the form of a Latin cross containing a depiction of the crucifixion. The pillar orpheys to either side are each divided into three panels; each panel contains a pair of saints, one male and one female, beneath architectural canopies. All three are mounted on crimson silk.

== Sources ==
- "Whalley dalmatic". Glasgow Museums Collections Navigator. Archived from the original on 29 September 2022.
- "Whalley Abbey Vestments". Lancashire Textile Gallery. 2023-07-05. Archived from the original on 8 August 2024.
- Richardson, Carol M. (2023). "Feeble References: Catholic Material Culture". In Chambers, Liam (ed.). The Oxford History of British and Irish Catholicism, Volume III: Relief, Revolution, and Revival, 1746-1829. Oxford: Oxford University Press. p. 319. ISBN 9780198843443.
- Monnas, Lisa (1994). "Opus Anglicanum and Renaissance Velvet: the Whalley Abbey Vestments". Textile History. 25 (1): 3–27 – via Taylor and Francis.
- Tonkin, Leanne C. (2010). "Comparative Approaches in Textile Conservation: the Whalley Abbey Vestments and Altar Frontal" (PDF). Postprints of the Textile Specialty Group. 22. Archived from the original (PDF) on 4 September 2025.
- Tonkin, Leanne C. (May 2012). "Insights into the Production of Opus Anglicanum: An Object Analysis of Two Panels from the Pillar Orphreys on the Whalley Abbey Altar Frontal". Textile History. 43 (1): 83–89 – via Academia.edu.
