= Church of St Mary and All Saints, Whalley =

Coordinates: 53.8212°N 2.4077°W

St Mary and All Saints, Whalley
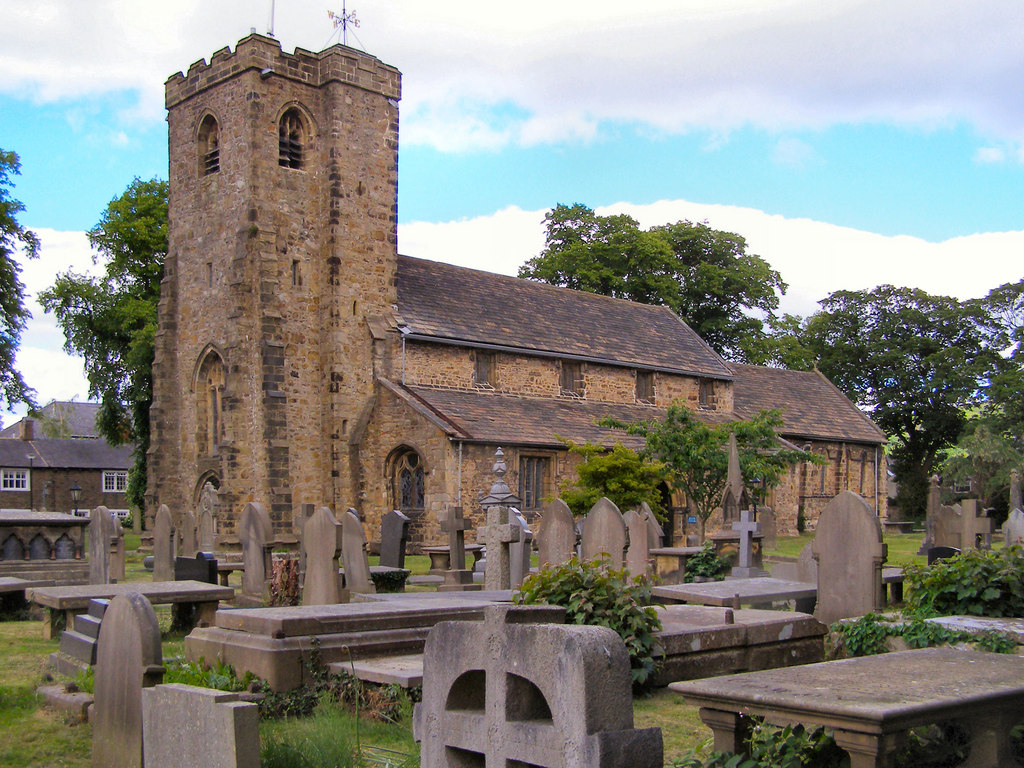
- From the south west

- Location in the Borough of Ribble Valley
- OS grid reference: SD 73254 36180
- Location: Whalley, Lancashire
- Country: England
- Denomination: Anglican
- Website: www.whalleypc.org.uk

Architecture
- Functional status: Active
- Heritage designation: Grade I
- Designated: 13 February 1967

Administration
- Province: York
- Diocese: Blackburn
- Archdeaconry: Blackburn
- Deanery: Whalley

Clergy
- Vicar: Revd Jonathan Carmyllie

The Church of St Mary and All Saints is an Anglican church in the village of Whalley, Lancashire, England. It is an active parish church in the Diocese of Blackburn. A church probably existed on the site in Anglo-Saxon times and the current building dates from the 13th century. It is recorded in the National Heritage List for England as a designated Grade I listed building.

== History ==
A church probably existed on this site in Anglo-Saxon times; there are three well-preserved Anglo-Saxon crosses in the churchyard, as well as fragments from that time in the exterior walls of the current building. The crosses are protected as Scheduled Monuments. The "Church of St Mary held in Wallei" was mentioned in the Domesday Book of 1086. Its endowment of “two carucates of land free of all custom” suggests that the church was among the wealthiest in what would become Lancashire. Most of the present church was built in the 13th century, replacing a simpler structure which likely had an aisleless nave and chancel. The tower was added in the late 15th century. A porch was added to the south of the building in 1844, and one to the north in 1909. Restorations took place in 1866 and 1868.

== Architecture ==
=== Exterior ===
The church is built of sandstone rubble with a slate roof. It has a clerestoried nave with north and south aisles, a chancel with vestry, porches and a tower. The large east window is in the perpendicular style and has five cinquefoil lights. The four clerestory windows on either side each have two cinquefoil lights. The north and south aisles both have square-headed windows, five on the south side and three on the north. There are two modern dormer windows in the roof of the north aisle.

The tower is in the perpendicular style and Claire Hartwell and Pevsner, in the Buildings of England, note similarities to many North Lancashire church towers. It is 70 feet (21 m) high with buttresses and a crenellated parapet. The belfry louvres each have two trefoiled lights with tracery. There is a clock on the east wall of the tower.

=== Interior and fittings ===
The south porch was added in 1844 but the doorway into the church contains parts of the pillars from the Norman church of the 11th century. The octagonal font of yellow gritstone dates from the 15th century while the oak cover 17th century. The nave measures 72 feet (22 m) by 24 feet (7.3 m) and has four bays. It is in the Early English style. The north arcade has round piers while those in the south arcade are octagonal; all have moulded caps and bases. The arcade arches are pointed and double-chamfered.

Of particular interest inside the church is the furniture. Simon Jenkins, in his England's Thousand Best Churches, suggests that ".. the church could qualify as a museum of ecclesiastical seating". On the north aisle is a churchwarden's pew, which seats eight, dating from 1690, then a constables' pew, benches dated 1638, a rectory pew of 1702 and then St. Anton's Cage (see below).

At the east end of the north aisle there is a chantry chapel dedicated to St Nicholas, also known as the Soldiers' Chapel. It contains evidence of a stair to a rood loft, the likely remnants of a piscina and a Medieval altar stone. The chapel is surrounded by a 15th-century screen. A chantry chapel at the east end of the south aisle is dedicated to St Mary. It too is surrounded by a 15th-century screen and contains a piscina probably from the 14th century, with an ogee-shaped head. The chapel contains square, wooden pews. The north aisle's north door is oak with glass bullseyes and is enclosed by a wooden porch. The chancel measures 51 feet 6 inches (15.70 m) by 24 feet 6 inches (7.47 m). The stalls were carved in about 1430 and came from the church at Whalley Abbey. Rare amongst medieval works, the name of the craftsman, a Mr Eatough, has survived.

The misericord carvings present a varied range of subjects: religious imagery dominates, with angels, devils, the Holy Trinity, two eagles carrying Alexander to Heaven, and St George and the dragon; there are mystical scenes such as a girl with a weeping satyr and griffins; but there are also images of plants, fruit and scenes of everyday life - a blacksmith shoeing, a goose, vines and pomegranates, and a wife beating her husband with a pan. Jenkins comments: "The misericords are beautifully executed and deserve nationwide repute."

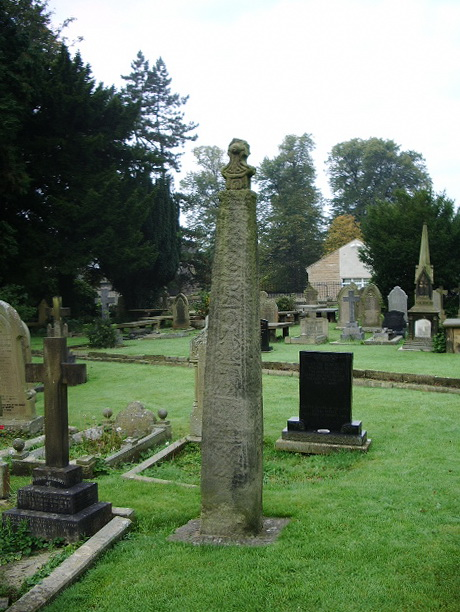
One of three Anglo-Saxon crosses in the churchyard

St. Anton's Cage, a large pew next to the Lady Chapel, was originally for the Nowell family of Read, near Padiham. Made in 1534 it was extended twice in the 17th century. Above the doors are the initials of the Fort and Taylor families who vied for possession of the pew in the early 19th century. A date, 1830, references the division of the pew by order of an ecclesiastical court, in order to resolve the dispute. But the compromise suited neither family and the pew was abandoned, each family building private galleries elsewhere in the nave. These have now disappeared. An oak box within the pew contains a 1684 edition of Foxe's Book of Martyrs and an early edition of Whittaker's History of Whalley.

The organ, dating from 1727, was originally built for Lancaster Priory. It was purchased in 1813 at a cost of three hundred guineas (equivalent to £20,000 as of 2025).

=== Churchyard ===
The churchyard has three stone Anglo-Saxon crosses, probably dating from the 10th or 11th century. There is a sundial east of the church which is listed at Grade II. It dates from 1757.

== Governance ==
In September 2015 Revd Jonathan Carmyllie was appointed the Vicar of West Pendleside parishes. Currently serving in the Diocese of Manchester, Revd Carmyllie was Instituted and Inducted at St Nicholas' church, Sabden on 30 September 2015.

== See also ==
- Grade I listed churches in Lancashire
- Grade I listed buildings in Lancashire
- Scheduled monuments in Lancashire
- Listed buildings in Whalley, Lancashire
