= Marion Donaldson =

Scottish fashion designer (born 1944)

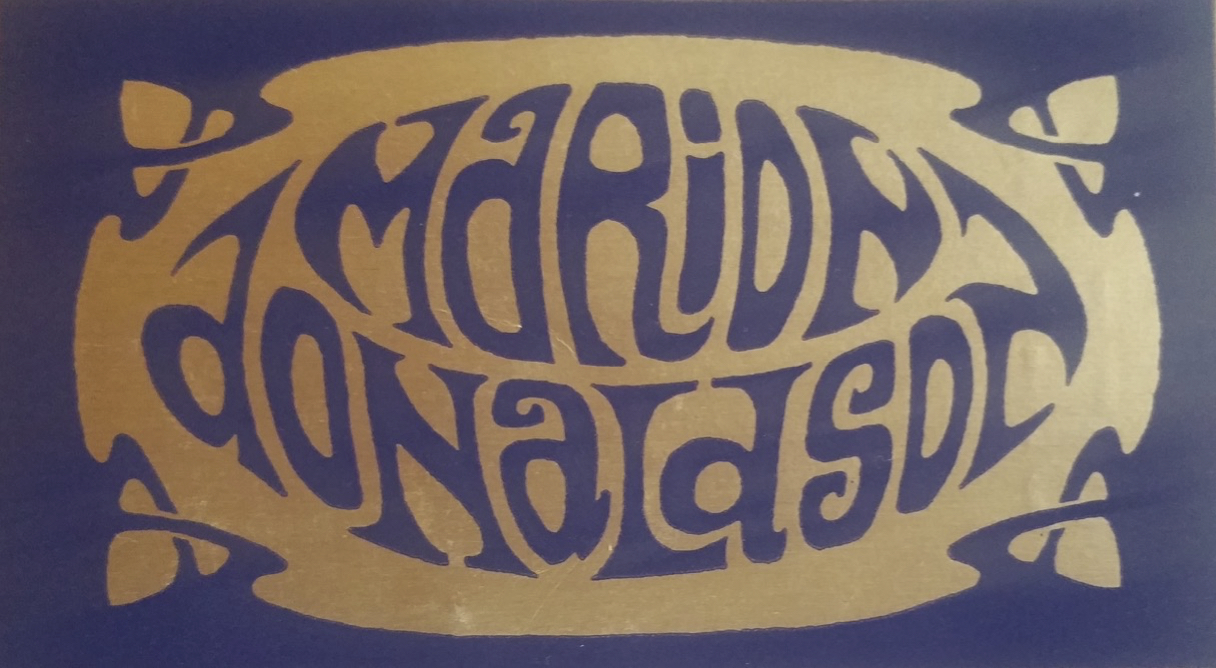
- Marion Donaldson company logo
- Born: 1944 (age 81–82); Glasgow, Scotland
- Occupation: Fashion designer
- Years active: 1966–1999
- Spouse: David Donaldson

Marion Donaldson (born 1944) is a Scottish fashion designer. She, with her husband David Donaldson, ran the Glasgow-based fashion design and manufacturing company of the same name from 1966 until their retirement in 1999.

== History ==
Marion Donaldson was born in Glasgow in 1944. She and David Donaldson met as students in Glasgow and married in December 1965. After a period in London, where David worked at the Liberty store, the couple returned to Glasgow in 1966 and began producing clothing from their kitchen table. The company was founded with £50 of starting capital.

The label's first stockist was In Gear on Gibson Street, described as Glasgow's first fashion boutique. Other early stockists included Aquarius on Byres Road in Glasgow, Togs for Togs in Edinburgh, and Fenwick of Bond Street in London. Within a year, the business had accounts with stores in Edinburgh, Glasgow, Manchester and London's West End. At its peak the company produced around 1,000 garments a week. Turnover exceeded £300,000 by 1970 and passed £1 million by 1979.

== Collections, exhibitions and scholarship ==
Donaldson's garments are held in public museum collections, including Aberdeen Art Gallery and Museums, which holds at least four pieces dating from the 1960s and 1970s. When the Riverside Museum opened in Glasgow, curators created a simulated 1960s boutique displaying Marion Donaldson garments as part of a recreated period street. Marion Donaldson garments were also included in the 2018 exhibition Liberty Art Fabrics and Fashion at Dovecot Studios in Edinburgh.

The company has been the subject of academic research by the historian Jade Halbert, whose 2018 University of Glasgow PhD thesis took the company as its main case study of the post-war British fashion industry. Halbert has subsequently published several peer-reviewed articles drawing on the Marion Donaldson archive, including a 2019 article in Textile History examining the company's encounters with "cabbage", the informal trade in surplus cloth, as a lens on the hidden economy of the British rag trade in the 1970s, and a 2022 article in Costume on the Scottish boutique scene of the late 1960s.
