= Whalley, Lancashire =

Village in Lancashire, England

Coordinates: 53.824°N 2.404°W

Whalley
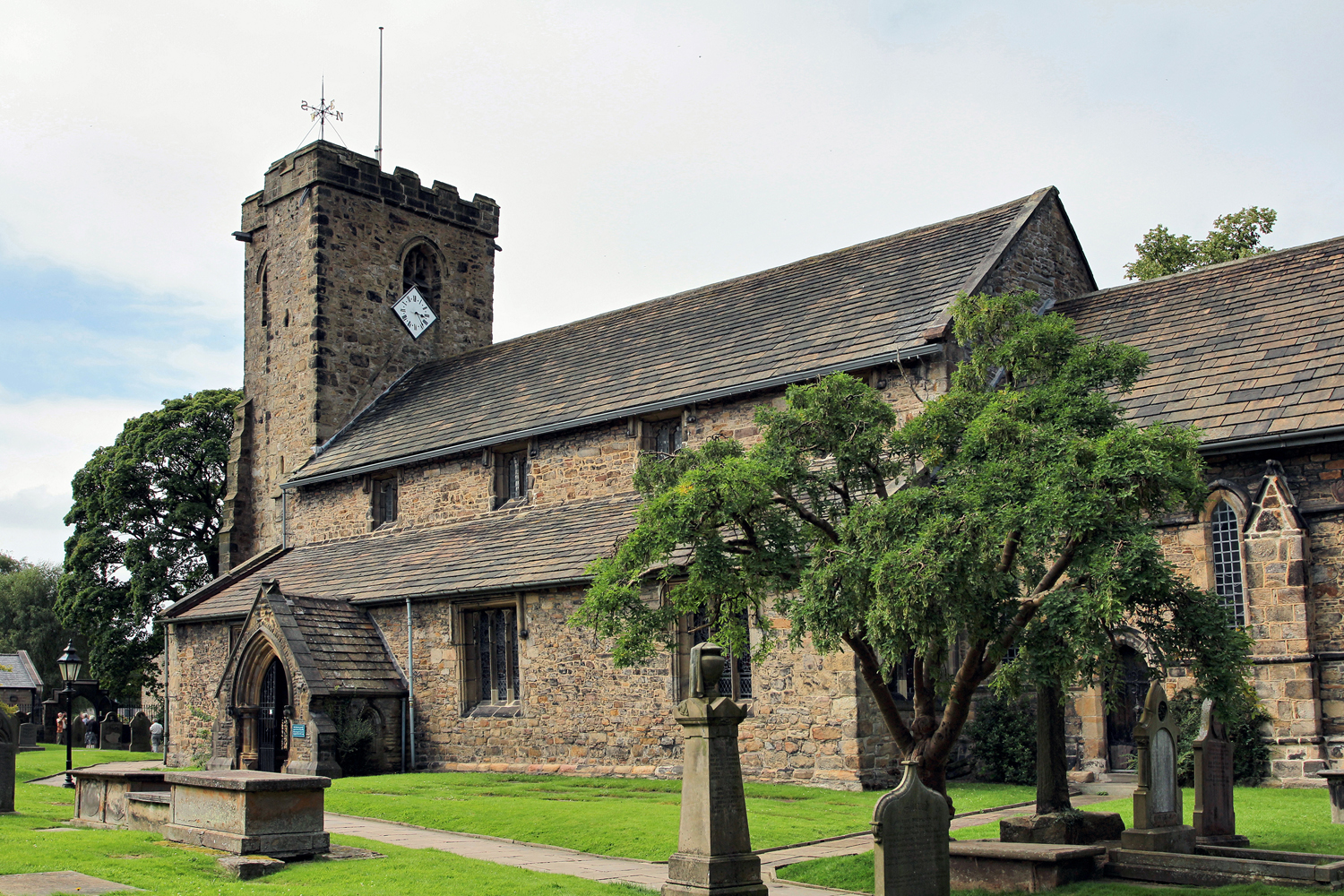
- St. Mary and All Saints Church

- Shown within Ribble Valley Location within Lancashire
- Population: 3,629 (Parish 2011)
- OS grid reference: SD735365
- Civil parish: Whalley
- District: Ribble Valley
- Shire county: Lancashire
- Region: North West
- Country: England
- Sovereign state: United Kingdom
- Post town: CLITHEROE
- Postcode district: BB7
- Dialling code: 01254
- Police: Lancashire
- Fire: Lancashire
- Ambulance: North West
- UK Parliament: Ribble Valley

Whalley /ˈhwɔːli/ is a village and civil parish in the Ribble Valley on the banks of the River Calder in Lancashire, England. It is overlooked by Whalley Nab, a large wooded hill over the river from the village. The population of the civil parish was 2,645 at the census of 2001, and increased to 3,629 at the census of 2011.

The main road through Whalley is King Street, which leads through to Clitheroe Road. Neighbouring Whalley are the small villages of Wiswell, Billington, Barrow, and Read. Close by is Downham village and Pendle Hill which was made famous in William Harrison Ainsworth's book The Lancashire Witches.

== History ==
Portfield Hillfort also known as Planes Wood Camp, thought to date from late Bronze Age or Iron Age, is located on a slight promontory overlooking the valley of the River Calder southeast of the town. It is one of over 140 Scheduled monuments in Lancashire.

=== Flooding ===
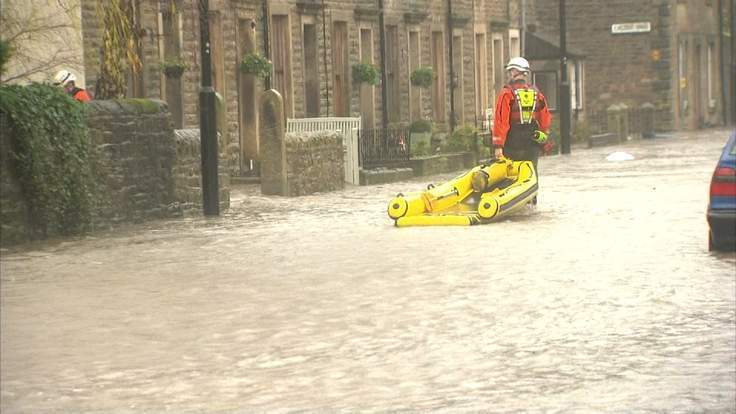
Flooding (December 2015)

Whalley was severely affected by flooding in December 2015. Hundreds of homes were damaged and many residents required rescue as flood water from the nearby River Calder engulfed their homes. The restoration of many homes damaged by the flood remains in progress.

In February 2020, Whalley was hit by flooding caused by Storm Ciara.

== Landmarks ==
=== Whalley Viaduct ===
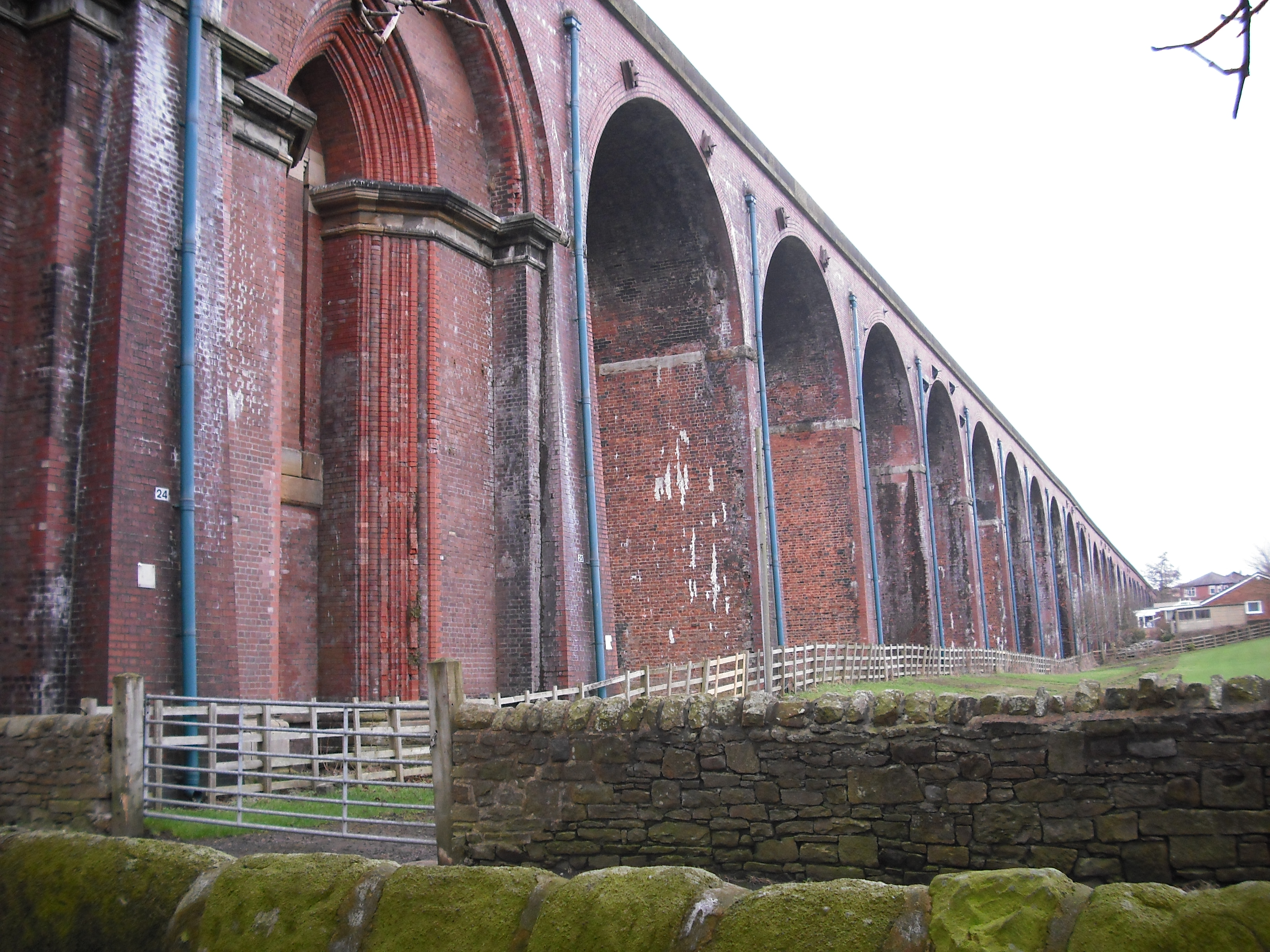
Whalley Arches, east side, from the road

Known locally as "Whalley Arches", Whalley Viaduct is a 48-span railway bridge crossing the River Calder. It is a Grade II listed building. It was built between 1846 and 1850 under the engineering supervision of Terrence Wolfe Flanagan and formed part of the Bolton, Blackburn, Clitheroe and West Yorkshire Railway. It is a red brick arch structure and the longest and largest railway viaduct in Lancashire. It carries the railway, now known as the Ribble Valley Line, 21.3m over the river for 620m. Over seven million bricks and 12,338 cubic metres of stone were used in construction. 3,000m of timber were used for the arch centring, temporary platforms and the permanent foundation piles. During construction on 6 October 1849, two of the 41 arches then completed collapsed, with the loss of three lives. The east side of the bridge, nearest the remains of the Abbey, has the only decorative treatment.

=== Whalley Abbey ===
The village has the ruins of Whalley Abbey, a 14th-century Cistercian abbey. The monks of Whalley described the site of their abbey beneath Whalley Nab, on the banks of the Calder, as locus benedictus - a blessed place.

=== Other places of interest ===
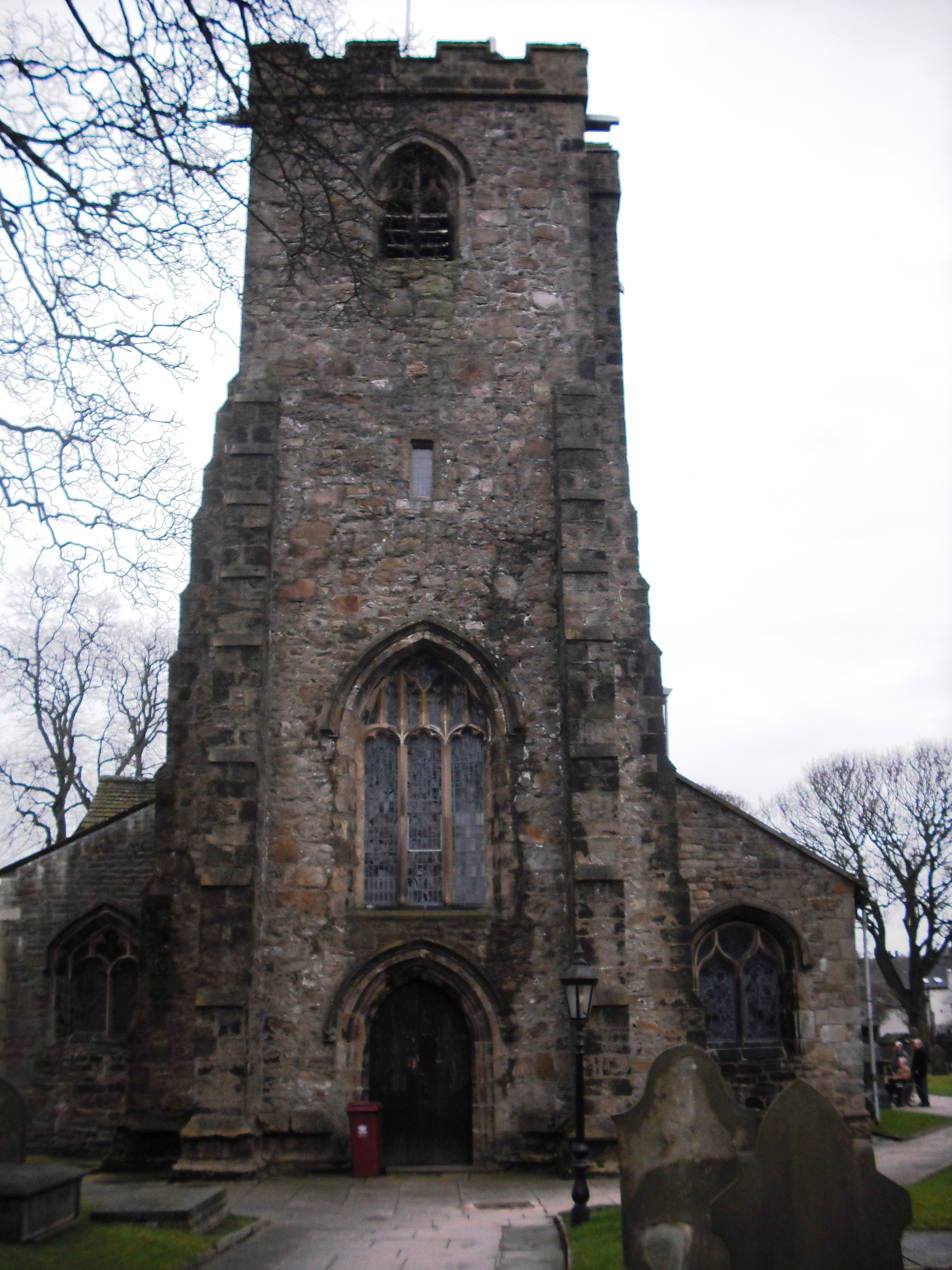
St Mary and All Saints parish church tower

The parish church of St Mary and All Saints dates to 628 in the period when St. Paulinus was said to have preached at Whalley. The church has a large number of notable misericords, eighteen 15th century and four Victorian, the former known to have originated at Whalley Abbey. It is a Grade I listed building. The church-yard has three Anglo-Saxon crosses, which are listed scheduled monuments. It also contains war graves of 8 servicemen of World War I and 5 of World War II. A Roman Catholic church, The English Martyrs, lies near the Abbey. The village has a total of 23 listed buildings at Grade I, II* and II.

=== Calder's waterfall and isles ===
The River Calder has a man made weir section at Whalley, which supposedly allowed the monks of Whalley Abbey to collect water easily. It has been suggested that was one of the main reasons for the abbey being built where it was. The river here has two small islands made of pebbles and rocks.

The dam/weir was built to guide water to a channel, that fed a water wheel in the Corn Mill, (there is a sluice gate where the dam meets the channel, this turns the wheel on and off) this gave power to grind the various products (Wheat, Barley etc.). The power to the Mill was all belt driven through a pulley system. The mill has now been transformed into flats, but you can still see the remains of the wheel through an opening at the back of the building.

In 2015 a 100 kW hydro installation and fish pass was completed at Whalley Weir on the River Calder in Whalley. The micro hydroelectric generating plant uses a variable speed Archimedean screw.

== Shops and amenities ==
Whalley has many independent shops, hairdressers, numerous take aways and estate agents, a SPAR and a new Coop in the former Whalley Arms pub, a pharmacy and wine shop. The centre of the town is dominated by three pubs, The Dog, The Swan Hotel (established in 1780) and The DeLacy Arms. There is also a small night club named Rendezvous (Rio's) and a public library, doctors' surgery and an adult learning centre.

Whalley is home to the Calderstones Partnership NHS Mental Health Trust. The hospital was founded in 1915 as "Queen Mary's Military Hospital". It then became "Whalley Asylum" and eventually, from 1929 to 1993, "Calderstones Hospital" and is now known as "Mersey Care"

The hospital has a burial ground, at the end of which is the Whalley (Queen Mary's Hospital) Cemetery, containing 42 graves of Commonwealth service personnel (primarily military patients), 33 from World War I and nine from World War II, together with a memorial to nearly 300 servicemen who died in the hospital. The cemetery is accessible via the more recently established Ribble Valley Remembrance Park.

Oakhill School is a private Roman Catholic school located in the village.

== Transport ==
There are hourly trains from Whalley railway station to Blackburn and Manchester Victoria running over the imposing Whalley Viaduct. These are operated by Northern. There are also bus services to Accrington, Blackburn, Burnley, Clitheroe, Longridge, Skipton from the village's central street and Whalley Bus Station.

Bus services are operated by Blackburn Bus Company, Burnley Bus Company & Vision Bus. The small bus station consists of three stands for buses heading south. Buses heading north, towards Clitheroe and beyond, use the bus stop located almost opposite, on King Street, the main street running through the village.

== Sport ==
A local club staged speedway meetings at Dean's Pleasure Grounds in the end of the 1920s. The track was very small and only two riders were allowed to race at any one time. A contemporary photo shows the track on flat land adjacent to a river and the showground with a helter skelter. Today there are sports facilities including tennis courts, football pitches, a bowling green and cricket ground. In 1867, Whalley hosted the first Roses Match between Lancashire County Cricket Club and Yorkshire County Cricket Club at Station Road.

The second stage of the Tour of Britain Women's cycle race passed through Whalley in 2026.

== Culture ==
Whalley Pickwick Night (named after the Charles Dickens novel The Pickwick Papers) is an event in December of each year with people in Victorian costume to raise funds for charity. The first event was in the 1980s as a late night (6pm–9 pm) Christmas shopping event, and in more recent years has since expanded with stalls, indoor events and a religious service.

The town participates with the adjacent village of Billington in "Billington and Whalley Brass Band Club."

== Notable people ==
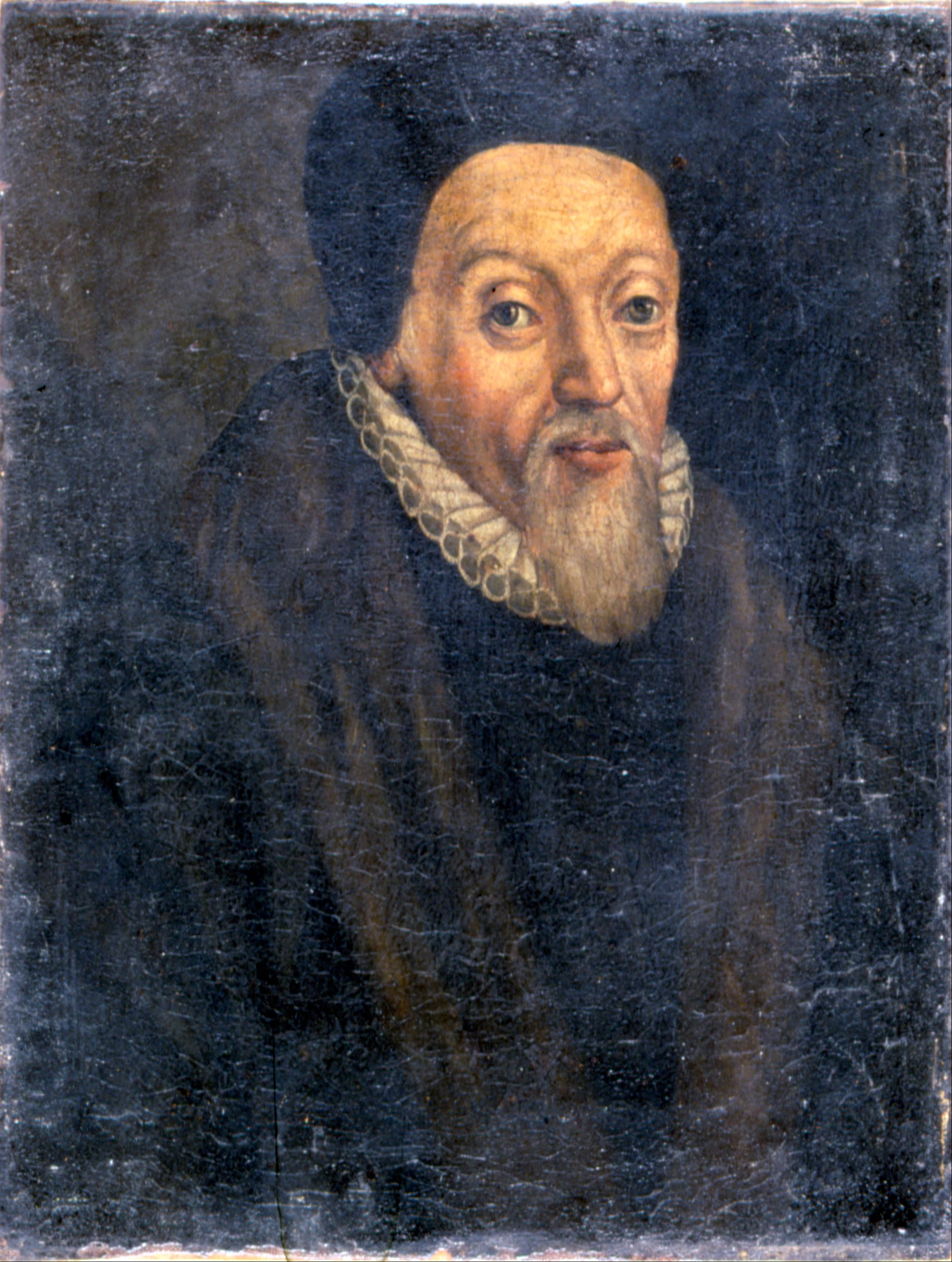
Alexander Nowell, ca.1620

- Alexander Nowell (c. 1517–1602), Anglican priest and theologian; served as Dean of St Paul's
- Laurence Nowell (1530–c. 1570) antiquarian, cartographer and scholar of Old English language and literature
- John Woolton (c. 1535–1594), Bishop of Exeter from 1579 to 1594; nephew in law of Alexander Nowell
- Peter Drinkwater (1750–1801), a cotton manufacturer and merchant
- Sir Hugh Fort (1862–1919), barrister-at-law who worked in the Straits Settlements
- Sir Cyril Norwood (1875–1956), educationalist, headmaster of Harrow School, and president of St John's College, Oxford
- Lieutenant General Sir Clarence August Bird (1885–1986), Army officer and colonial administrator, Chairman of Rhodesia Railways, who lived to the age of 101
- Steven Pinder (born 1960), actor, known for his roles in Crossroads (1985–1987) and Brookside (1990–2003)

=== Sport ===
- Bernard Reidy (born 1953), first-class cricketer, played 107 First-class cricket games
- Andy Payton (born 1967), footballer, who played 509 games, including for Hull City & Burnley
- Phil Eastwood (born 1978), footballer who played about 400 games, starting with Burnley
- Josh O'Keefe (born 1988), footballer who played about 300 games, most recently for Chorley

== Gallery ==
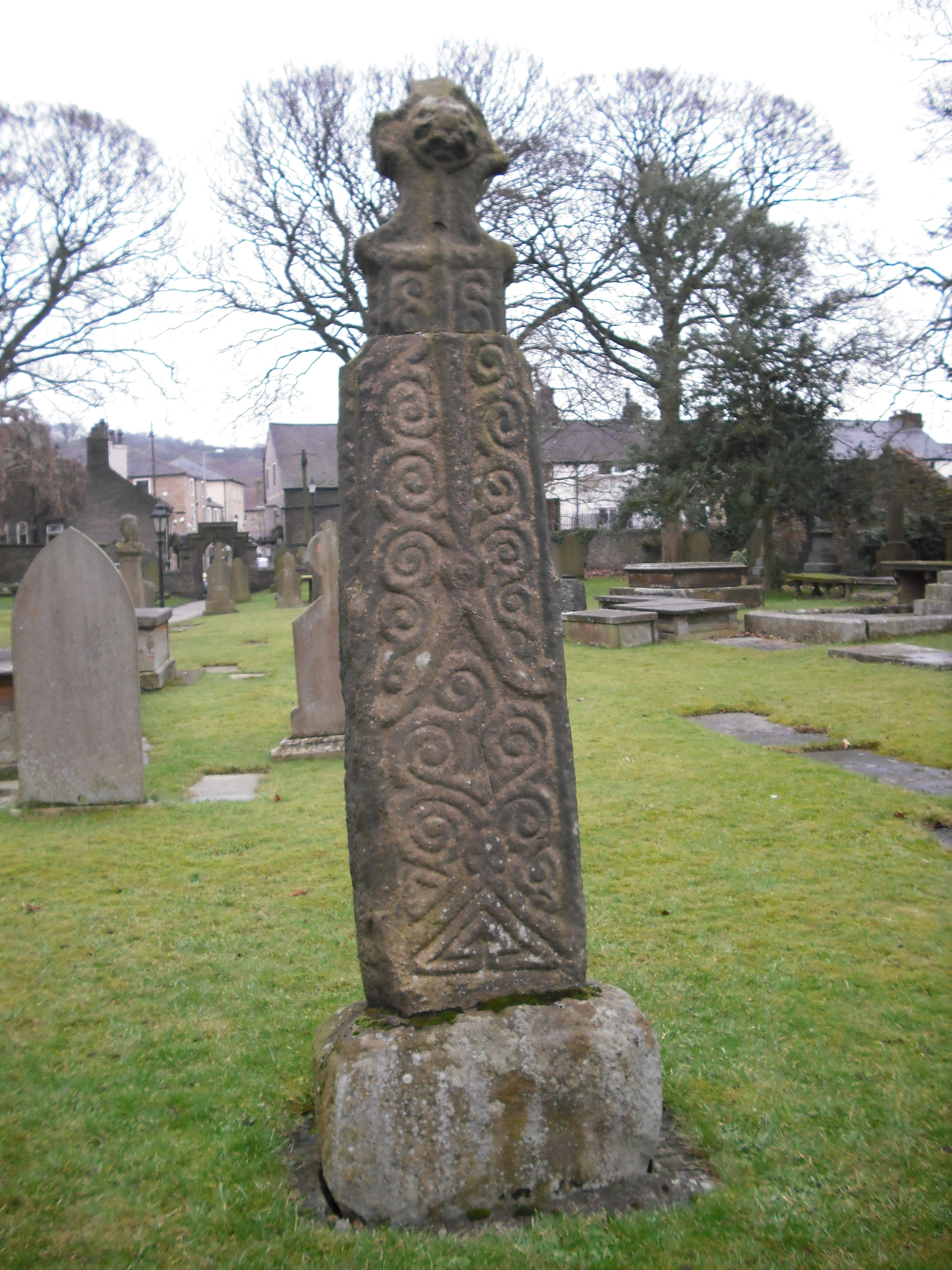
Anglo-Saxon cross in the churchyard of St Mary and All Saints parish church

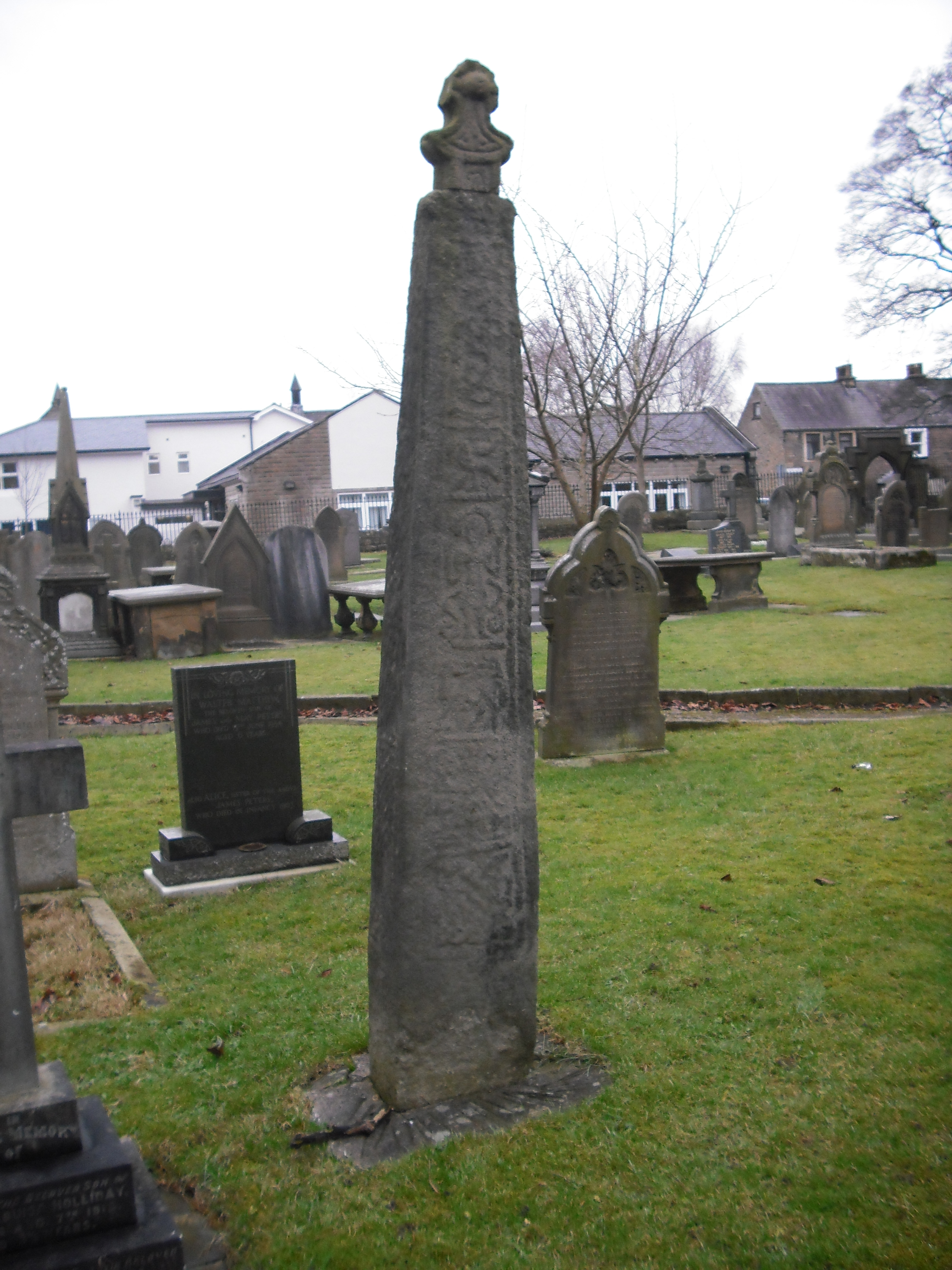
Second Anglo-Saxon cross in the churchyard

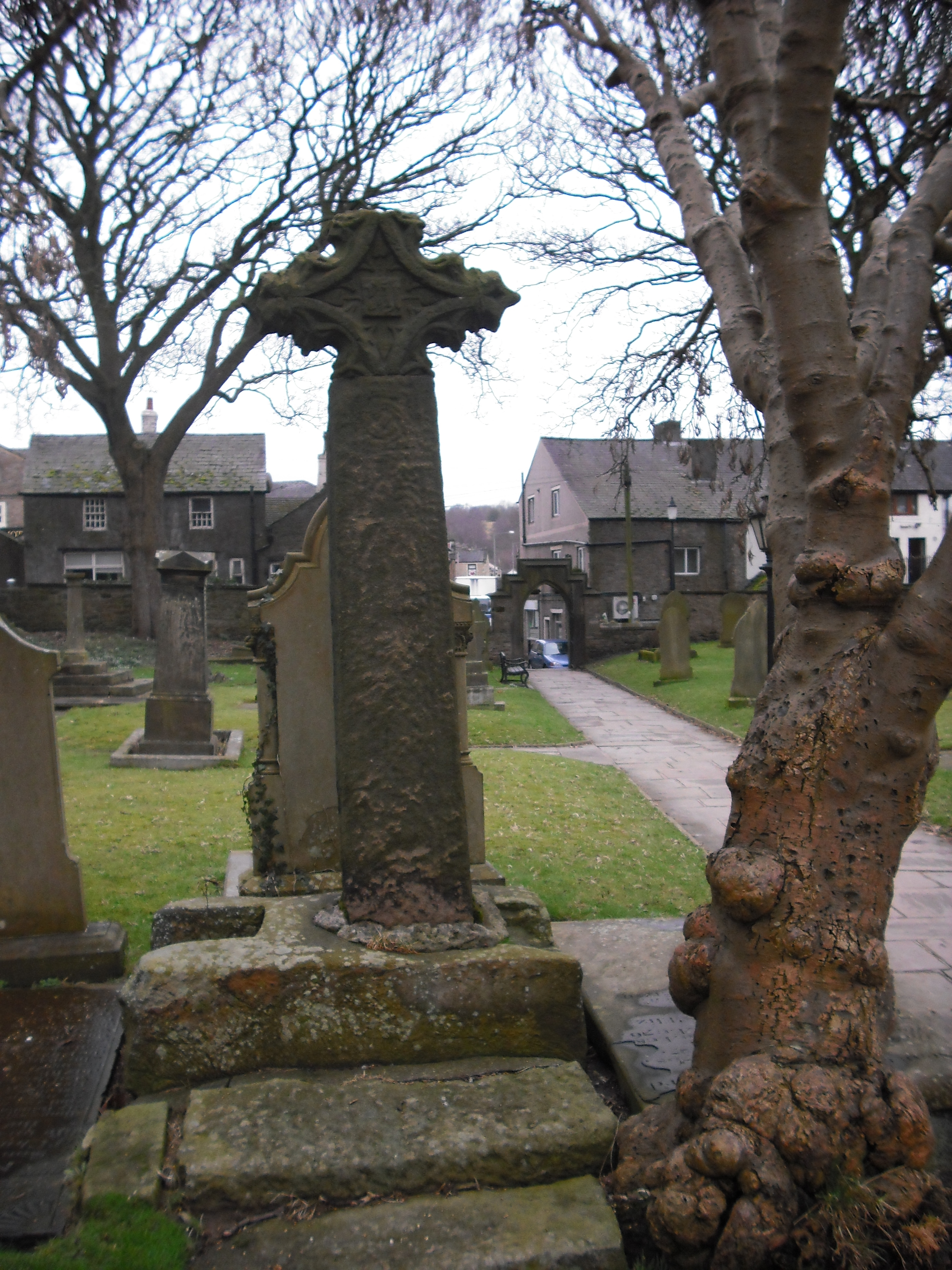
Third Anglo-Saxon cross in the churchyard

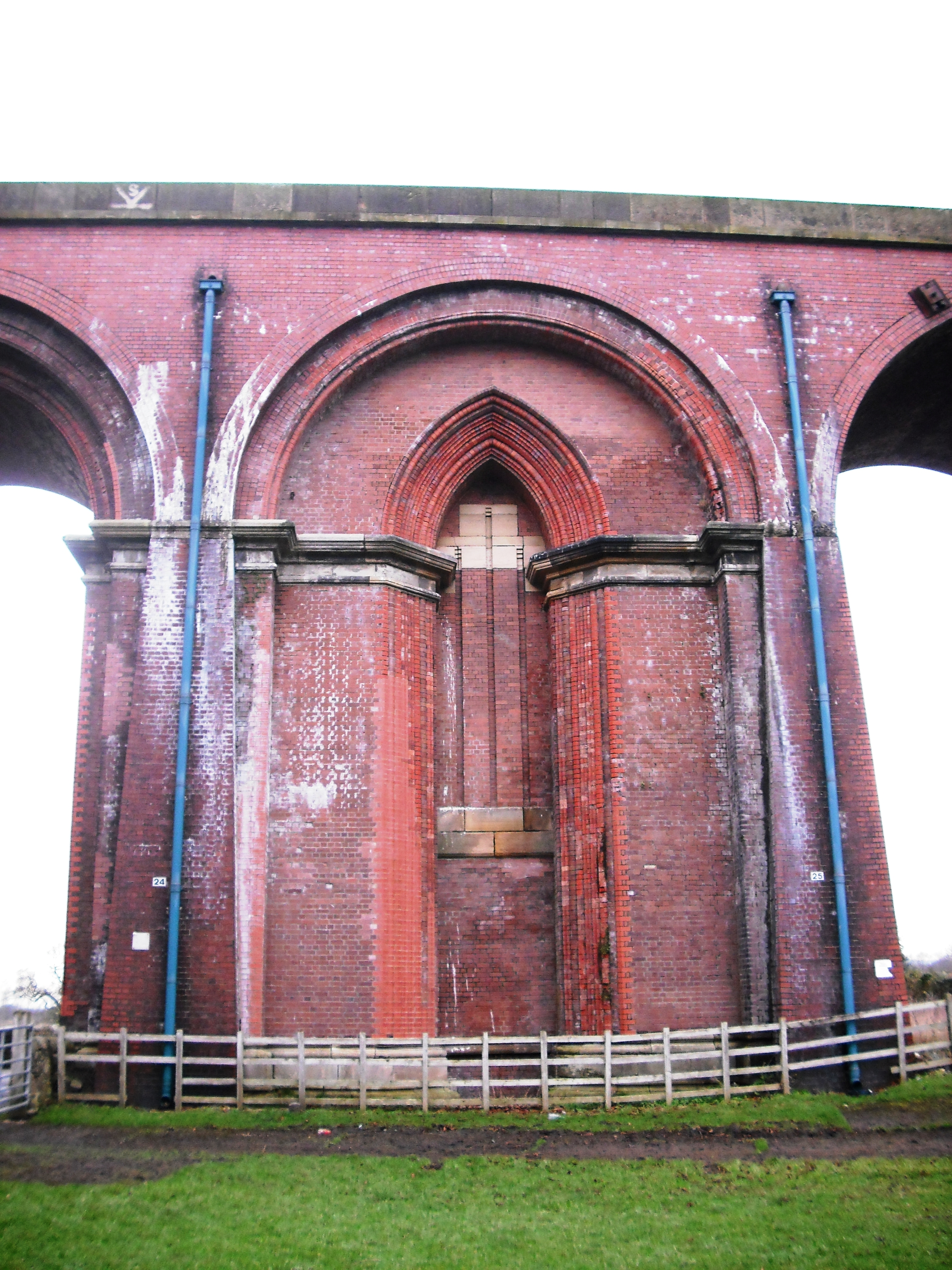
Whalley Arches, east side, detail

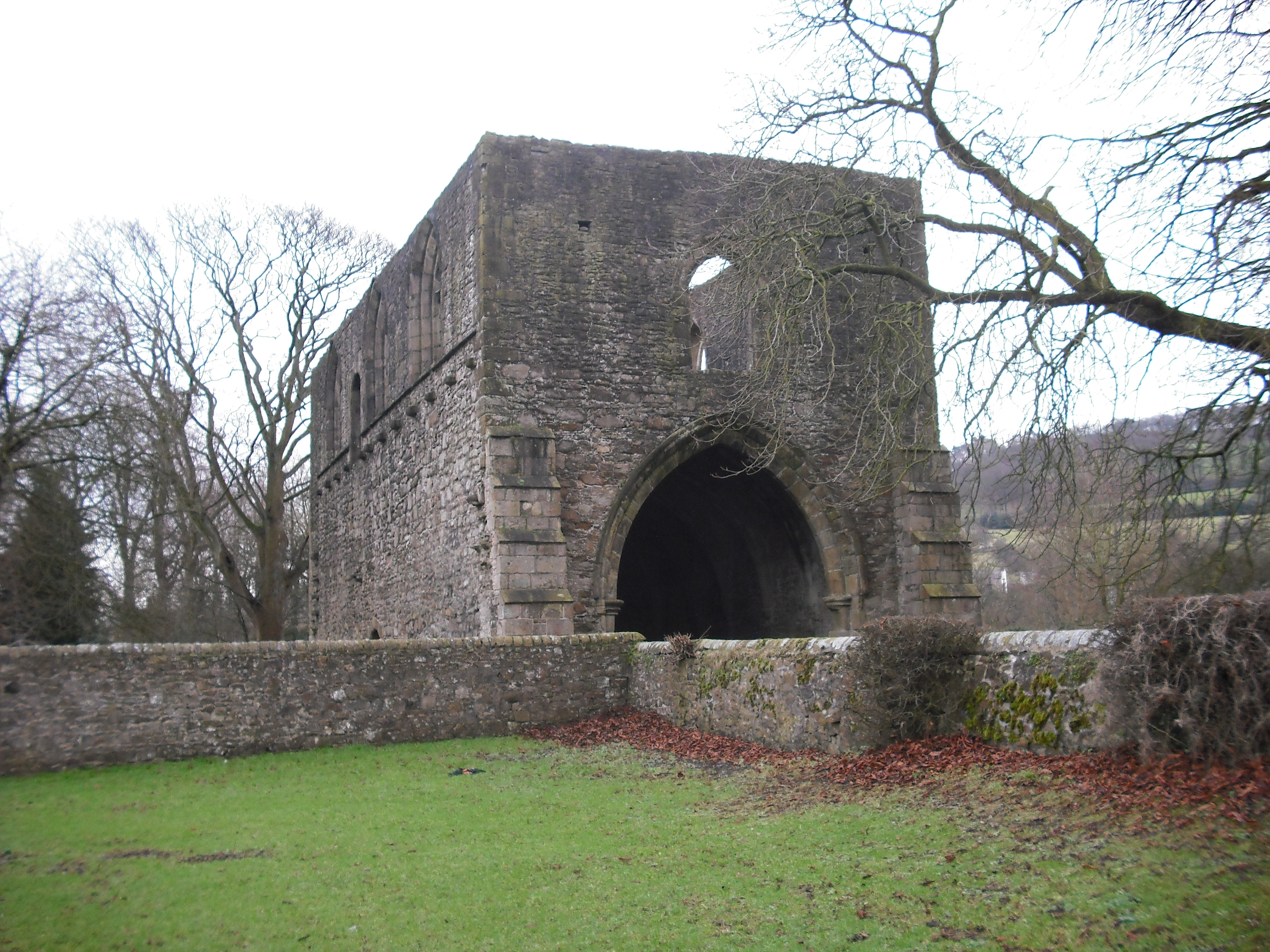
Whalley Gateway from the west

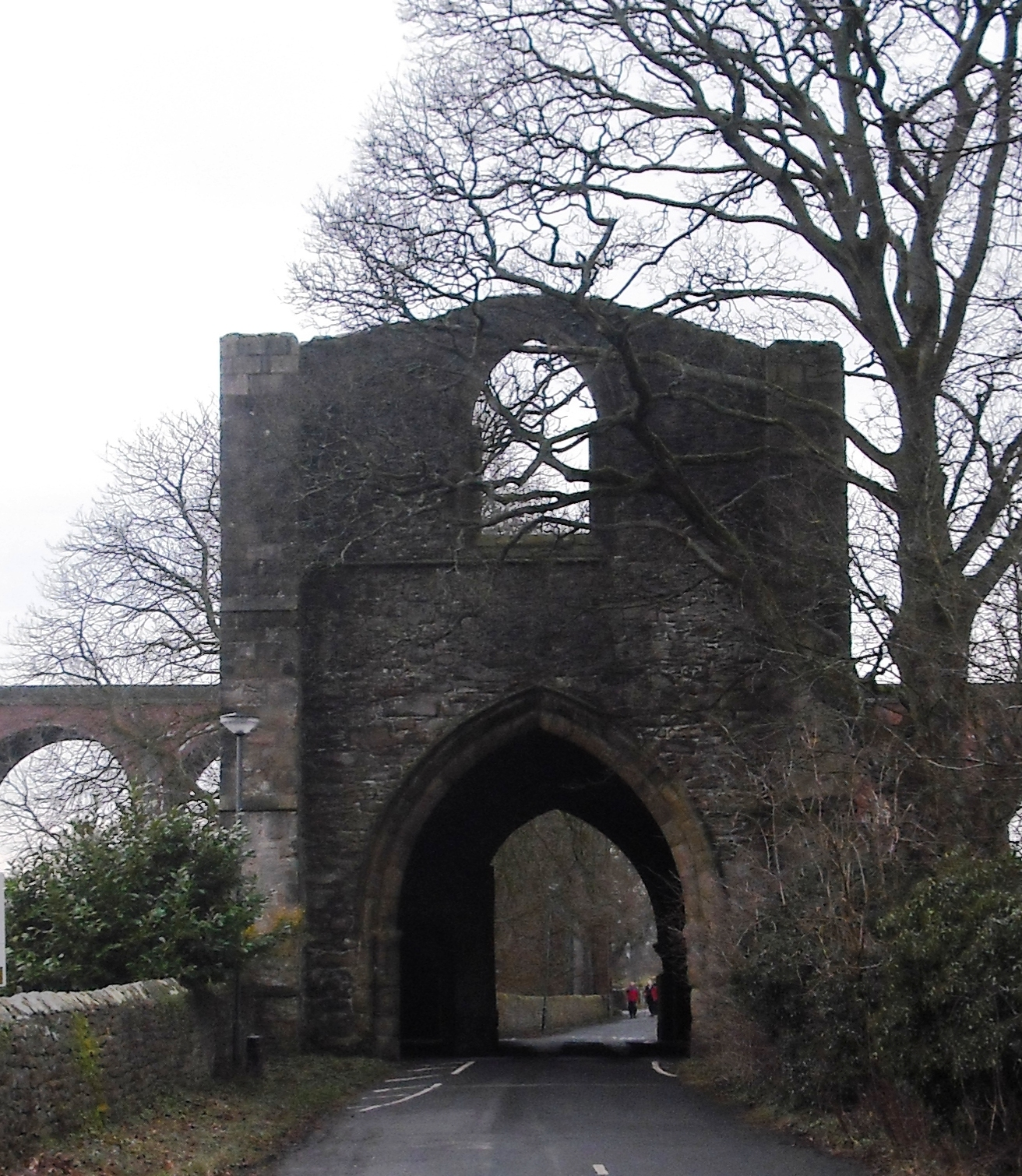
Whalley Gateway from the east

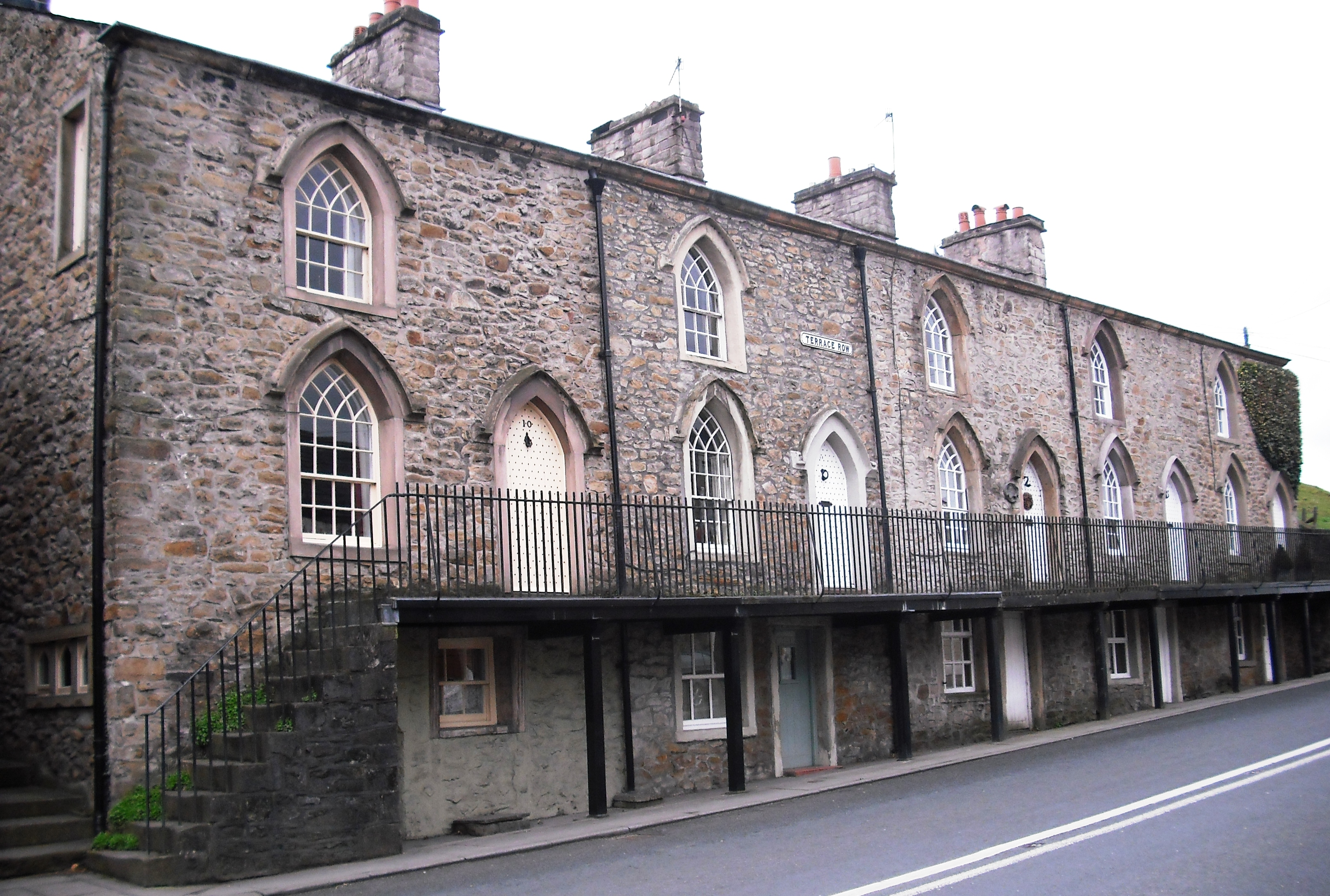
Terrace Row, Grade II listed

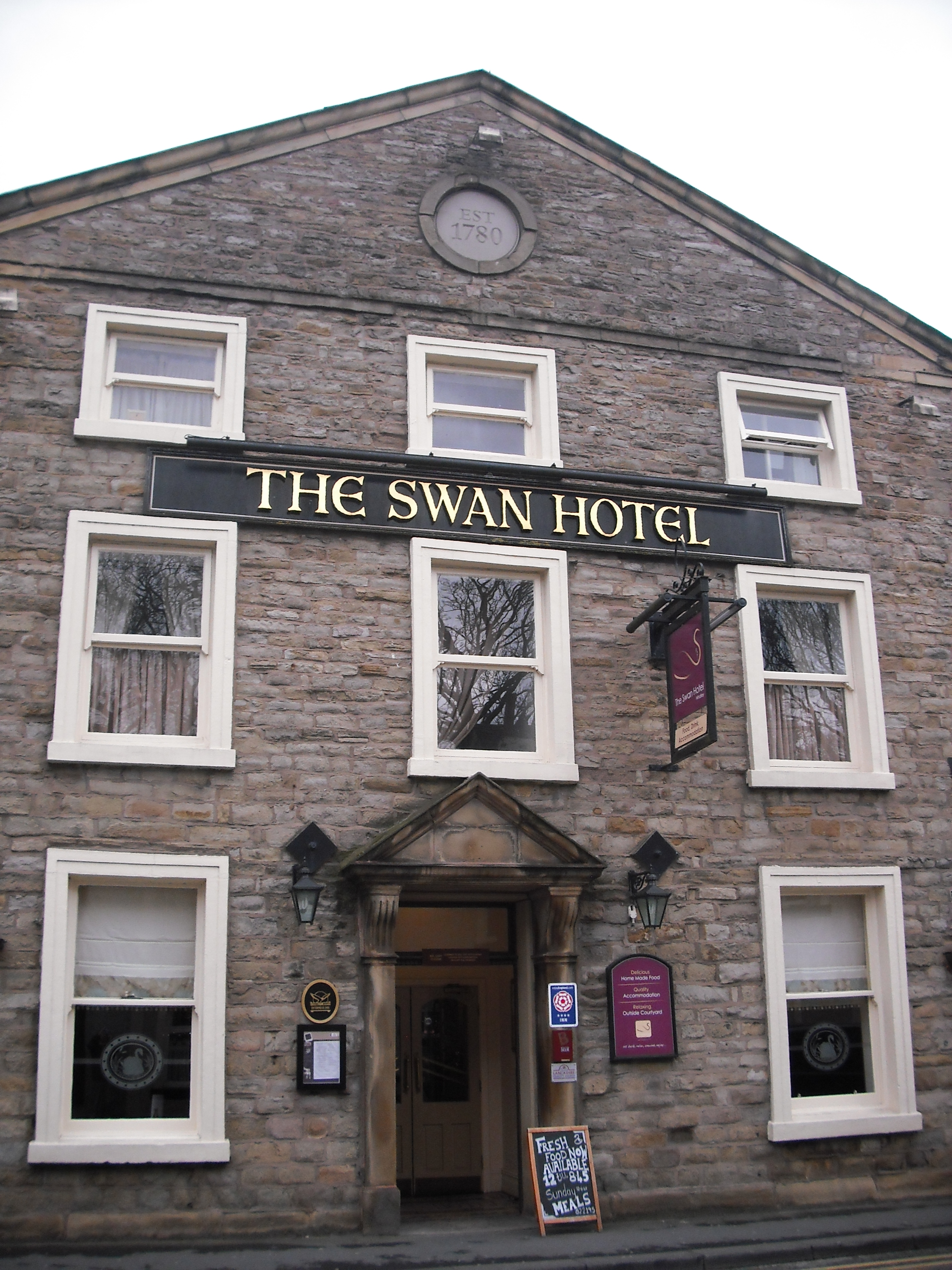
The Swan Hotel

== See also ==
- Listed buildings in Whalley, Lancashire
