= Bernard Reidy =

English cricketer (born 1953)

Bernard Wilfred Reidy
Cricket information
- Batting: Left-handed
- Bowling: Left-arm medium

Domestic team information
- Years: Team
- 1973-1982: Lancashire
- 1983–1992: Cumberland

Career statistics
Competition	First-class	List A
Matches	107	129
Runs scored	3,641	1,432
Batting average	26.77	17.04
100s/50s	1/18	1/6
Top score	131*	109*
Balls bowled	4,716	3,526
Wickets	60	71
Bowling average	41.80	35.19
5 wickets in innings	1	0
10 wickets in match	0	0
Best bowling	5/61	4/27
Catches/stumpings	65/–	29/–
- Source: Cricinfo, 15 November 2022

Bernard Wilfrid Reidy is a retired first-class cricketer. Born in Whalley, Lancashire in 1953, he played for Lancashire in first-class cricket from 1973 to 1982 and played his last one day match in 1989. A burly left-handed all rounder, he took 60 first-class wickets with his medium paced swing and scored 3641 runs at 26.77 with 2 centuries and a best of 131* . He scored 1432 runs and took 71 wickets in the one day arena. He went on to play Minor county cricket for Cumberland.
