= Listed buildings in Whalley, Lancashire =

Whalley is a civil parish in Ribble Valley, Lancashire, England. It contains 29 listed buildings that are recorded in the National Heritage List for England. Of these, three are listed at Grade I, the highest of the three grades, one is at Grade II*, the middle grade, and the others are at Grade II, the lowest grade. The parish contains the small town of Whalley and surrounding countryside. The town has a long history and this is reflected in the oldest listed buildings, the parish church and the abbey. Most of the other listed buildings consist of houses and shops in the town. In addition there are two public houses, a sundial in the churchyard, a former school, a former corn mill, a war memorial and, outside the town, farmhouses and farm buildings, and a railway viaduct.

== Key ==
Grade	Criteria
I	Buildings of exceptional interest, sometimes considered to be internationally important
II*	Particularly important buildings of more than special interest
II	Buildings of national importance and special interest

== Buildings ==
Name and location	Photograph	Date	Notes	Grade
Church of St Mary and All Saints; 53.82119°N 2.40778°W		13th century	The tower was added and windows were altered in the late 15th century, and porches were added in 1844 and 1909. The church is built in sandstone with a stone-slate roof, and consists of a nave with a clerestory, aisles, a chancel, a north vestry, north and south porches, and a west tower. The tower has angle buttresses and an embattled parapet. There are fragments of Saxon carving in the south wall. The interior is notable for the quality of its woodwork, some of which was moved from Whalley Abbey.	I
Whalley Abbey; 53.8205°N 2.4095°W		c. 1320	A Cistercian abbey was created by monks who moved from Stanlow Abbey in Cheshire towards the end of the 13th century. The abbey was dissolved in 1537 and the site bought by the Assheton family. Parts of it were converted into a house, and the rest of the buildings became ruinous. The former house is used as a conference centre and part of the former cloister is used as a church hall. Elsewhere there are parts of walls, and the foundations, which have been excavated. The site is a Scheduled Monument.	I
Northwest gateway, Whalley Abbey; 53.82116°N 2.41310°W		Early 14th century	The gateway is in sandstone and has two storeys. There are entrances with arched opening in the east and west walls, which are buttressed. Inside is a rib vaulted roof in eight bays, and a wall with two openings, one smaller one with a pointed arch, the other larger with a segmental arch. There are doorways, some of which are blocked, and windows on the north and south walls. The gateway is included as part of the Scheduled Monument.	I
Sands Cottage; 53.82146°N 2.41197°W	—	15th century (probable)	The house was altered in the 16th century and later. It was originally timber-framed, and was encased in sandstone in the 18th century. The house consists of a main two-bay range with a single-bay cross wing on the left. The openings have plain surrounds, the doorway being in the left bay of the main range.	II*
Barn, Portfield Farm; 53.81616°N 2.38639°W	—	16th century	An aisled barn in sandstone with quoins and a slate roof. The east wall contains a wide entrance, ventilation holes, doors, and windows, some of which have been blocked. On the left gable wall are two doorways. Inside the barn are two five-bay aisles.	II
Park Head Farmhouse; 53.80923°N 2.38674°W	—	Early 17th century (probable)	The house was altered in 1838. It is in sandstone with a stone-slate roof, and has two storeys. The windows are mullioned, or mullioned and transomed. The main range is in two bays, and has a single-storey gabled porch and a doorway with a chamfered surround and a pointed arch. Above it is an inscribed plaque. On the left is a single-bay cross wing, and there are finials on the right gable.	II
1, 2 and 3 Poole End; 53.82150°N 2.40871°W		Mid 17th century	Originally one house, later converted into three, they are in sandstone and have a slate roof. There are two storeys and a south front of four bays. The windows are mullioned with chamfered surrounds and hoods. On the south front is a blocked doorway, the open doorways being on the north front.	II
Abbeycroft; 53.82082°N 2.41267°W		17th century	Originally one house, later converted into three dwellings, it is in sandstone with a roof of slate and stone-slate, and has two storeys with attics. The windows and doorways have chamfered surrounds and each window contains a central mullion. Inside there is a least one bressumer.	II
20 and 22 King Street; 53.81976°N 2.40634°W		Late 17th century	A pair of sandstone houses with a tile roof in two storeys. No 20 has two bays, and No. 22 has one. The doorways have chamfered surrounds. The upper floor windows are mullioned, and those in the lower floor are sashes.	II
Clerk Hill; 53.82223°N 2.38406°W		1719	A country house in sandstone with a hipped slate roof in two storeys, and in Georgian style. The front has a recessed centre of three bays and two-bay wings. Between the wings is a single-storey loggia carried on Tuscan columns. The windows are sashes with architraves, and the central doorway also has an architrave. In the left wing is a single-storey canted bay window. At the rear are Venetian windows and a stair window.	II
Grammar school 53.82346°N 2.40658°W		1725	The former grammar school was extended in the 19th century, and has since been used for other purposes. It is in sandstone with a hipped slate roof, and has two storeys. The main front has a central gabled two-storey porch flanked on each side by two bays. The windows are cross windows with hoods, one of which has been replaced by a doorway. The main doorway in the porch has a moulded surround and a Tudor arched head, above which is a window and a plaque containing a blank shield. The south front has five bays, and contains cross windows and sash windows. There is a round-headed stair window in the north front.	II
33 and 35 King Street; 53.82035°N 2.40666°W		Mid 18th century	A row of houses and shops in red brick with sandstone dressings, quoins, and a slate roof. They have three storeys and ten bays. In the ground floor are two modern shop fronts, the other windows being sashes with keystones. Two of the doorways have architraves with keystones.	II
Lodge, Whalley Abbey; 53.81913°N 2.40696°W	—	Mid 18th century (probable)	The lodge is in sandstone with a stone-slate roof, and has two storeys. In the north wall is a doorway with an architrave, and in the right gable wall are two two-light mullioned windows with chamfered surrounds. Against the north wall is a lean-two addition.	II
Sundial; 53.82114°N 2.40713°W		1757	The sundial is in the churchyard of Church of St Mary and All Saints. It is in sandstone, and consists of a Tuscan column on three square steps. On the top is a brass plate and a gnomon.	II
Swan Hotel; 53.82123°N 2.40637°W		1780	The public house is in sandstone with a slate roof, and has three storeys. The symmetrical front has seven bays, the central three bays projecting forward under a pediment containing an oculus. The windows are sashes, and in the central bay is a doorway with a pediment on brackets.	II
Whalley Arms; 53.82089°N 2.40630°W		1781	A public house in sandstone with quoins and a slate roof, in two storeys with an attic, and with a front of three bays. The windows are sashes with plain surrounds, and in the right bay is a single-storey canted bay window. The central doorway has an architrave and a pediment on console brackets. In the left three-bay gable wall the outer ground floor windows have round heads and keystones; the central window has been converted from a doorway and has an architrave, pilasters, and a segmental pediment. Under the gable is a re-used 17th-century mullioned window, and a plaque.	II
82 King Street; 53.82287°N 2.40616°W	—	c. 1800	A sandstone house with a stone-slate roof, in three storeys and three bays. The windows are sashes with plain surrounds, and those in the ground floor have three lights and mullions. The central doorway has a round head with voussoirs, and a fanlight.	II
Abbey Presbytery; 53.82069°N 2.41120°W		c. 1800	Originally a farmhouse, and later a Roman Catholic presbytery, it is in sandstone with a slate roof. The building is in two storeys and three bays, and has a central single-storey gabled porch. The windows and the outer doorway of the porch have slightly arched heads and hoods, and the windows are sashes.	II
10–13 Church Lane; 53.82153°N 2.40796°W		Early 19th century	A row of four sandstone houses with slate roofs in two storeys. Each house has one bay. The doorways and windows have plain surrounds, and the windows are modern.	II
16 Church Lane; 53.82156°N 2.40837°W	—	Early 19th century	The house is at the end of a row, and is in sandstone with a slate roof. There are two storeys and one bay. The windows and doorway have plain surrounds, and the windows are sashes.	II
14 and 15 Church Lane; 53.82155°N 2.40825°W		Early to mid 19th century (probable)	A mirrored pair of houses in sandstone with two storeys. The roof of No. 15 is in slate, and that of No. 14 is in stone-slate. Each house has one bay. The windows and doorways have plain surrounds and hoods, and the windows are sashes.	II
Moreton Lodge; 53.80824°N 2.38780°W		1833	The lodge to the former Moreton Hall was designed by George Webster in Jacobean style. It is in sandstone with a slate roof, and has one storey. The symmetrical front facing the drive has a central steeply-gabled porch flanked by windows each with a chamfered surround and a single transom. The doorway has a moulded round-arched head with moulded imposts and a fluted keystone. Above the doorway is an inscribed plaque, and on the gables are finials. On the front facing the road is a mullioned and transomed window.	II
Barn, Park Head Farm; 53.80918°N 2.38617°W	—	1830s (probable)	The barn is in sandstone with quoins and a slate roof. On the front is a wide entrance with a canopy, and there is a similar entrance at the rear. There are ball finials on the gables.	II
Abbey Corn Mill; 53.81965°N 2.40738°W		1837	The mill and associated buildings are in stone with quoins and slate roofs. The main building has four storeys and three bays with a lean-to wheel-house to the north containing an undershot water wheel. There is a lower two-storey range to the east, and associated two-storey cottages. The windows are sashes. The complex has been converted into flats.	II
1, 2 and 3 The Square; 53.82144°N 2.40892°W		Mid 19th century	A row of three sandstone houses with a slate roof, in two storeys. No. 1 has two bays, and the other houses have one bay each. The windows of No. 3 are sashes, and the others are modern. Nos. 1 and 2 have modern porches, and the doorway of No. 3 has a plain surround.	II
Gate piers 53.81918°N 2.40691°W	—	Mid 19th century (probable)	The pair of gate piers stands at the entrance to the grounds of Whalley Abbey. The piers are in sandstone, have a square plan, chamfered rustication shafts, and caps with ball finials.	II
Poole House; 53.82154°N 2.40887°W	—	Mid 19th century	A sandstone house with a slate roof in two storeys and three bays. The windows and doors have chamfered surrounds and moulded hoods. The windows are mullioned, and the doorway has a Tudor arched head.	II
Whalley Viaduct; 53.82188°N 2.41390°W		1850	The viaduct was built to carry the Bolton, Blackburn, Clitheroe and West Yorkshire Railway over the valley of the River Calder. It is in red and blue brick, and is carried on 48 arches with tapering piers. The arches close to the gateway of Whalley Abbey are blind and in Gothic style.	II
War Memorial; 53.82346°N 2.40640°W		1921	The war memorial, designed by Percy Worthington, is in Portland stone. It has a tall, tapering cross shaft, the top of which is carved with the figure of Christ in relief. The shaft stands on a large square base on which is inscribed the names of those who died on the First World War. On the front is an open book containing the names of those lost in the Second World War and in later conflicts. The memorial stands on sets of steps.	II
