= Station Road Ground =

Cricket ground in Whalley, Lancashire, England

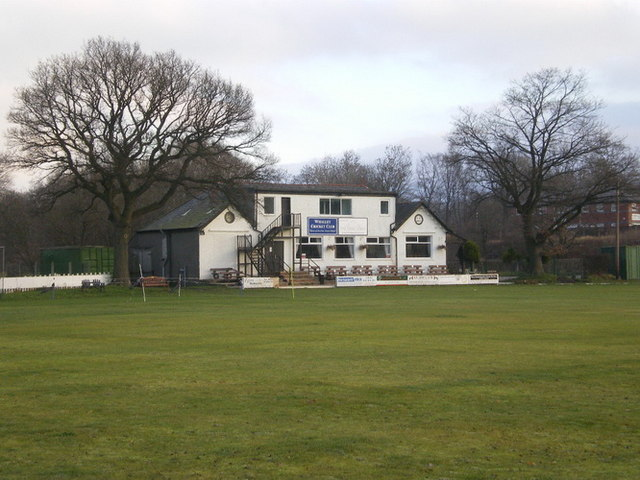
- Interactive map of Station Road Ground

Ground information
- Location: Whalley, Lancashire
- Country: England
- Coordinates: 53.8253°N 2.4125°W
- Establishment: 1860

Team information
Lancashire	(1867)
- As of 4 September 2010; Source: profile

Station Road Ground is a cricket ground located off Station Road in Whalley, Lancashire. The ground is bordered to the north and west by other sports fields, while to the south it is bordered by residential housing and to the east by the Ribble Valley Line and Whalley railway station.

The ground was established in 1860, five years after the founding of Whalley Cricket Club. The first recorded match on the ground was in 1864, when Whalley played an All England Eleven. Three years later the ground held the only first-class match to be played there, between Lancashire played Yorkshire in what was the first Roses Match. Yorkshire won this first fixture by an innings and 56 runs, with Lancashire's Arthur Appleby taking the first five wicket haul in the match with 6/62 in Yorkshire's first-innings, but he surpassed by Yorkshire's George Freeman who took 7/10 in Lancashire first-innings and 5/41 in their follow-on. The ground is still used by Whalley Cricket Club.

== See also ==
- List of cricket grounds in England and Wales
