= Hugh Fort =

English barrister-at-law

Sir Hugh Fort
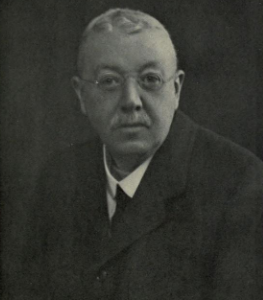
- Born: 1862
- Died: 28 May 1919 (aged 56–57)
- Occupation: Barrister-at-law
- Years active: 1887-1911
- Honours: Knighted in 1911

Sir Hugh Fort (1862 – 28 May 1919) was an English barrister-at-law who served on the Legislative Council of the Straits Settlements at the beginning of the twentieth century.

== Early life and education ==
Hugh Fort was born in 1862, son of Richard Fort of Whalley, Lancashire, who was member of parliament for Clitheroe. He was educated at Winchester and New College, Oxford, and in 1887 was called to the bar at the Inner Temple, London.

== Career ==
In 1887, he went to Singapore for health reasons, and joined the firm of Donaldson and Burkinshaw, becoming its head in 1893 after being admitted to the local bar the same year. During his 18 years at the bar, he became one of its leading members and held in high esteem, being considered one of the "Big Four" of the legal profession in Malaya at the end of the nineteenth century and early twentieth century. He had a reputation as a formidable advocate, became head of the Singapore bar, and it was said he possessed the best brain of any man who had come to the Straits Settlements.

In most large cases, he was usually instructed, including many high-profile cases such as the Tanjong Pagar Dock Company proceedings in London, the Tilleke jewel-robbery case in Bangkok where he secured the acquittal on appeal of A. Tilleke, proprietor of the Siam Observer, and the application for a writ of habeas corpus to secure, unsuccessfully, the release of José Rizal, Filipino nationalist, who was being held prisoner on a ship docked in Singapore on its return to Manila.

From 1905 to 1910, he served as an unofficial member of the Legislative Council of the Straits Settlements where he advised and assisted the government with the introduction of many new laws, sitting on various commissions with the Attorney-General and the Chief Justice, which were established to consider and draft the new legislation.

Fort retired to England in 1911, and died on 28 May 1919 in London.

== Personal life ==
Fort played a prominent role in public life in Singapore. He was a keen sportsman, served as president of the Singapore Cricket Club, presided over committee meetings of the Racing Club, and was a racehorse owner. He never married.

== Honours ==
Fort received the honour of Knighthood in 1911, shortly after his retirement.
