= Roses Match =

Cricket match

The Roses Match refers to any game of cricket played between Yorkshire County Cricket Club and Lancashire County Cricket Club. Yorkshire's emblem is the white rose, while Lancashire's is the red rose. The associations go back to the Wars of the Roses in the 15th century. These matches have a long and proud history and are traditionally the hardest fought matches in the English first class game, with many dour draws recorded as both teams battled to avoid the ignominy of defeat.

The term is occasionally used in connection with other sports where Lancashire play Yorkshire, such as rugby union and rugby league (War of the Roses).

== Early days ==
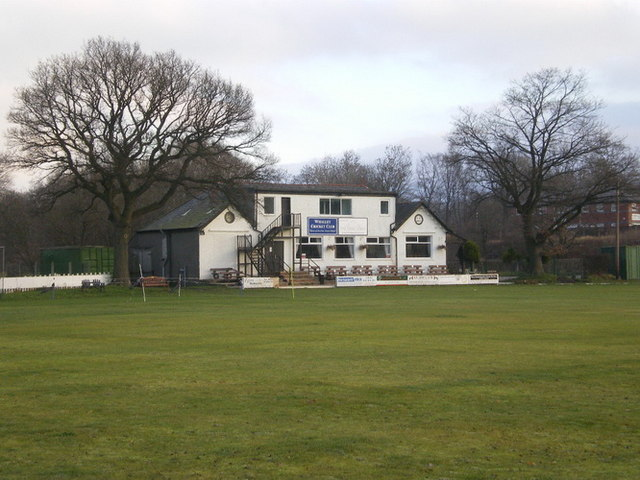
The Station Road Ground in Whalley, site of the first ever Roses Match

The first First Class Match between Yorkshire and Lancashire was in 1849 with Yorkshire winning by 5 wickets at the Hyde Park Ground in Sheffield. The very first "Roses Match" was played in 1867 at the Station Road Cricket Ground, Whalley near Blackburn and was won by Yorkshire by 5 wickets. The first match in the newly constituted County Championship, in 1890, ended in the inevitable draw. Including first class matches, second team fixtures, one day games and other representative matches there have been over 600 Roses Matches over the century and a half since the first one.

In the match played over the Whitsuntide bank holiday in June 1924 Lancashire were skittled for just 74 in their second innings, leaving Yorkshire a target of just 58 the next day. Despite opening with Percy Holmes and Herbert Sutcliffe Yorkshire were dispatched for just 33 by Cecil Parkin and Dick Tyldesley, Lancashire's first win in Yorkshire for 25 years.

At the Old Trafford Roses Match in 1926, a record 78,617 spectators paid to watch the match peter out into a high scoring draw, with centuries from Lancashire's Harry Makepeace (126), Ernest Tyldesley (139) and 92 from Frank Watson being answered by Yorkshire legends Percy Holmes (143) and Herbert Sutcliffe (89) who put on 199 as if to make amends for events 2 years previously. Leonard Green, Lancashire's captain, was batting when the score stood at 499. Neville Cardus relates the story that Green said to himself "It's not likely that Lancashire ever again will score 500 against Yorkshire, so I'm going to get this single run if it kills me." He pushed a ball from Wilfred Rhodes to the off-side and ran 'like the wind'. The ball was hurled back in anger by Yorkshire legend Emmott Robinson, striking Rhodes on the wrist while Green dived to make his ground. Picking himself up he heard Rhodes muttering to himself:

"There's somebody runnin' up and down this wicket. Ah don't know who it is, but there's some-body runnin' up and down this wicket." The operative words in that famous lamentation are, "Ah don't know who it is."

== Batting feats ==
Lancashire finally surpassed their 1926 record total of 509 for 9 declared in 2005 in another high scoring draw when they posted 537 thanks to skipper Mark Chilton and Iain Sutcliffe's opening partnership of 223. This was their side's highest first-wicket stand against Yorkshire, beating Reggie Spooner and Harry Makepeace's 181 at Old Trafford in 1912. In 2021 Lancashire matched the exact total from 2005 going 509/9(dec) with huge efforts from Keaton Jennings 114(260) a rapid fire 52(57) from Alex Davies & Josh Bohannon 127(277).

In an effort to break the dominance of the batsmen on such featherbed pitches, and years before the infamous bodyline series, Ted McDonald, an Australian fast bowler, used a version of 'leg theory' in the Roses match at Old Trafford the following year in 1927, bowling to a 4-man leg trap with no slips.

== Bowling feats ==
There have been many outstanding bowling performances in Roses Matches, not least Jack Iddon's 9 for 42 for Lancashire in 1937 while the brilliant Yorkshire left arm spinner Johnny Wardle took 9 for 25 on a rain-affected pitch at Old Trafford in 1954. Fred Trueman made his debut in the 1949 game while his longtime England partner, Lancashire legend Brian Statham, made a big impact aged just 20 in his first Roses match in August 1950, when he shocked a packed Old Trafford crowd by falling flat on his face at the start of his opening spell. He picked himself up, dusted himself down and later that over ripped out Frank Lowson's middle stump. He soon dismissed Ted Lester and Willie Watson for 2 more ducks and Wisden said his bowling "bordered on the sensational".

Not to be outdone Fred Trueman was always keen to entertain the crowds, even during one of the slower passages of play. On one occasion, before a packed Old Trafford Roses crowd, he was returning the ball with his party piece left-handed throw from deep mid-wicket when he slipped and fired the ball high over the startled wicket keeper to the third-man boundary. Renowned for his mastery of seam and swing, and ebullient self-confidence, he was once asked by a straight faced Richard Hutton if he'd ever bowled a straight ball. Fred didn't miss a beat "Aye, I did. It went straight through Peter Marner [of Lancashire] like a streak o'piss and flattened all three."

In the 2021 version of the Roses Battle hosted at Emirates Old Trafford Lancashire bowled Yorkshire all out for 159 with efforts from Tom Bailey, Danny Lamb, and Matt Parkinson. After going 509/9(dec) in the middle innings Lancs were going for the innings defeat. Matt Parkinson bowled 41.2 overs, had 17 maidens, an economy of 1.47, and took 3 wickets. Saqib Mahmood bowled 26 overs, had nine maidens, had an economy of 1.80, and took 5 wickets. Tom Bailey bowled 19 overs with an economy of 1.57, 11 maidens, and snagged a wicket of his own. This bowling performance between the two innings will live long in the minds of fans of the Red Rose as it was inspirational. It helped Lancs notch their first County Cup win at E.O.T. against their rivals in a decade.

== Modern times ==
The Roses Match was broadcast on ITV by Granada Television, shown in Lancashire and Yorkshire Television between the 1970s and the late 1980s. Matches were shown in these and other ITV regions in the United Kingdom.

The 1987 Roses match at Old Trafford, parts of which were so televised, produced a notably tense climax, Yorkshire's last pair of Richard Blakey and Stuart Fletcher hanging on in an unbroken stand of 38 to avoid defeat. As Lancashire finished only four points behind champions Nottinghamshire in the 1987 County Championship, if the last wicket had fallen Lancashire could have been county champions that year.

Yorkshire and Lancashire played two Roses Matches a season home and away in the County Championship. In 1993 the Championship was reduced so 18 teams would play each opponent once. For some seasons Yorkshire and Lancashire played an extra early season game to maintain home and away fixture. With a two division County Championship was introduced in 2000 with home and away games against each opponent which brought back two Roses Matches. In 2002 Yorkshire were relegated so there was a three-year break in games until their promotion back to the First Division.

Australian Darren Lehmann smashed 252 in just 288 balls in the Headingley Roses Match in 2001, the season in which Yorkshire regained the County Championship for the first time in over 30 years. Belying the fixture's turgid reputation, fellow Australians Stuart Law and Andrew Symonds have both made quickfire hundreds for the Red Rose County in recent years while Andrew Flintoff was no less destructive during his best of 160, 111 of his runs being smashed between start of play and lunch.

Yorkshire's Adam Lyth scored a career-best 251 in the fixture in September 2014, contributing to a record 6th wicket partnership of 296 with Adil Rashid.

In 2003, the Twenty20 Cup was introduced and for these matches the Yorkshire Carnegie now play the Lancashire Lightning. This has provided a fillip to the Roses fixture with very large crowds coming to grounds for this short format. 14,215 turned up for the 2006 match at Headingley in June 2006. A crowd of 17,000 turned up at Old Trafford for the 2008 fixture which Yorkshire won by 4 runs. In July 2013, a sell-out crowd of 17,500 at Headingley witnessed the first ever tied Twenty20 match between the sides. Up to the end of the 2013 season Yorkshire have won 9 games to Lancashire's 8, with a tie and a no result match.

In 2012, there was no Roses Match in the County Championship due to Yorkshire being relegated, with Lancashire winning both matches in the 2011 County Championship.

In June 2015, Jos Buttler led Lancashire Lightning to a last-ball victory over Yorkshire Vikings at Headingley in the most dramatic Twenty20 Rose match to date.

On 27 May 2021, Lancashire beat Yorkshire at home for their first Roses County Championship victory in a decade.

== Head to Head (1849–2021) ==
Match format	Total matches	Yorkshire	Lancashire	Tied	Match Drawn	No Result
First Class (3/4-day matches)	274	84	56	-	133	1
One Day Matches	67	25	35	-	-	7
Twenty20	32	12	14	2	-	4
