= Whalley Abbey =

Former Cistercian abbey in Lancashire, England

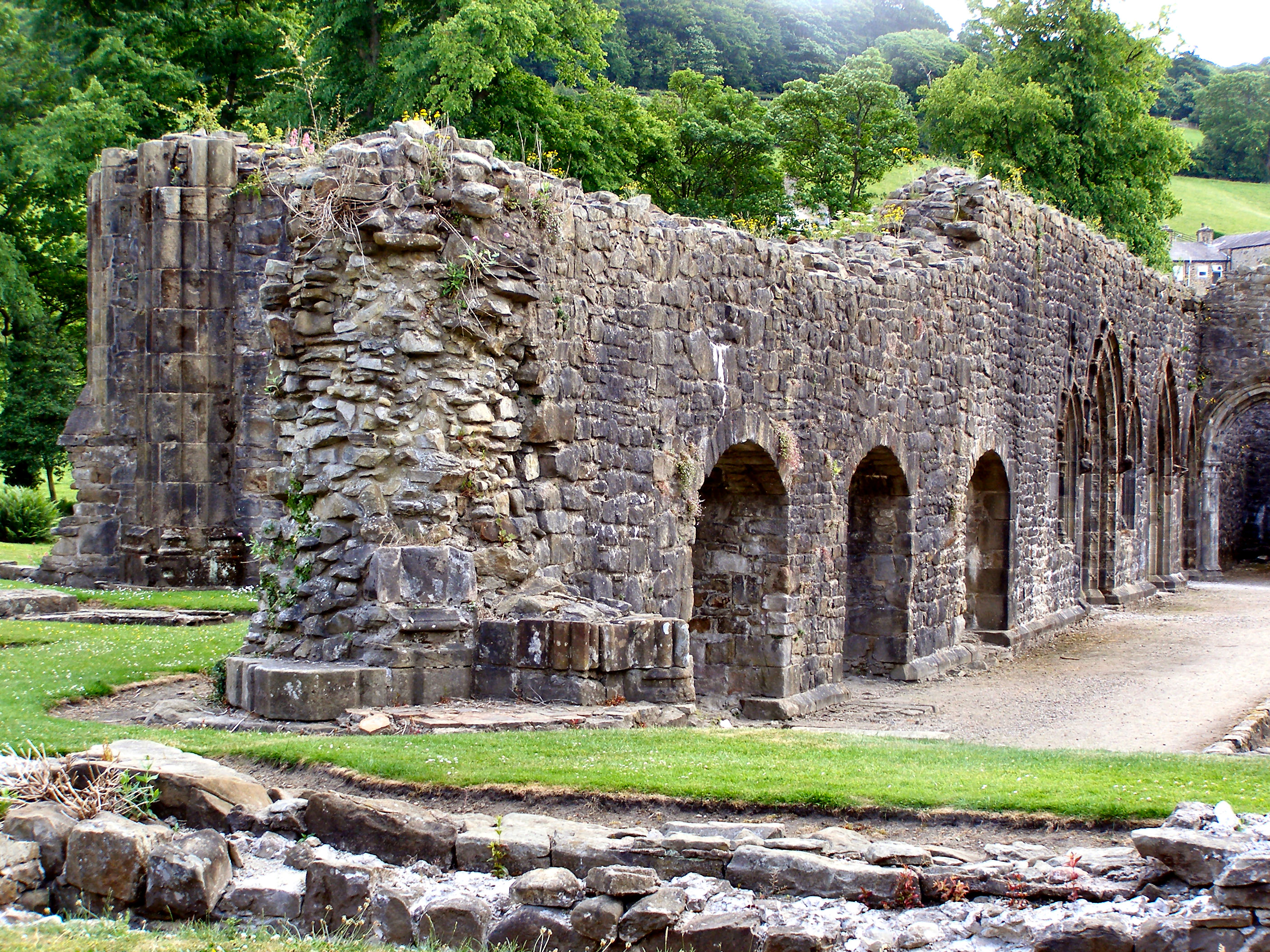
- Ruins of Whalley Abbey's claustral buildings

- Location in the Borough of Ribble Valley
- 53.8202°N 2.4104°W
- OS grid reference: SD 730 361

Listed Building – Grade I
- Designated: 13 February 1967
- Reference no.: 1164643

Scheduled monument
- Reference no.: 1008636

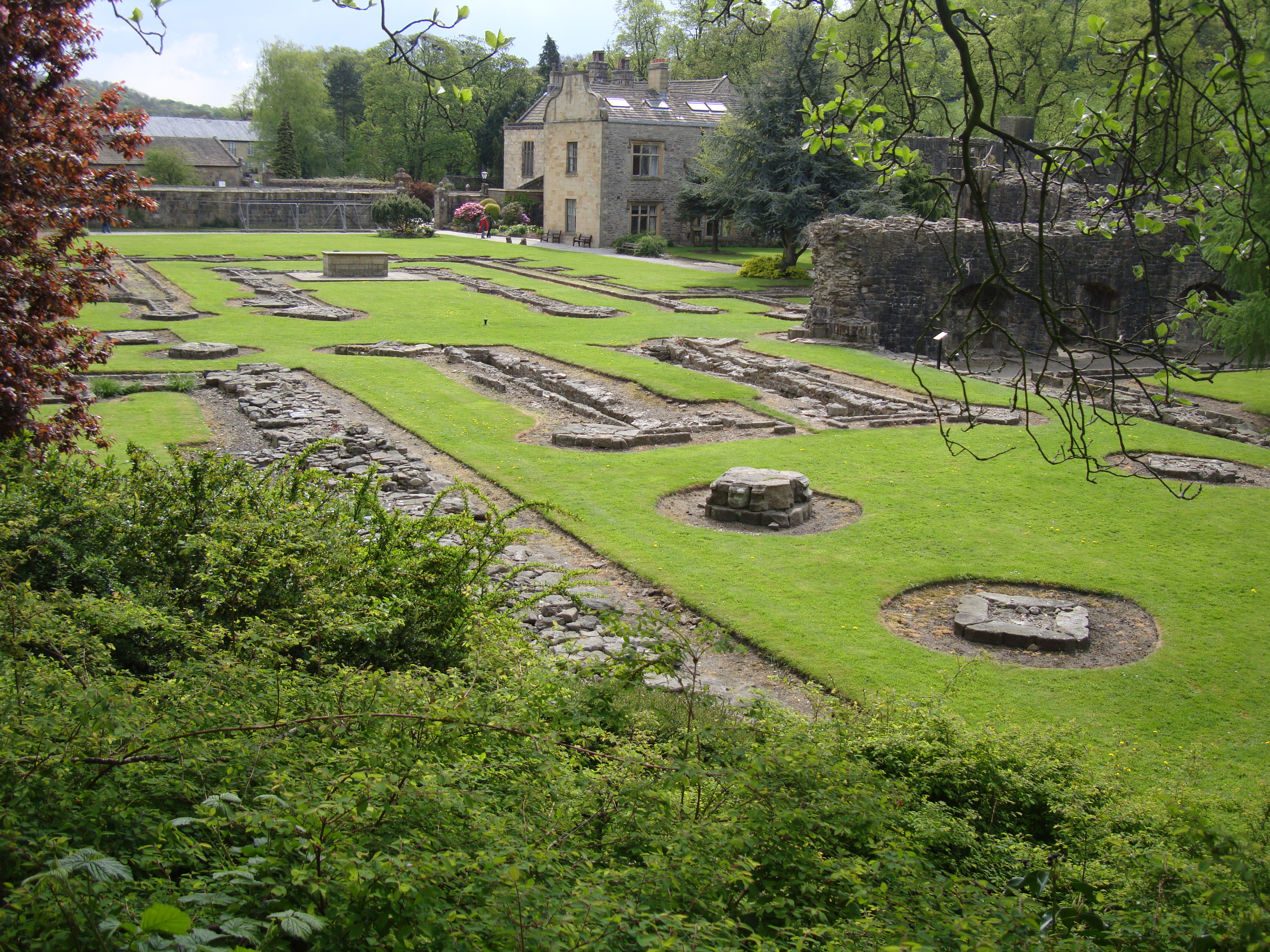
The remains of Whalley Abbey church

Whalley Abbey is a former Cistercian abbey in Whalley, Lancashire, England. After the dissolution of the monasteries, the abbey was largely demolished and a country house was built on the site. In the 20th century the house was modified and it is now the Retreat and Conference House of the Diocese of Blackburn of the Church of England. The ruins of the abbey are recorded in the National Heritage List for England as a designated Grade I listed building, and are a Scheduled Ancient Monument.

== History ==
=== Monastery ===
In 1296 the Cistercian monks from Stanlow Abbey moved to Whalley. Stanlow Abbey had been founded on the banks of the River Mersey in the 1170s by John fitz Richard, the constable of Chester. This abbey had suffered a series of misfortunes, including flooding in 1279, the destruction of the church tower in a gale in 1287 and a fire in 1289. In 1283 Henry de Lacy, tenth Baron of Halton agreed to the move from Stanlow to Whalley but this was not achieved until 1296. The first stone was laid by Henry de Lacy in June 1296.

The move caused concern at Sawley Abbey, just 7 miles away. The Cistercian monks there complained that they had both lost some of their income to Whalley and that the cost of food and building materials had increased in the face of the extra demand. The dispute was settled in 1305, at the general chapter of the Cistercian order. Whalley was commanded to offer any excess produce to Sawley at market rates, and should either abbey's members transgress against the other, those people would be sent to the opposing abbey for punishment.

At least part of the site was consecrated by the Thomas de Kirkcudbright, Bishop of Whithorn in 1306. Building proceeded slowly and the foundation stone of the church was laid in 1330. Stone for building the abbey was obtained from quarries at Read and Simonstone. A royal licence to build a crenellated wall around the site was obtained in 1339. The church was completed in 1380 but the remainder of the abbey was not finished until the 1440s. In 1480 the North East Gatehouse, which provided a new entrance to the abbey, was completed.

In the 16th century, John Paslew, the last Abbot of Whalley, reconstructed his own lodgings and added a Lady Chapel. The abbey closed in 1537 as part of the dissolution of the monasteries. Also that year Abbot Paslew was executed for high treason for his part in events connected with the Pilgrimage of Grace the previous year. A set of vestments, known as the Whalley Abbey Vestments, attributed to the abbey have survived and are now in the collection of Towneley Hall and the Burrell Collection.

=== Private house ===
In 1553 the abbey lands and the manor of Whalley were sold for just over £2,151 to John Braddyll of Brockhall and Richard Assheton of Lever near Bolton. The properties were divided and Assheton took the monastic site and buildings. The abbot's house and the infirmary buildings were demolished and a large house was built on the site. In the 17th century most of the remaining church and monastic buildings were pulled down. The house passed through a succession of owners and further alterations were made to it in the 19th century. Around 1900 the house and grounds were bought by Sir John Travis Cragg.

=== Modern religious centre ===
In 1923 the house and grounds were purchased by the Anglican Diocese of Manchester when the bishop was William Temple. When the diocese was divided in 1926, the property passed to the new Diocese of Blackburn. In 1930 Canon J. R. Lumb was appointed as the first warden of the centre and it has since become a centre of religious education with residential accommodation for guests. Two of the ground floor rooms have been converted into chapels. In the 1930s the site of the abbey church was excavated and the foundations discovered were exposed and consolidated.

== Present day ==
=== Retreat and conference house ===
The former private house, which is now a retreat and conference house, was reopened in September 2005 following refurbishment. It contains conference rooms, a dining room and en suite rooms for residents. The north range contains a visitor centre, with a coffee shop, exhibition centre and a bookshop. A spirituality programme is available for resident and non-resident guests. Guided tours of the abbey ruins can be arranged in the summer months.

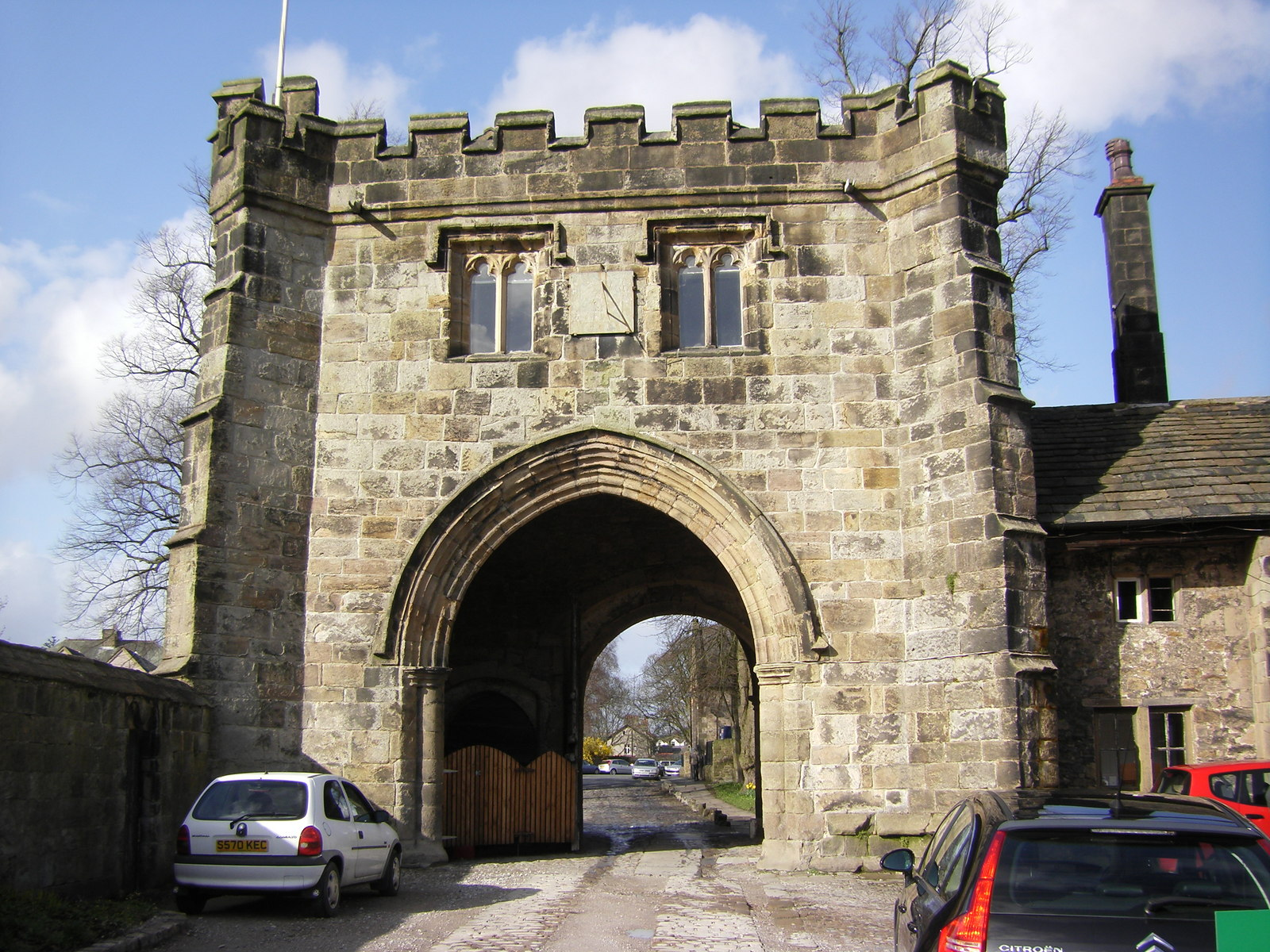
Whalley Abbey Gatehouse

=== Abbey ruins and grounds ===
Only the foundations of the church remain. The remains of the former monastic buildings are more extensive. The west range, which was the lay brothers' dormitory, consists of two storeys, and is roofed. This is currently used as a Roman Catholic church hall. To the south of the cloister, part of the walls of the former kitchen and refectory remain. The east range is more complete and includes parts of the walls of the former monks' day room, parlour and vestry.

=== Other related buildings ===
The North West Gateway is separately listed Grade I. It is built in sandstone rubble, is in two storeys and is roofless. It is also a Scheduled Ancient Monument. The lodge at the entrance to the abbey grounds is listed Grade II. It dates probably from the late 18th century, and is built in ashlar sandstone with a stone slate roof. Also listed Grade II are a pair of gatepiers at the entrance to the grounds.

=== Recent events ===
In August 2021 there was criminal damage to ancient ruins at the Abbey and drug taking, as well as shouting, swearing and screaming until the early hours, with 150 youths caught breaking laws. Underage drinking and harassment of the Reverend and his wife was reported as well as assaults on security staff, and on police officers. Neighbouring houses were pelted with stones.

== See also ==
- Grade I listed buildings in Lancashire
- Scheduled monuments in Lancashire
- Listed buildings in Whalley, Lancashire
