= Towneley Park =

Towneley Hall
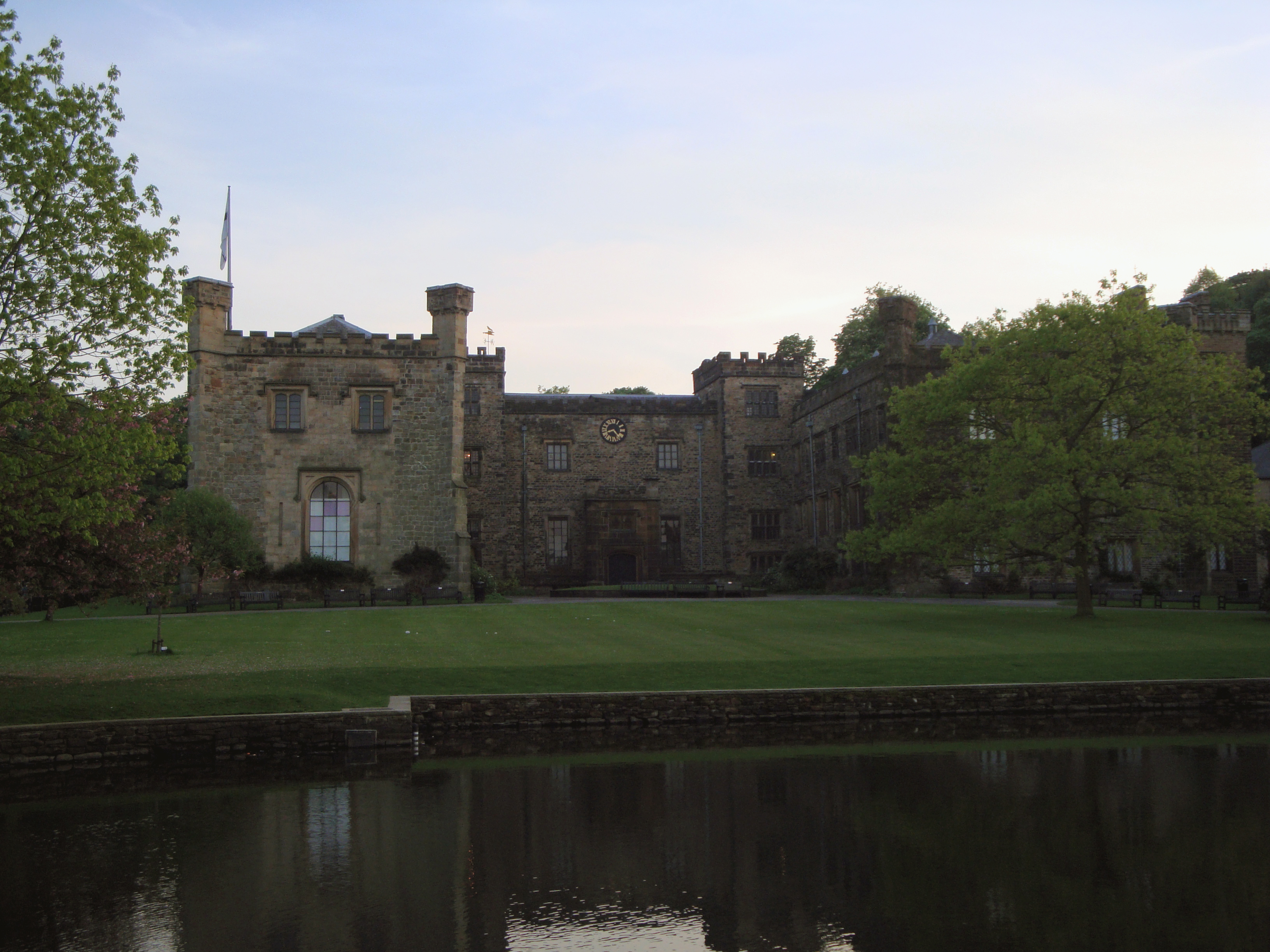
- Towneley Hall from the front

- Location within Burnley
- 53.7738°N 2.2225°W
- Location: Burnley, Lancashire

Site notes
- Area: 180 ha (440 acres)
- Architect: Various including Wyattville

Listed Building – Grade I
- Official name: Towneley Hall
- Designated: 10 November 1951
- Reference no.: 1247299 (Hall)

Scheduled monument
- Official name: Ice house at Towneley Hall
- Reference no.: 1005089

Listed Building – Grade II
- Official name: Towneley Hall
- Designated: 1 April 1986
- Reference no.: 1000954 (Park and Garden)

Towneley Park is owned and managed by Burnley Borough Council and is the largest and most popular park in Burnley, Lancashire, England. The main entrance to the park is within a mile of the town centre and the park extends to the south east, covering an area of some 180 hectares (440 acres). At the southern end of the park is Towneley Hall, a grade I listed building housing Burnley's art gallery and museum. To the north are golf courses and playing fields and to the south 24 acres of broadleaf woodland. On the southern boundary is a working farm called Towneley Farm with pastures and plantations extending eastwards into Cliviger.

== History ==
The hall was the home of the Towneley family from around 1200. The family once owned extensive estates in and around Lancashire and the West Riding of Yorkshire. The male line of the family died out in 1878 and in 1901 one of the daughters, Lady O'Hagan, sold the house together with 62 acres (250,000 m^{2}) of land to Burnley Corporation for £17,600. The family departed in March 1902.

Between 2005 and 2011, the Heritage Lottery Fund granted £2.1 million to help fund a major programme of restoration of the Park, which is grade II listed.

== Towneley Hall ==
The hall is a grade I listed building.

The hall not only contains the 15th-century Whalley Abbey vestments, but also has its own chapel – with a finely carved altarpiece made in Antwerp around 1525.

== Collections ==
The art gallery contains important Victorian and Pre-Raphaelite works by Burne-Jones, Waterhouse, Alma-Tadema and Zoffany, watercolours by Turner and local artist Noel H. Leaver, a collection of Lancashire furniture, the Whalley Abbey vestments, natural history and local social and military history relating to the Towneley family. The Deer Pond in Towneley Park is a Local Nature Reserve.

== Traditions ==
According to folklore, the hall was haunted by a boggart. This spirit appeared once every seven years, just prior to the death of one of the residents. The boggart was linked to 'Sir John Towneley', who in life supposedly oppressed the poor of the district. According to writer Daniel Codd, there are later stories of a strange ghostly white apparition that appears by the River Calder.

== Gallery ==
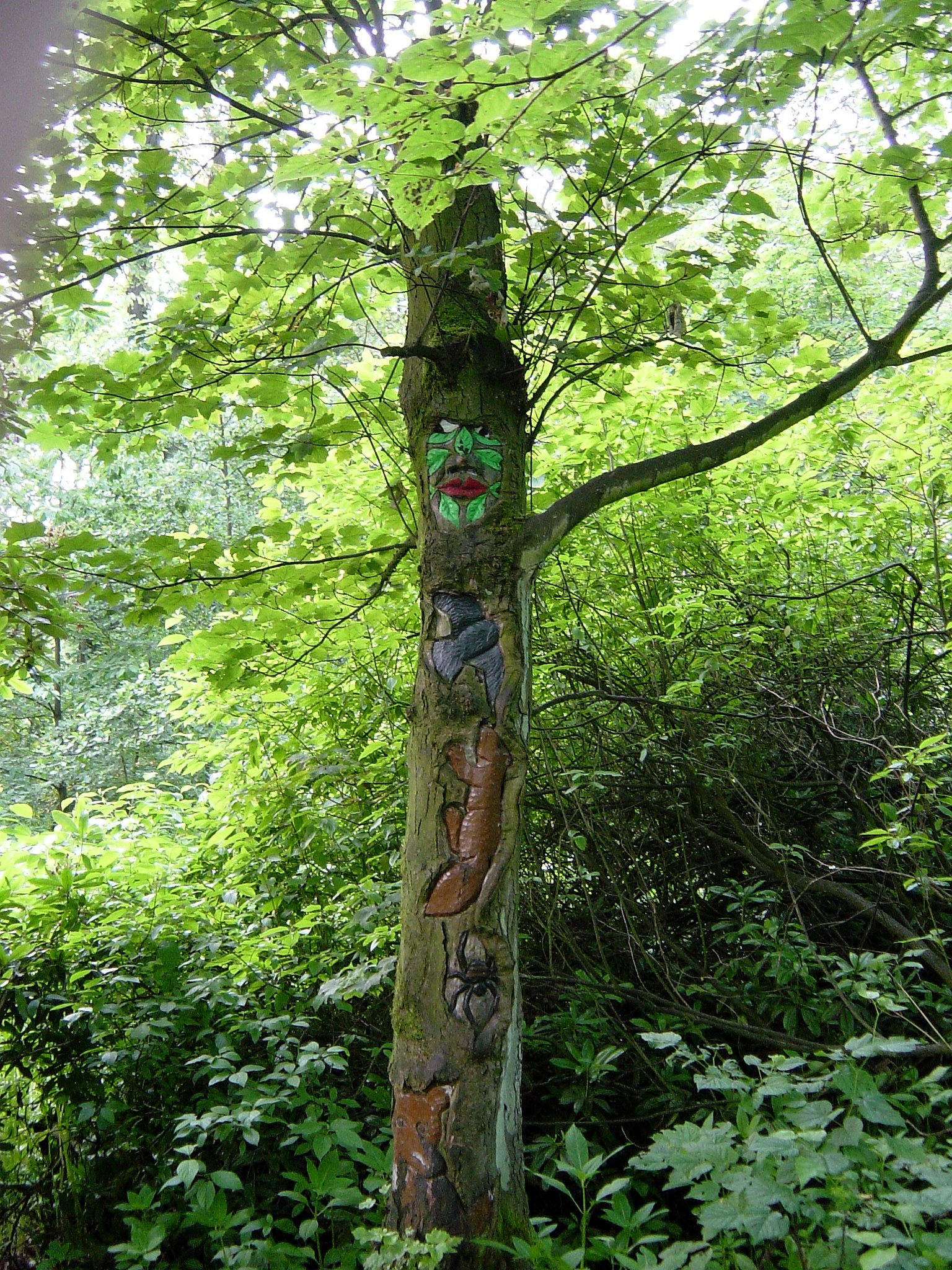
An example of the woodland sculptures

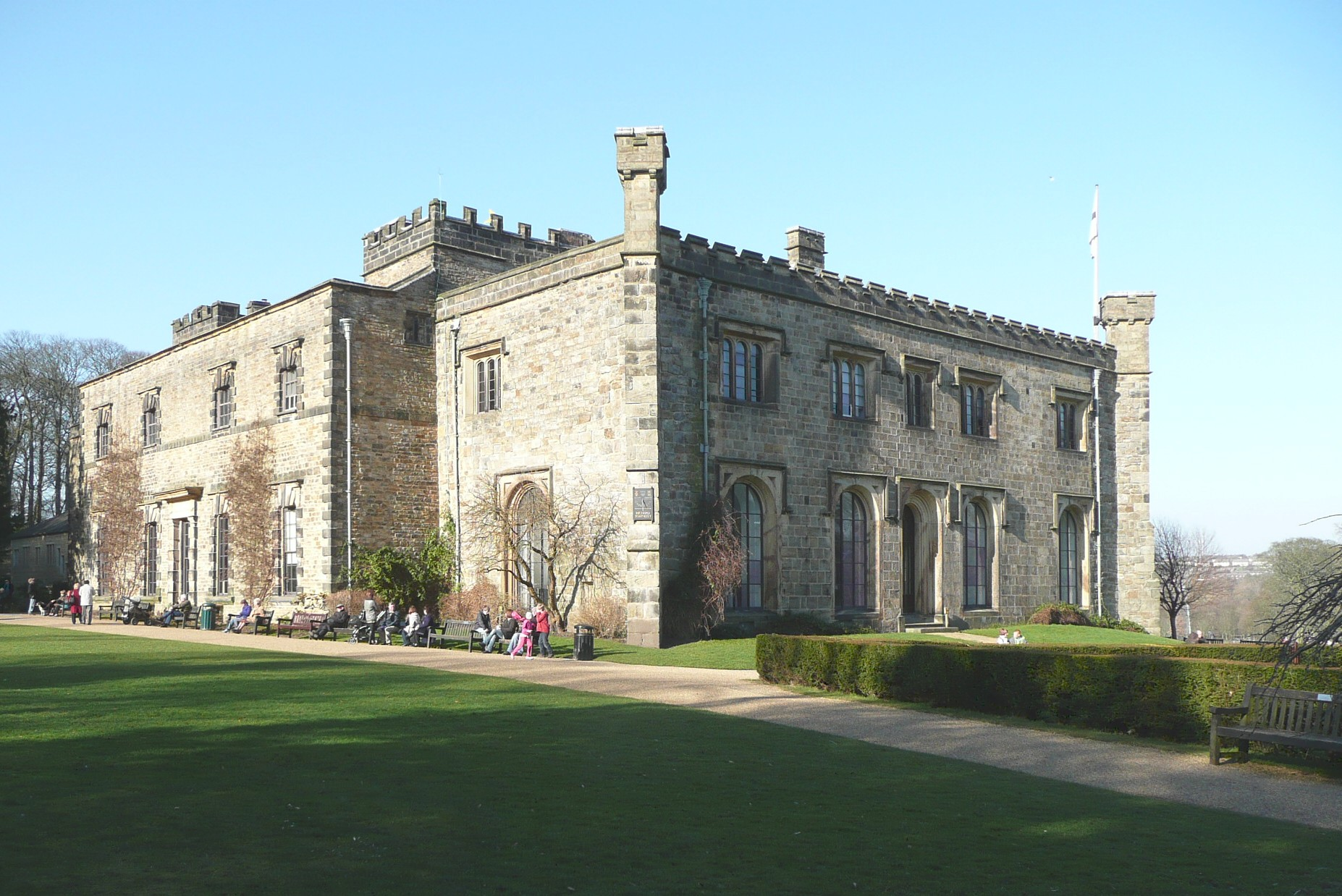
Hall from the southwest

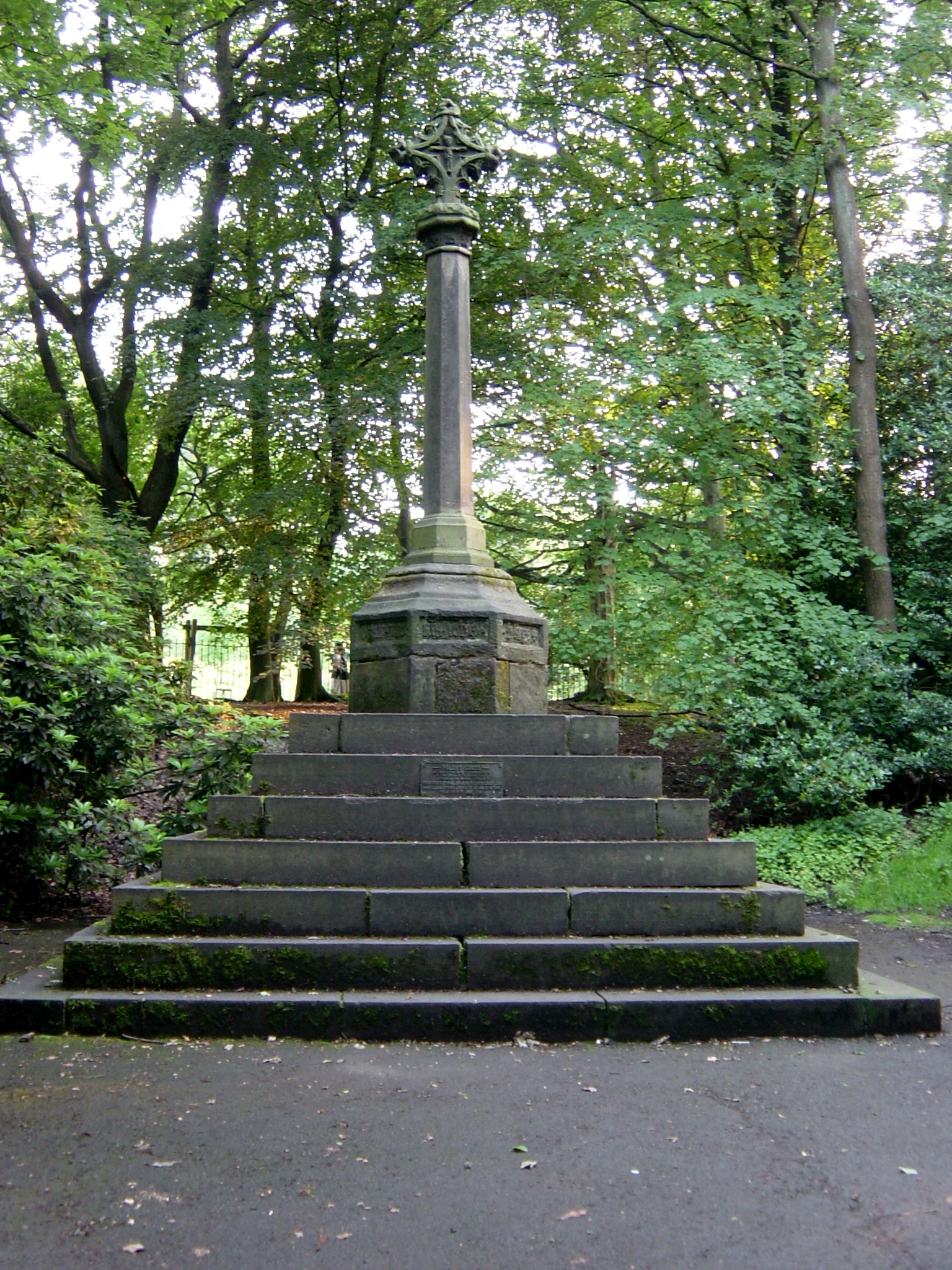
Foldys cross

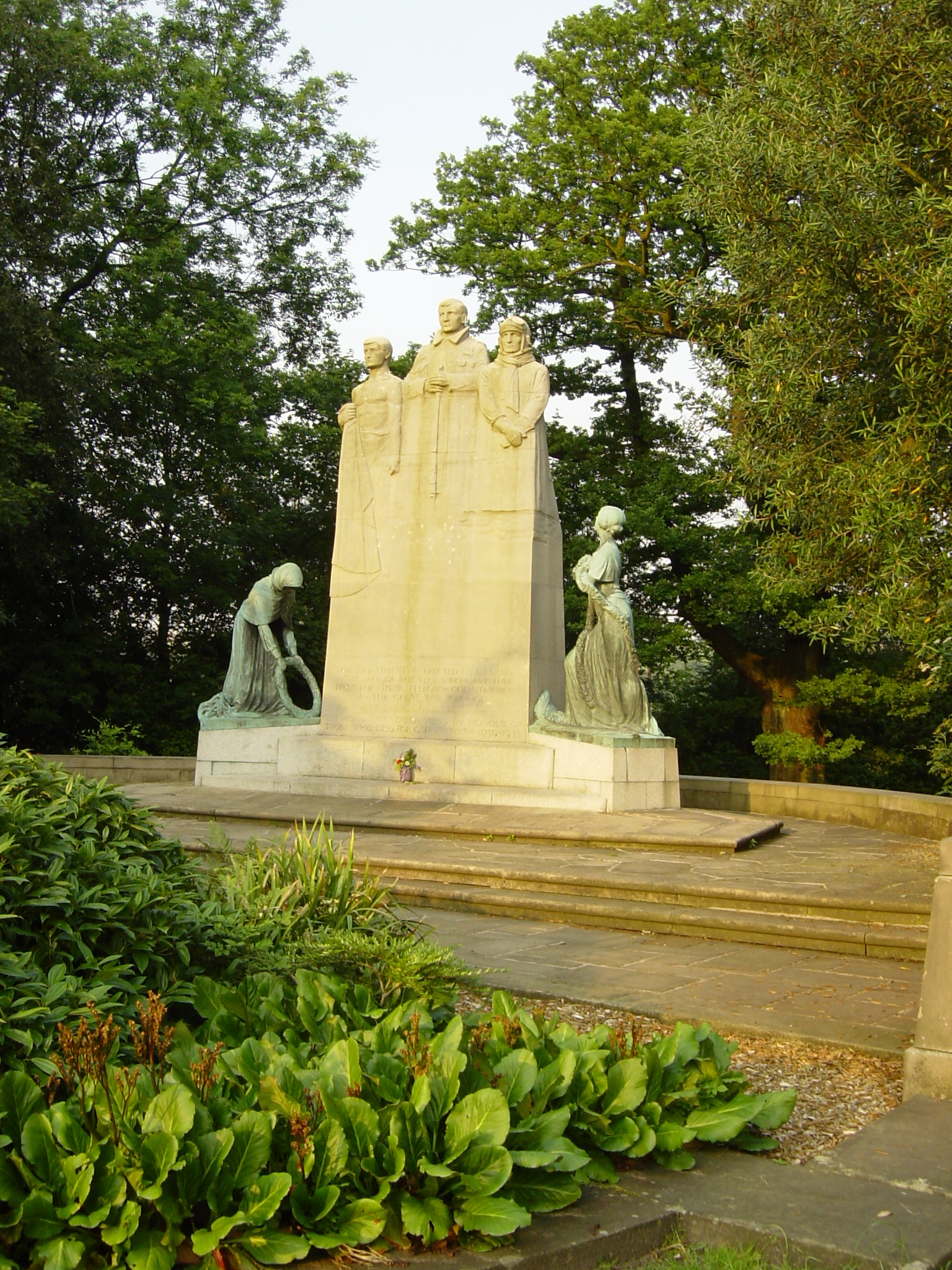
Towneley Cenotaph

== See also ==
- Grade I listed buildings in Lancashire
- Listed buildings in Burnley
- Richard Towneley
- Charles Townley
