= Textile History =

- Discipline: History of textiles and clothing
- Language: English

Publication details
- History: 1968–present
- Publisher: Maney Publishing for the Pasold Research Fund (UK)
- Frequency: Biannual

Standard abbreviations
- ISO 4: Text. Hist.

Indexing
- ISSN: 0040-4969 (print); 1743-2952 (web)
- OCLC no.: 225914018

Links
- Journal homepage; Online access at ingenta

Textile History is a peer-reviewed academic journal first published in 1968 and published by Maney Publishing on behalf of the Pasold Research Fund. It covers "aspects of the cultural and social history of apparel and textiles, as well as issues arising from the exhibition, preservation and interpretation of historic textiles or clothing".

== Abstracts and indices ==
The journal is indexed in other publications providing indexing and abstracting services including Arts and Humanities Citation Index, British Humanities Index and Historical Abstracts.
