= Hogan (surname) =

Hogan is an Irish surname, mostly from County Tipperary. It is the anglicised form of Gaelic Ó hÓgáin 'descendant of Ógán', a name meaning 'young warrior' (from Óg 'youth'). It may also be an anglicised form of Ó hEochagáin (Houghegan). Notable people with the surname include:

== A ==
- Allan Hogan (born 1943), Australian journalist
- Anni Hogan (born 1961), British musician and composer

== B ==
- Ben Hogan (1912–1997), American golfer
- Bill Hogan (politician), Canadian politician
- Bill Hogan III, American early 1960s ice hockey player
- Billy Hogan (1933–1994), American singer and songwriter
- Bosco Hogan (fl. late 20th century), Irish actor
- Brian Hogan (disambiguation)
- Brigid Hogan-O'Higgins (1932–2022), née Hogan, Irish politician

== C ==
- Cha Cha Hogan (1920–1986), American comedian, musician, songwriter and civil rights activist
- Chris Hogan (actor), American actor and comedian
- Chris Hogan (American football) (born 1988), American football player
- Chris Hogan (finance expert), American radio show host, author and personal finance expert
- Chuck Hogan, American novelist, screenwriter and television producer
- Corey Hogan (born 1981), Canadian politician

== D ==
- Daniel Hogan (general) (c. 1895–1940s), Irish lieutenant-general, Chief of Staff of the Defence Forces in Ireland
- Daniel Hogan (Irish politician) (1899–1980), Irish Fianna Fáil politician
- Daniel Hogan (sailor) (died 1818), American naval seaman
- Danny Hogan (1880–1928), American gangster
- Darrell Hogan, American football player
- David Hogan (composer) (1949–1996), American composer and choir director
- Dennis Hogan (sociologist), American 20th-21st century sociologist
- Desmond Hogan (born 1950), Irish writer
- Dick Hogan (1917–1995), American actor

== E ==
- Edith Hogan, American politician
- Edmond Hogan (1883–1964), Australian politician
- Edmund Hogan (1831–1917), Irish Jesuit scholar
- Edward Hogan (disambiguation)
- Erin Marie Hogan (born 1985), American actress
- Ernest Hogan (1865–1909), first African-American entertainer to produce and star in a Broadway show, The Oyster Man in 1907

== F ==
- Frank Hogan, American lawyer and politician

== G ==
- Gabriel Hogan (born 1973), Canadian actor
- Gary Hogan (born 1947), Irish football manager and former footballer

== H ==
- Happy Hogan (baseball) (1877–1915), American baseball player
- Hector Hogan (1931–1960), Australian Olympic sprinter
- Henry Hogan (1840–1916), United States Army sergeant, one of 19 soldiers awarded the Medal of Honor twice
- Hubertina D. Hogan (1924–2017), American chemist
- Hulk Hogan (1953–2025), American professional wrestler

== I ==
- Inez Hogan (1895–1973), American author and book illustrator

== J ==
- Jack Hogan (1929–2023), American actor
- James Hogan (disambiguation)
- Jimmy Hogan (1882–1974), British footballer
- João Hogan (1914–1988), Portuguese artist
- Joe Hogan (disambiguation)
- John Hogan (disambiguation)
- Jonathan Hogan (born 1951), American stage and television actor
- Joseph Lloyd Hogan (1916–2000), American Roman Catholic bishop

== K ==
- Kevin Hogan (disambiguation)
- Kiera Hogan (1994), American wrestler
- Krishawn Hogan (born 1995), American football player
- Krista Hogan, a conjoined twin

== L ==
- Larry Hogan (born 1956), governor of Maryland
- Lawrence Hogan (1928–2017), United States Representative, father of Larry Hogan
- Lester Hogan (1920–2008), American physicist
- Liam Hogan (born 1989), English footballer
- Liam Hogan (hurler) (1939–2014), Irish hurler
- Linda Hogan (ethicist) (born 1964), Irish ethicist, theologian and academic
- Linda Hogan (writer) (born 1947), academic, storyteller and environmentalist

== M ==
- Marc Hogan (born 1981), American journalist
- Marty Hogan (1869–1923), Anglo-American baseball player
- Michael Hogan (disambiguation)
- Mike Hogan (disambiguation)
- Moses Hogan (1957–2003), American composer and arranger of choral music

== N ==
- Noel Hogan (born 1971), Irish musician, songwriter and producer

== O ==
- Onya Hogan-Finlay (born 1977) Canadian artist

== P ==
- Paddy Hogan (born 1987), Irish hurler
- Patrick Hogan (disambiguation)
- Paul Hogan (disambiguation)
- Peter Hogan (fl. late 20th century), British comics writer
- Phil Hogan (born 1960), Irish politician

== R ==
- Raymond Hogan (1932–1995), Australian cricketer
- Rich Hogan (1913–1981), American screenwriter
- Robert Hogan (disambiguation)
- Ruth Hogan (born 1961), English novelist

== S ==
- Scott Hogan (born 1992), English footballer
- Sean Hogan (fl. late 20th century), Canadian singer-songwriter
- Seán Hogan (1901–1968), Irish Republican
- Shawn Hogan (born 1975), American entrepreneur
- Shanna Hogan (1982–2020), American writer
- Silas Hogan (1911–1994), American blues musician
- Simon Hogan (born 1988), Australian rules footballer
- Siobhan Fallon Hogan (born 1961), American actress
- Steve Hogan (1948–2018), American politician

== T ==
- Tatiana Hogan, a conjoined twin
- Thomas Hogan (disambiguation)
- Tom Hogan (born 1956), Australian cricketer

== V ==
- Virginia D. Hogan (1929–2004), American chemist

== W ==
- William Hogan (disambiguation)

== Y ==
- Yumi Hogan (born 1959), Korean–American artist, wife of former governor Larry Hogan

== Stage and ring names ==
- Brooke Hogan, stage name of American singer and reality television personality Brooke Bollea (born 1988), daughter of Hulk Hogan
- Horace Hogan, ring name of American professional wrestler Michael Bollea (born 1965), nephew of Hulk Hogan
- Hulk Hogan, ring name of American professional wrestler Terry Gene Bollea (1953–2025)
- Linda Hogan (TV personality) (born 1959), Linda Marie Claridge, American television personality and ex-wife of wrestler Hulk Hogan
- Nick Hogan, stage name of American reality television personality Nicholas Bollea (born 1990), son of Hulk Hogan

== See also ==
- Hogan (disambiguation)
- Hagan (surname)
- Hagan (disambiguation)
