= Hagen (disambiguation) =

Hagen is a city in the Ruhr Area, North Rhine-Westphalia, Germany.

Hagen may also refer to:

== People ==
- Hagen (surname)
- Hagen (given name)

== Places ==
=== Germany ===
- Hagen im Bremischen, a municipality in the district of Cuxhaven, Lower Saxony
- Hagen, Osnabrück (Hagen am Teutoburger Wald), a municipality in the district of Osnabrück, Lower Saxony
- Hagen, Schleswig-Holstein, a municipality in the district of Segeberg, Schleswig-Holstein
- Hagen (Bergen), a village administered by the Lower Saxon town of Bergen
- Hägen, a village and a former municipality in the district of Dithmarschen, Schleswig-Holstein

=== Papua New Guinea ===
- Mount Hagen, a major city in Papua New Guinea, simply referred to as Hagen in Tok Pisin
- Hagen Mountains (New Guinea)
- Mount Hagen (volcano), a volcanic mountain in the Western Highlands Province of Papua New Guinea

=== Canada ===
- Hagen, Saskatchewan, Canada, a hamlet
- Hagen Peak, British Columbia, Canada

=== Elsewhere ===
- Hagen, Moselle, France, a commune
- Hagen, Luxembourg, a small town in the commune of Steinfort
- Hagen Township, Clay County, Minnesota, United States
- Hagen, a former name, used until 1945, for Recław, Poland
  - Hagen (Pommern), former name, used until 1945, for the Recław railway station
- Hagen Mountains, Austria
- Hagen (Randen), a mountain in the canton of Schaffhausen, Switzerland
- Hagen, Ekenäs, a park in Ekenäs, Finland
- Hagen Fjord, Greenland
- Hagen (crater), a lunar crater on the far side of the Moon

== Arts and entertainment ==
- Hagen Quartet, an Austrian string quartet
- Hagen, Oomph!'s live performance bassist
- Hagen (TV series), a short-lived American television series
- Tom Hagen, a fictional character in The Godfather book and film series
- Mary Hagen, title character of the 1947 film That Hagen Girl, played by Shirley Temple
- Hagen (comics), a fictional character from DC Comics
- Hagen, a fictional Germanic gladiator played by Ralf Moeller in the 2000 film Gladiator
- Hagen (legend), a Burgundian warrior in tales about the Burgundian kingdom at Worms, also the villain in Wagner's opera Götterdämmerung

== Other uses ==
- University of Hagen, a public research university in Hagen, North Rhine-Westphalia, Germany
- Rolf C. Hagen Group, a company manufacturing various products related to pets
- Hagen & Sievertsen, a former packaging and printing business in Odense, Denmark
- SMS Hagen, an Imperial German coastal defence ship
- Hagen, a subdivision of the Chimbu–Wahgi languages of Papua New Guinea

== See also ==
- Hagen Site, Montana, United States, an archaeological site
- Hagan (disambiguation)
- Hagin, a surname
