= 1851 in Denmark =

- Decades: 1830s; 1840s; 1850s; 1860s; 1870s
- See also: Other events of 1851; List of years in Denmark

Events from the year 1851 in Denmark.

== Incumbents ==
- Monarch – Frederick VII
- Prime minister – Adam Wilhelm Moltke

== Events ==
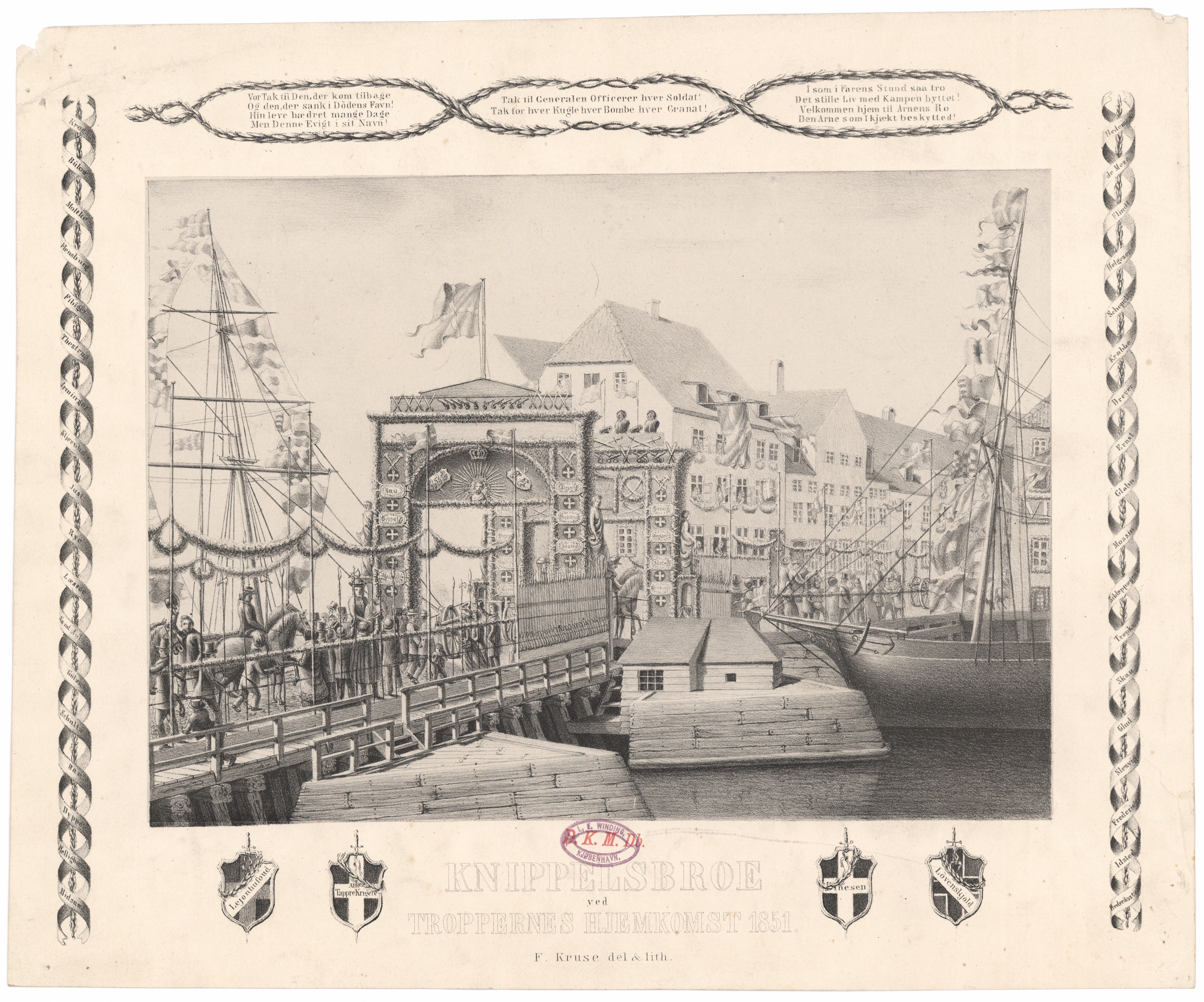
The Danish troops return to Copenhagen.

- February – Danish troops return to Copenhagen from the First Schleswig War.
- 1 May – Natalie Zahle launches a programme for the training of female private teachers, an initiative which will eventually develop into N. Zahle's School.
- 16 October – The first section of the Lübeck–Lüneburg railway is opened.

=== Undated ===
- Hagen & Sievertsen is founded in Odense.

== Culture ==
=== Art ===
- 31 March – The Charlottenborg Spring Exhibition opens.
  - Wilhelm Marstrand's painting of Church-Goers Arriving by Boat at the Parish Church of Leksand on Siljan Lake is part of the exhibition.

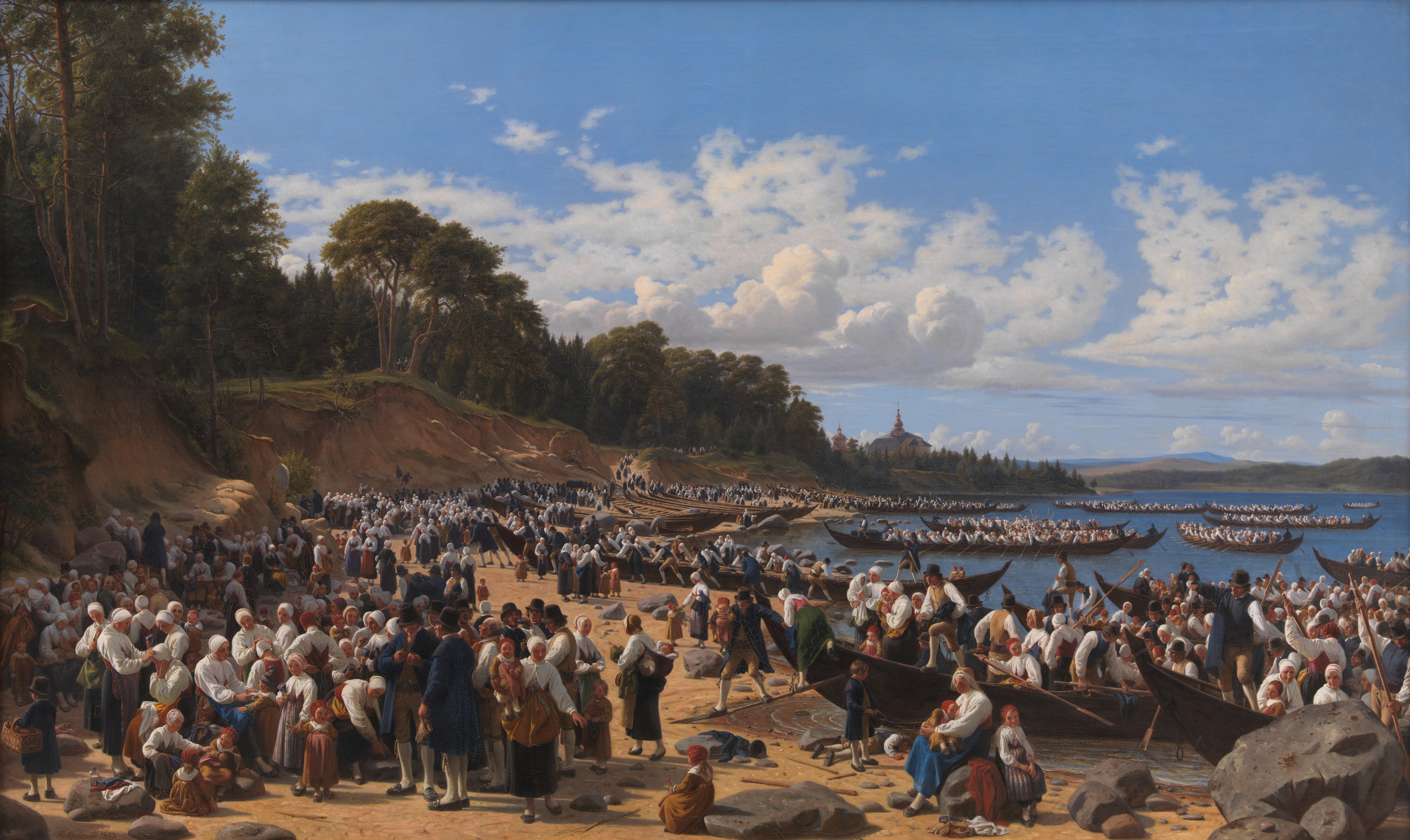
Wilhelm Marstrand: Church-Goers Arriving by Boat at the Parish Church of Leksand on Siljan Lake, Danish National Gallery.

== Births ==
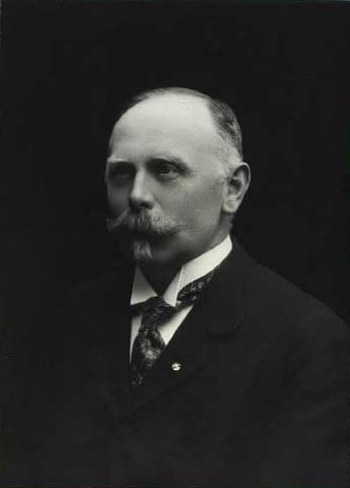
Heinrich Wenck.

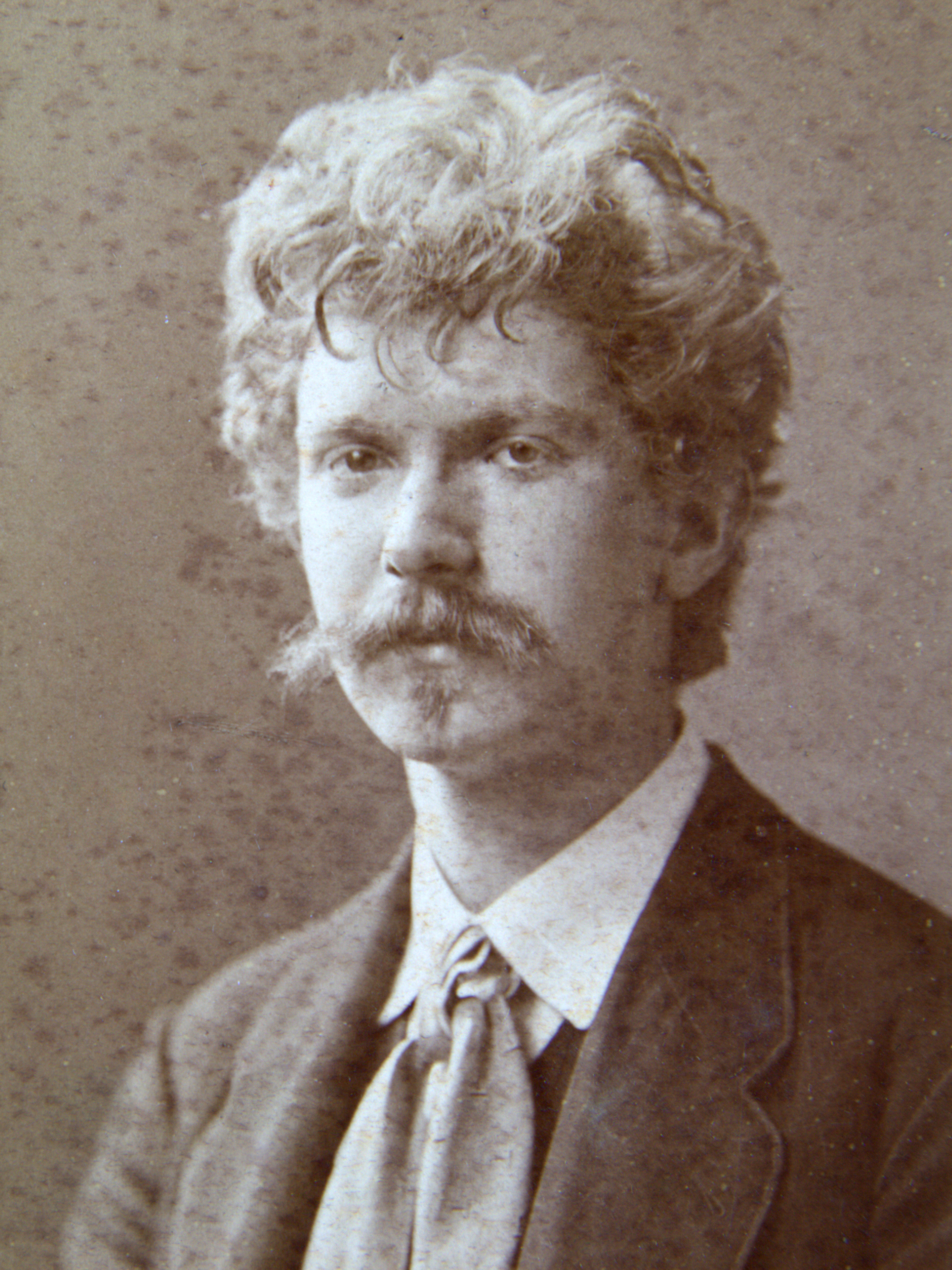
Peder Severin Krøyer.

=== January–March ===
- 3 January – Viggo Johansen, painter (died 1935)
- 5 January – Johanne Bindesbøll, textile artist (died 1934)
- 9 February – Viggo Dorph-Petersen, architect (died 1837 in France)
- 26 February – Peter Kristian Prytz, physicist (died 1929)
- 10 March – Heinrich Wenck, architect (died 1936)

=== July–September ===
- 23 July – Peder Severin Krøyer, painter (died 1909)
- 16 August – Harald Jerichau, painter (died 1878)

=== October–December ===
- 21 November – Carl Locher, painter (died 1915)
- 22 November – Karl Jensen, painter (died 1933)

== Deaths ==
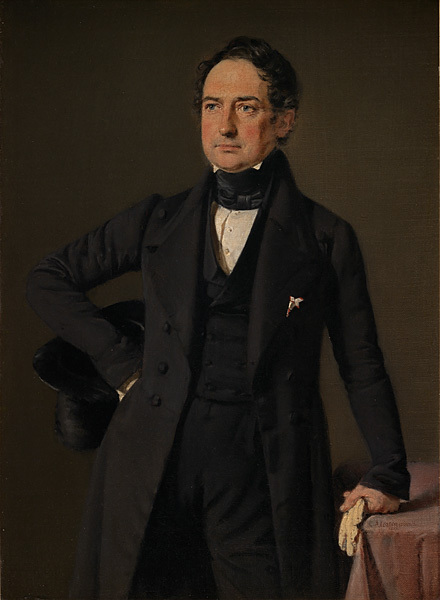
Ole Jørgen Rawert.

- 9 March – Hans Christian Ørsted, physicist and chemist, discoverer of electromagnetism (born 1777)
- 11 July – Ole Jørgen Rawert, government official and topographic painter (born 1786)
- 25 August – Johan Christian Drewsen, businessman and agronomist (born 1777)
- 20 December – Gebhard Moltke, nobleman, landowner and civil servant (born 1764).
- 27 December – Sophie Thalbitzer, memorist (born 1774)
