= John Hogan =

John Hogan may refer to:

== Arts and entertainment ==
- John Hogan (sculptor) (1800–1858), Irish sculptor, creator of The Dead Christ
- John Forbes Hogan (1894–1967), American architect
- John Hogan (singer) (born 1953), Irish singer

== Law and politics ==
- John Hogan (North Carolina planter) (1740–1810), American Revolutionary War soldier and politician
- John Hogan (Missouri politician) (1805–1892), Irish-American preacher and politician
- John Sheridan Hogan (c.1815–1859), Irish journalist, lawyer and political figure in Canada West
- John W. Hogan (1853–1926), American associate appellate judge and lawyer
- John Hogan (Newfoundland and Labrador politician) (born 1978), Canadian politician

== Religion ==
- John Baptist Hogan (1829–1901), Irish-French Catholic theologian and educator
- John Joseph Hogan (1829–1913), American Roman Catholic bishop
- John F. Hogan (1858–1918), Irish priest and educator

== Science and medicine ==
- John Vincent Lawless Hogan (1890–1960), American electrical engineer and radio technology pioneer
- J. Paul Hogan (1919–2012), American chemist, inventor of polyethylene
- John D. Hogan (born 1939), American psychologist and author
- John Philip Hogan (1881–1961), American civil engineer

== Others ==
- John Hogan (rugby) (1881–1945), New Zealand rugby league and rugby union footballer
- John Hogan (VC) (1884–1943), English First World War soldier and recipient of the Victoria Cross
- John Hogan (footballer) (born 1941), Australian rules footballer
- John Hogan (motorsport executive) (1943–2021), Australian advertising boss
- John Hogan (mathematician) (born 1954), British academic
- John Hogan (businessman) (born before 1970), American corporate executive

== See also ==
- Jack Hogan (1929–2023), American actor
- Jonathan Hogan (born 1951), American actor
