= Hogan (disambiguation) =

A hogan is a Navajo dwelling.

Hogan may also refer to:

== People ==
- Hogan (surname)
- Hogan (given name)

== Places ==
=== United States ===
- Hogan, Missouri, United States, an unincorporated community
- Hogan Township, Pope County, Arkansas
- Hogan Township, Dearborn County, Indiana
- Hogan Creek, Indiana

=== Elsewhere ===
- Hogan Island, in southeastern Australia, largest of Hogan's Group
- Hogan River, a tributary of the Boisvert River in Quebec, Canada

== Other uses ==
- Hogan Cup, an Irish football championship trophy
- Hogan's Fountain Pavilion
- Hogan Racing, an American car racing team
- USS Hogan (DD-178) (1919–1945), a United States Navy destroyer
- Hogan Hall, primarily a dormitory of Columbia University
- Hogan Preparatory Academy, a charter high school in Kansas City, Missouri
- Colonel Robert Hogan, main character in Hogan's Heroes, an American TV series
- Hogan (band), an Irish pop rock band
- Hogan Wings, a model aircraft brand owned by Herpa Wings
- Hogan (brand), a shoe trademark made by Tod's

== See also ==
- Hogan Gang, a Prohibition-era criminal organization based in St. Louis, Missouri
- Happy Hogan (disambiguation)
