= Hogan (given name) =

Hogan is the given name or nickname of:

== Given name ==
- Hogan Bassey (1932-1998), Nigeria's first world boxing champion
- Hogan Ephraim (born 1988), English footballer
- Hogan Gidley (born 1976), American politician, White House Deputy Press Secretary under Trump
- Hogan Hatten (born 2000), American football player
- Hogan Jimoh (born 1955), Nigerian boxer of the 1970s and '80s
- Hogan McLaughlin (born 1989), American fashion designer, artist, dancer and musician

== Nickname ==
- Hogan Sheffer (born 1958), American television writer
