= Hagan =

Hagan may refer to:

== Places ==
=== Iran ===
- Hagan, Iran, a village in Hamadan Province

=== Norway ===
- Hagan, a village in Harstad
- Hagan, a village in Akershus

=== United States ===
- Hagan, Georgia, a city
- Hagan, Minnesota, an unincorporated community
- Hagan, New Mexico, a ghost town
- Hagan, Virginia, an unincorporated community
- Hagan Mountain, Washington state

== People ==
- Hagan (surname)
- Hagan (given name)

== Sports facilities ==
- Hagan Arena, Philadelphia, Pennsylvania, United States, the basketball arena of St. Joseph's University
- Hagan Park, Coagh, Northern Ireland, home of football club Coagh United

== See also ==
- Hagen (disambiguation)
- O'Hagan, an Irish surname
