= Lady from Louisiana =

1941 film directed by Bernard Vorhaus

- Film poster
- Directed by: Bernard Vorhaus
- Screenplay by: Vera Caspary; Michael Hogan; Guy Endore
- Story by: Edward James; Francis Edward Faragoh
- Produced by: Bernard Vorhaus
- Starring: John Wayne; Ona Munson; Ray Middleton; Henry Stephenson; Helen Westley
- Cinematography: Jack A. Marta
- Edited by: Edward Mann
- Music by: Mort Glickman
- Production company: Republic Pictures
- Distributed by: Republic Pictures
- Release date: April 22, 1941
- Running time: 83 minutes
- Country: United States
- Language: English

Lady from Louisiana is a 1941 American western drama film directed by Bernard Vorhaus and starring John Wayne, Ona Munson and Ray Middleton. It was produced and distributed by Republic Pictures. Vera Caspary was amongst the film's screenwriters.

The Louisiana State Lottery Company organizes a lottery in 1890s New Orleans, with lottery funds used to finance the local hospitals. However, a company official is the secret head of a protection racket which systematically murders the lottery winners. The protection racket has placed informers in the office of the State Attorney, and has bribed city officials and judges. As a new state attorney tries to combat rampant corruption, the city floods due to torrential rains.

== Plot ==
Yankee lawyer John Reynolds and Southern Belle Julie Mirbeau meet and fall in love on a riverboat going to New Orleans in the Gay Nineties. Upon arrival, they are met by Julie's father who runs the popular Louisiana State Lottery Company and Reynold's Aunt Blanche who is a key figure in the anti-lottery forces hoping Reynolds, as State's Attorney, will end the lottery.

Reynolds is invited to the Mirbeau mansion, where Julie and her father explain that not only are the people of New Orleans fun-loving gamblers, but the lottery funds many charitable institutions such as hospitals and levees for the river.

Unknown to General Mirbeau is his assistant Blackie's protection rackets and murders of lottery winners through his army of thugs led by Cuffy Brown. The lottery forces also have information sources in the State's Attorney's office that reveals every move Reynolds has planned to raid illegal activities as well as corrupting judges and other officials through their brothels.

The battle between the two forces escalates, leading to a climax of lightning striking and destroying a courthouse where a trial is going on and a break in the levees during torrential rains that flood the city.

== Cast ==
- John Wayne as John Reynolds
- Ona Munson as Julie Mirbeau
- Ray Middleton as Blackburn "Blackie" Williams
- Henry Stephenson as General Anatole Mirbeau
- Helen Westley as Blanche Brunot
- Jack Pennick as Cuffy Brown
- Dorothy Dandridge as Felice
- Shimen Ruskin as Gaston
- Jacqueline Dalya as Pearl
- Paul Scardon as Judge Wilson
- James H. McNamara as Senator Cassidy (as Major James H. McNamara)
- James C. Morton as Littlefield
- Maurice Costello as Edwards
- Heinie Conklin as Lottery Winner (uncredited)

== Production ==
Republic Pictures spared no expense in making the film, with large numbers of costumed extras and recreations of Mardi Gras. The studio's high standard of action scenes and special effects miniatures come to the fore in the fight scenes and flood climax. The film mixes the romance and action with a comedic touch, with Wayne performing a light, Walking Tall type scenario. A 1941 Time magazine review likens Wayne's character to crusading New York Prosecutor and District Attorney Thomas E. Dewey. The reviewer wrote that the film "records the triumph of a 19th-Century Thomas E. Dewey (John Wayne) over one of Dewey's favorite rackets—the lottery."

== See also ==
- John Wayne filmography

== Bibliography ==
- Fetrow, Alan G. Feature Films, 1940-1949: a United States Filmography. McFarland, 1994.
- Roberts, Randy. John Wayne: American. University of Nebraska Press, 1997.
