= Edward Hogan =

Edward Hogan may refer to:

- Edward Hogan (Missouri politician) (1885–1963), American politician
- Edward Hogan (New York politician) (1834–1905), American politician
- Edward Hogan (writer) (born 1980), British novelist
- Edward Hogan, member of Egan's Rats
- Edward J. Hogan (1897–1976), American track and field athlete
- Ed Hogan (ice hockey) (1882–1953), Canadian ice hockey player

== See also ==
- Edmond Hogan (1883–1964), Australian politician
- Edmund Hogan (1831–1917), Irish Jesuit scholar
- Eddie Hogan (1860–1932), American baseball player
