= Senator Hogin =

Senator Hogin may refer to:

- James Latimer Hogin (1801–1876), Iowa State Senate
- John Chrisfield Hogin (1823–1886), Iowa State Senate

== See also ==
- Senator Hogan (disambiguation)
