= James Hogan =

James, Jim, or Jimmy Hogan may refer to:

== Arts and entertainment ==
- James Humphries Hogan (1883–1948), English stained glass designer
- James P. Hogan (director) (1890–1943), American filmmaker
- James P. Hogan (writer) (1941–2010), British science fiction author

== Law and politics ==
- James Francis Hogan (1855–1924), Irish politician; MP for Mid Tipperary
- James J. Hogan (1837–1914), American politician
- James Thomas Hogan (1874–1953), New Zealand politician
- James Hogan (Saskatchewan politician) (1872–1935), Canadian politician

== Sports ==
- James Hogan (American football) (1876–1910), Irish-American college football player
- Jim Hogan (Kilkenny hurler) (1928–2010), Irish hurler
- Jim Hogan (Limerick hurler) (1937–2016), Irish hurler
- Jim Hogan (athlete) (1933–2015), Irish distance runner
- Jimmy Hogan (1882–1974), British footballer

== Others ==
- James Hogan (trade unionist) (fl. 1890s), American trade unionist
- James John Hogan (1911–2005), American Roman Catholic bishop
- James Hogan (businessman) (born 1956), Australian airline executive
- James Hogan (historian) (1898–1963), Irish revolutionary and historian

== See also ==
- Hogan (disambiguation)
