= Dennis Hogan =

Dennis Hogan may refer to:

- Dennis Hogan (sociologist) (fl. 1970s–2020s), American sociologist
- Dennis Hogan (boxer) (born 1985), Irish boxer
