= Finian Monahan =

Irish priest (1924–2010)

Finian Monahan (1 January 1924 – 5 June 2010) was an Irish Catholic priest. He was the Superior General of the Discalced Carmelite Order from 1973 to 1979.

He was born James Monahan in Kilrickle, near Loughrea, County Galway on 1 January 1924. Monahan was ordained to the priesthood on 23 April 1950. He died on 5 June 2010. His funeral was held in the Abbey, Loughrea, where he is buried in the adjoining cemetery.
