= Kilreekill =

Civil parish in County Galway, Ireland

Coordinates: 53.230°N 8.453°W

Kilrickle or Kilreekill (Irish: Cill Rícill) is a civil parish and small village in County Galway, Ireland. It lies within an electoral division of the same name and within the historical barony of Leitrim. The area is served by Citylink bus services from Galway City via Loughrea.

== Name ==
The Irish place name Cill Rícill (meaning "church of Richill") is anglicised as 'Kilrickle' and 'Kilreekill'. It is associated with Richill – a local woman who, according to folklore, was a 5th-century contemporary of Saint Patrick and founded a church in the area.

== History ==
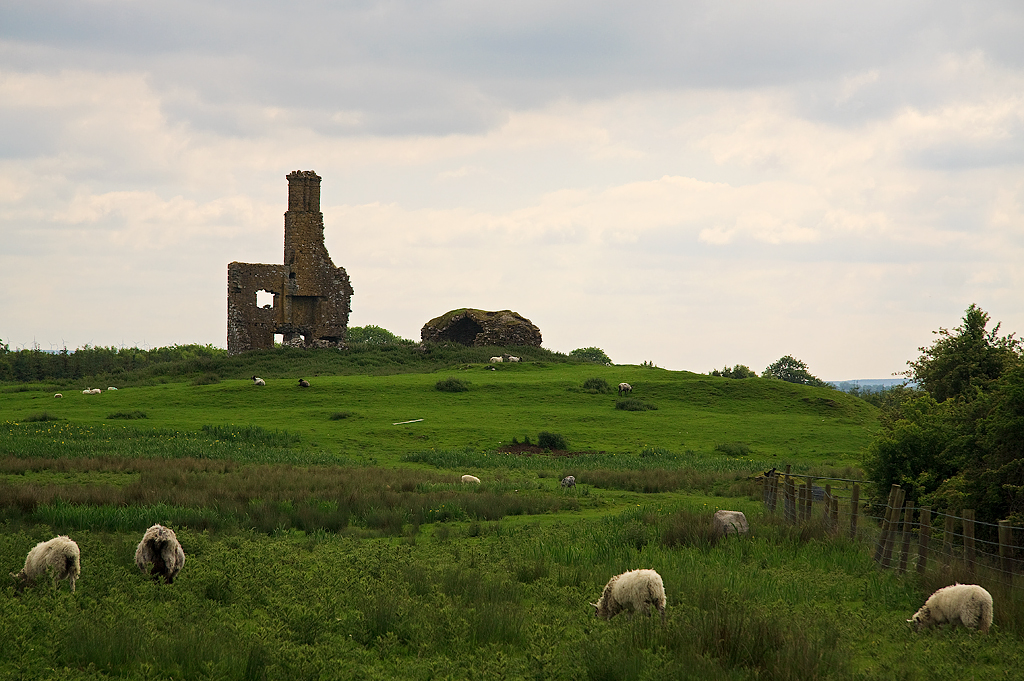
Remains of fortified house in Wallscourt

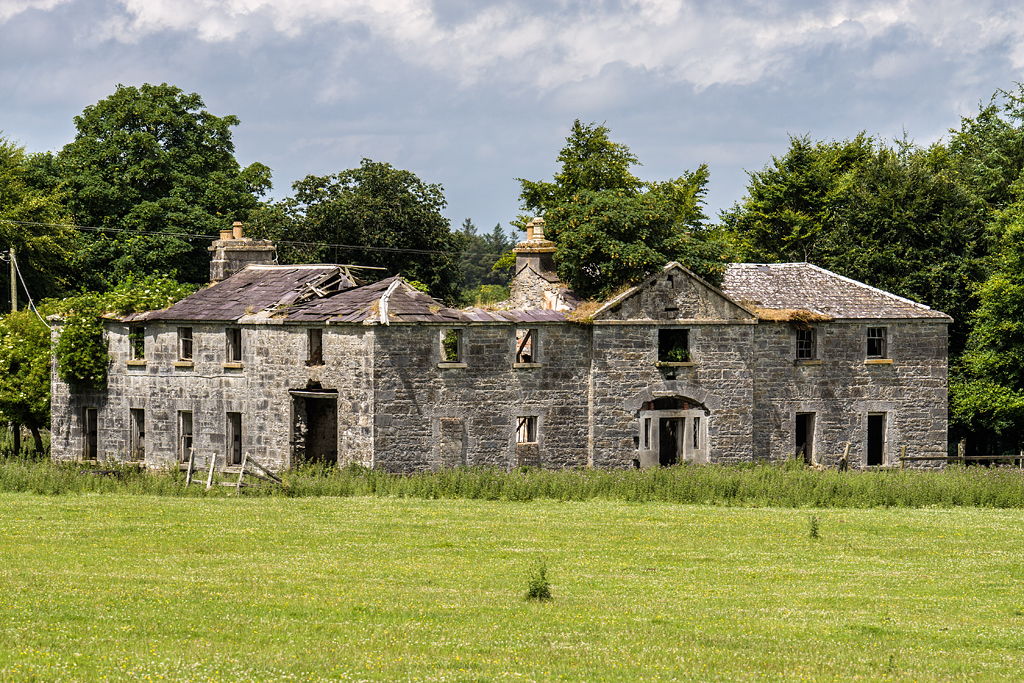
Dartfield House ruins

Evidence of ancient settlement in the area includes a number of ringfort, souterrain and holy well sites in the townlands of Lecarrownagappoge, Dartfield and Wallscourt. The remains of a fortified house lie in Wallscourt townland, and the ruins of Dartfield House (a country house originally built c. 1820) are in Dartfield.

The local Catholic church, which is in the townland of Wallscourt, was built in 1839. Dedicated to Our Lady of Lourdes, it is within the ecclesiastical parish of Cappatagle and Kilrickle in the Roman Catholic Diocese of Clonfert.

The local national (primary) school, Kilrickle National School, was built in 1922. It had an enrollment of 56 pupils in 2024.

In 2023, the village was linked to the mainline water system for the first time in 50 years.

== People ==
- Jim Fahy (1946–2022), journalist and broadcaster with RTÉ
- James Hogan (1898–1963), historian and revolutionary, was born in Kilrickle (Kilreekil) in 1898
- Patrick Hogan (1891–1936), politician and brother of James Hogan, was also born in the parish.
- Finian Monahan (1924–2010), Catholic priest and former head of the Discalced Carmelite Order
- Niamh Regan (born 1984), folk singer
