= Senator Hogan =

Senator Hogan may refer to:

- Charles V. Hogan (1897–1971), Massachusetts State Senate
- Daniel Hogan (Illinois politician) (1849–1912), Illinois State Senate
- Daniel Hogan (Irish politician) (1899–1980), Senate of Ireland
- Edward Hogan (Missouri politician) (1885–1963), Missouri State Senate
- Edward Hogan (New York politician) (1834–1905), New York State Senate
- John Hogan (North Carolina planter) (1740–1810), North Carolina State Senate
- Kathy Hogan (born 1948), North Dakota State Senate
- Patrick J. Hogan (Maryland politician) (born 1962), Maryland State Senate
- Thomas S. Hogan (1869–1957), Montana State Senate

== See also ==
- Senator Hogin (disambiguation)
