= Michael Hogan =

Michael Hogan may refer to:

== The arts ==
- Michael Hogan (Canadian actor) (born 1949), main work includes Battlestar Galactica
- Michael Hogan (poet) (1828–1899), Irish poet
- Michael Hogan (screenwriter) (1893–1977), British actor and screenwriter, films include The Iron Stair and King Solomon's Mines
- Michael Hogan (writer) (born 1943), American writer and poet
- Michael Hogan, American actor and assistant director, known for The Resident and The Kill Point

== Jurists ==
- Sir Michael Joseph Hogan (1908–1986), chief justice of Hong Kong and president of the Court of Appeal of the Bahamas
- Michael Robert Hogan (born 1946), American judge

== Politicians ==
- Michael Hogan (Irish politician) (1853–1935), member of parliament for North Tipperary (1906–1910)
- Michael Hogan (Canadian politician) (1872–1943), Canadian politician
- Michael J. Hogan (1871–1940), American politician
- Michael P. Hogan, American politician

== Sportspeople ==
- Michael Hogan (cricketer) (born 1981), Australian cricketer
- Michael Hogan (Gaelic footballer) (1896–1920), footballer shot dead on Bloody Sunday

== Other ==
- Michael Hogan (academic) (born 1943), American scholar; former president of the University of Illinois
- Michael Hogan (shipowner) (1766–1833), involved in early settlement of Australia

== Fictional ==
- Michael Hogan, a lead character on the American sitcom The Hogan Family, played by actor Josh Taylor
- Michael Hogan (fictional character), a fictional British intelligence officer in the Sharpe series of novels by Bernard Cornwell

== See also ==
- Mike Hogan (disambiguation)
