= Patrick Hogan =

Patrick or Pat Hogan may refer to:

== Law and politics ==
- Patrick Hogan (Australian politician) (1835–1918), New South Wales politician
- Patrick Hogan (Labour Party politician) (1885–1969), Irish Labour party politician, represented Clare
- Patrick Hogan (Cumann na nGaedheal politician) (1891–1936), Irish Cumann na nGaedhael/Fine Gael politician, represented Galway
- Patrick Hogan (Farmers' Party politician) (fl. 1920s), Irish Farmers Party politician, represented Limerick in the 1920s
- Patrick Hogan (Tipperary politician) (1907–1972), Irish Fine Gael politician, represented Tipperary South
- Patrick J. Hogan (Maryland politician) (born 1962), American politician in the Maryland Senate
- Patrick N. Hogan (born 1979), American politician in the Maryland House of Delegates

== Sports ==
- Pat Hogan (footballer) (1930–2017), Australian rules footballer
- Patrick Hogan (racehorse breeder) (1939–2023), New Zealand horse breeder and horse racer
- Patrick Hogan (soccer) (born 1997), American soccer player

== Others ==
- Pat Hogan (1920–1966), American actor
- Patrick Hogan (biologist), American scientist

== See also ==
- Paddy Hogan (born 1987), Irish hurler for Kilkenny
