= Kevin Hogan (disambiguation) =

Kevin Hogan is an American football player.

Kevin Hogan may also refer to:

- Kevin Hogan (footballer, born 1932) (1932–2001), Australian rules footballer for Richmond
- Kevin Hogan (footballer, born 1934) (1934–2019), Australian rules footballer for South Melbourne and sports broadcaster
- Kevin Hogan (politician) (born 1963), Australian National Party politician
- Kevin Hogan (rugby league), Australian rugby league player
