= Kevin Hogan (footballer, born 1932) =

Australian rules footballer (1932–2001)

Personal information
- Full name: Kevin Hogan
- Born: 7 December 1932
- Died: 10 August 2001 (aged 68)
- Original teams: St Patrick's College, Ballarat
- Height: 170 cm (5 ft 7 in)
- Weight: 67 kg (148 lb)

Playing career^{1}
Years	Club	Games (Goals)
1952–53	Richmond	15 (10)
- ^{1} Playing statistics correct to the end of 1953.

Kevin Hogan (7 December 1932 – 10 August 2001) was an Australian rules footballer who played with Richmond in the Victorian Football League (VFL).

Hogan coached Airport West Football Club in 1955.
