= Hogan Creek =

Stream in Indiana, U.S.

Coordinates: 39.0576°N 84.8978°W

Hogan Creek is a stream in the U.S. state of Indiana. It is a tributary to the Ohio River.

Hogan Creek was named after the two Hogan brothers, pioneer settlers who were both killed by Indians.
