= James Hogan (historian) =

20th-century Irish historian

- Born: 16 October 1898; Kilrickle, near Loughrea, County Galway
- Died: 24 October 1963 (aged 65)
- Spouse: Mary O'Neill (m. 1935–1963)
- Children: 6
- Relatives: Patrick Hogan (brother)
- Military career
- Branch: Irish Volunteers; Irish Republican Army; National Army
- Rank: Major-General (National Army)
- Conflicts: War of Irish Independence; Irish Civil War

Academic background
- Education: University College Dublin
- Thesis: The separatist movement in Irish history during the period 1640–1691 (1920)

Academic work
- Notable students: Margaret MacCurtain; Donnchadh Ó Corráin; Eoghan Harris; Michael O’Leary
- Main interests: early modern Irish History, medieval Irish history, modern Political Thought
- Notable works: Election and Representation (1945)

James Hogan (16 October 1898 – 24 October 1963) was an Irish revolutionary, historian, and political scientist. Educated at Clongowes Wood College and University College Dublin, Hogan joined the Dublin Brigade of the Irish Volunteers in 1915 and later fought in the War of Irish Independence while also becoming a figure in the academic world, securing a chair of history at University College Cork. He supported the Anglo-Irish Treaty and served in military roles during the Irish Civil War before returning to academia. A founding member of the Irish Manuscripts Commission, Hogan was also active in politics, briefly aligning with the Blueshirts and Fine Gael, though he later distanced himself from party politics. His scholarly work spanned early modern and medieval Irish history, as well as modern political thought, and he remained a prominent advocate for high academic standards throughout his career.

== Early life ==
James Hogan was born 16 October 1898 at Cloonmain, Kilrickle, near Loughrea, County Galway, the seventh child among four sons and five daughters of Brigid Hogan (née Glennon) and Michael F. Hogan, a farmer and chief inspector with the Estates Commission. James Hogan's older brother, Patrick Hogan, would become Minister for Agriculture in the Cumann na nGaedheal government. Their sister Nora was a founding member of the Missionary Sisters of St. Columban in 1922. Hogan grew up in a family that encouraged intellectualism and once remarked that, amongst his own people, "it was as natural to be reading as to be eating one's dinner".

Hogan was educated by the Jesuits in Clongowes Wood College in County Kildare between 1910 and 1915. One of three students studying Irish, he declined to be recruited into the Officers Training Corps of the British Army. Matriculating for the National University of Ireland (NUI) in 1915, Hogan enrolled as a student of history and law in University College Dublin. He was active in the Literary and Historical Society and An Cumann Gaedhlach, an Irish language society. Among his teachers were Thomas MacDonagh for English, Douglas Hyde for Irish, John Marcus O'Sullivan and Mary Hayden for history, and James Murnaghan for jurisprudence and Roman law.

== Irish revolutionary ==
Hogan joined the 3rd Battalion of the Dublin Brigade of the Irish Volunteers in 1915 as well as the secret organisation the Irish Republican Brotherhood which controlled the Volunteers from the inside. While on holidays in County Clare in 1916, he learned of the Easter Rising occurring in Dublin and noted its unpopularity in the immediate aftermath. In 1918 Hogan sat his BA, taking first-class honours and first place in history, and studied for his master's degree in history, c. 1919. Hogan's career was interrupted by the outbreak of the War of Irish Independence and he attached himself to the East Clare flying column, taking a leading part in military engagements in counties Clare, Galway, and Limerick.

Though Hogan was absent from formal studies between 1920 and 1922, he finished his MA thesis, "The separatist movement in Irish history during the period 1640–1691", and had it published in three articles in Studies (1920). His first book, Ireland in the European System (1500–1557) was published by Longman & Green in the same year. His application for the chair of history at University College Cork in April 1920 was successful. President P. J. Merriman granted him leave of absence in October 1922 "for work of national importance". Hogan did not take up his professorial duties until the second semester of 1924.

Hogan supported the Anglo-Irish Treaty and served as an adviser to Arthur Griffith in the inter-government negotiations held in London May–June 1922. He witnessed the outbreak of hostilities in the Irish Civil War when they began at the Four Courts in Dublin in June 1922 (Battle of Dublin) and was forced to postpone his retirement from his post as assistant adjutant-general at General Headquarters at Beggar's Bush. During the Civil War Hogan held the position of Director of Intelligence and the rank of Major-General.

Michael Collins, a close friend of Hogan's, involved him in negotiations concerning north-east Ulster which were only interrupted by Collins's death on 22 August 1922. Until the end of 1922 Hogan occupied the post of general officer in charge of inspection at Army Headquarters in Dublin. The following year he was prevailed upon to remain on as a director of intelligence and reorganised that section. In August 1923 he submitted a report to General Seán MacMahon and was granted his request for demobilisation. He thereafter returned to academic activities.

== Return to Academics ==
In 1927 Hogan was elected to Royal Irish Academy.

Hogan viewed the destruction of the Public Records archives in the Four Courts as a national disaster. With Eoin MacNeill and Dr Timothy Corcoran, he persuaded the government in 1928 to establish a state agency for the recovery and publication of Ireland's written historical records, the Irish Manuscripts Commission. Hogan became its most influential and active member, serving as general editor of Analecta Hibernica from 1930 until 1963. In 1929 he advised the Minister for Defence on collections of army documents from 1780 to 1921, and later served on the advisory committee for the Bureau of Military History, where written and spoken testimony from survivors of the War of Independence and the Civil War were collected.

Hogan served for several decades on the senate of the NUI, consistently advocating an impartial appointment system for academic posts and high standards in the awarding of postgraduate degrees.

== Brief involvement in politics ==
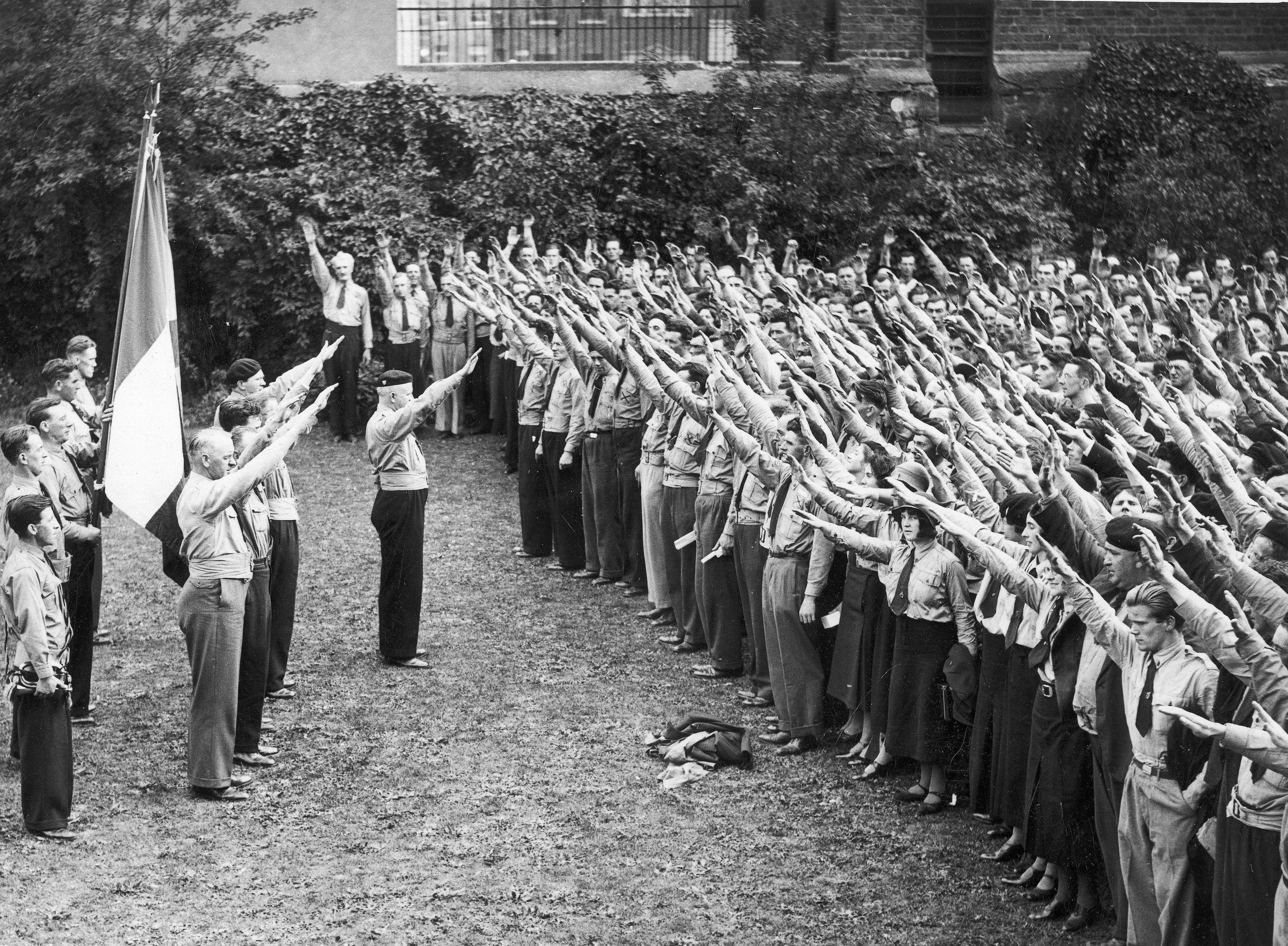
Hogan briefly became involved with the Blueshirts, but quickly became disgusted with their leader Eoin O'Duffy.

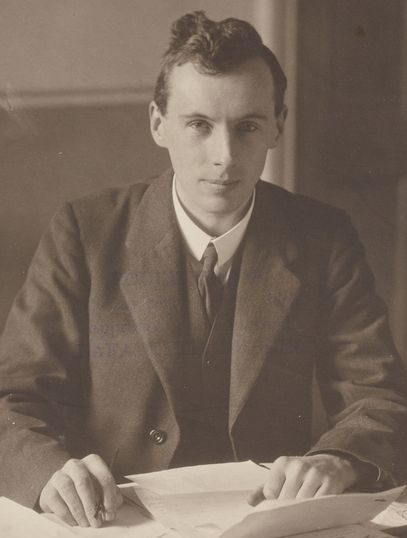
James' brother Patrick Hogan was a government minister for over a decade until he died in a car accident in 1936. James attempted, unsuccessfully, to retain his brother's seat.

Hogan briefly participated in active politics in the mid-1930s. In August 1933 he became a founder-member the Army Comrades Association (better known as the Blueshirts) and in September he was nominated a vice-president of the newly founded Fine Gael party following the merger of the ACA with Cumann na nGaedhael and the National Centre Party. Hogan was attracted to the Blueshirt movement because of its advocacy of organising society along "vocational" (the term used in Ireland for Corporatism) lines, his interest in a Catholic theory of democracy and his deep-seated anti-Communism which grew out of fears during the Irish Civil War. However, in August 1934 Hogan resigned from the Fine Gael national executive "as the strongest protest I can personally make against the generally destructive and hysterical leadership of its president, General Eoin O'Duffy". Hogan's resignation precipitated the collapse of the Blueshirt movement which occurred in the autumn of 1934 and saw O'Duffy resigning his leadership of both the Blueshirts and Fine Gael.

In 1936, on the death of his brother Patrick, Hogan unsuccessfully contested the vacant dáil seat in Galway for Fine Gael during a by-election. He served briefly as a joint honorary secretary of Fine Gael in 1938. In middle and later years he detached himself from all political parties and was critical of successive governments' failure to confront emigration.

== Scholarly work ==
Hogan made significant contributions to Irish historical scholarship, with his work spanning several key areas. His early studies focused on early modern Irish history, where he researched figures like Shane O’Neill and the conflicts of the 1640s. He later turned his attention to early medieval Irish history, particularly land measurement and the political structure of Gaelic society, further developing the work of Eoin MacNeill. As the general editor of Analecta Hibernica, Hogan meticulously edited volumes of early-modern Irish historical documents.

Hogan's scholarly output can be categorized into four main areas: early modern Irish history, early medieval Irish history, modern Irish politics, and his extensive editorial work for Analecta Hibernica and the Irish Manuscripts Commission. Late in his career he switched his focus to political science and published several books on the topic, including Could Ireland Become Communist? (1935), Modern Democracy (1938), and Election and Representation (1945). The latter is considered a foundational work in Irish political science.

Hogan's view of history was shaped by his experiences in the Irish Civil War and his exhaustive studies of Communism, Marxism, and Totalitarianism, leading to a generally pessimistic outlook. Despite this, he has been called "an enlightened progressive" in his studies of Democracy and Cultural nationalism, often challenging his students to think independently. His interest in Hegel and Marxism led to several articles, though his plans for a comprehensive study on these topics were hindered by overwork and intellectual isolation in post-war Cork. His studies on the philosophical origins of Marxism reflected his belief that the Marxist interpretation of Hegelian dialectic was "strangest episodes in the history of idea". Authors of interest to Hogan were Proust, Dostoevsky, James Joyce, and Camus.

== Personal life ==
Hogan married Mary O'Neill (born 1916) from Belgooly, near Kinsale, County Cork in 1935. She became his greatest support and was a welcoming presence to his students at their home at Cluain Meadhon, in Ballintemple in Cork City. They had six children. After a long illness, Hogan died at home, on 24 October 1963.
