= Hogan Jimoh =

Nigerian boxer

Personal information
- Nickname: Atomic Bomb
- Nationality: Nigerian
- Born: 29 December 1955 (age 70) Ilorin, Nigeria
- Weight: lightweight

Boxing career

Boxing record
- Total fights: 36
- Wins: 30 (KO 24)
- Losses: 6 (KO 6)

Hogan "Atomic Bomb" Jimoh Hogan Jimoh.ogg(born December 29, 1955 in Ilorin) is a Nigerian professional lightweight boxer of the 1970s and '80s who won the Nigerian lightweight title, West African Lightweight Title, and Commonwealth lightweight title.
