= Robert Hogan =

Robert or Bob Hogan may refer to:

- Robert Hogan (actor) (1933–2021), American soap opera actor
- Robert Hogan (judge), judge on the Tax Court of Canada
- Robert Hogan (psychologist) (born 1937), American psychologist known for his work in personality testing and assessment
- Robert J. Hogan (writer) (1897–1963), American pulp fiction author
- Robert E. Hogan, eponymous character of Hogan's Heroes, played by Bob Crane
- Bob Hogan (Spooks), fictional character in Spooks
- Bob Hogan (baseball) (1860–1932), American baseball pitcher
