= Patrick Hogan (Cumann na nGaedheal politician) =

Irish politician (1891–1936)

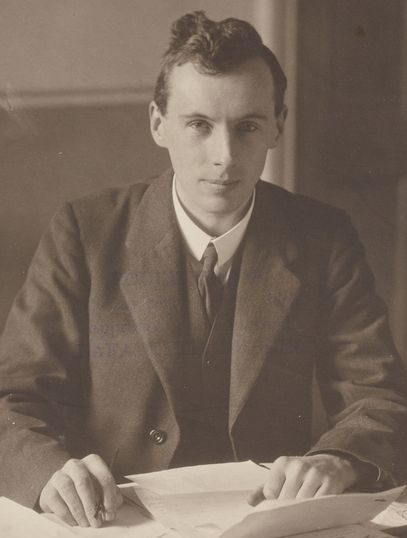
- Hogan in 1922

Minister for Agriculture
- In office 3 April 1930 – 9 March 1932
- Preceded by: Himself as Minister for Lands and Agriculture
- Succeeded by: James Ryan
- In office 11 January 1922 – 2 June 1924
- Preceded by: Art O'Connor
- Succeeded by: Himself as Minister for Lands and Agriculture

Minister for Agriculture and Lands
- In office 2 June 1924 – 3 April 1930
- Preceded by: Himself as Minister for Agriculture
- Succeeded by: Himself as Minister for Agriculture

Minister for Labour
- In office 17 July – 9 September 1922
- Preceded by: Joseph McGrath
- Succeeded by: Office abolished

Teachta Dála
- In office May 1921 – 14 July 1936
- Constituency: Galway

Personal details
- Born: 30 May 1891 Bullaun, County Galway, Ireland
- Died: 14 July 1936 (aged 45) Aughrim, County Galway, Ireland
- Party: Fine Gael
- Other political affiliations: Sinn Féin; Cumann na nGaedheal
- Spouse: Mona Farrell (m. 1930)
- Children: 4, including Brigid
- Relatives: James Hogan (brother); Michael O'Higgins (son-in-law)
- Education: University College Dublin; Law Society of Ireland

Patrick James Hogan (30 May 1891 – 14 July 1936) was an Irish Fine Gael politician who served as Minister for Agriculture from 1922 to 1924 and 1930 to 1932, Minister for Agriculture and Lands from 1924 to 1930 and Minister for Labour from July 1922 to October 1922. He served as a Teachta Dála (TD) for the Galway constituency from 1921 to 1936.

== Early life ==
Hogan was born in Kilrickle, County Galway, the son of Michael Hogan, a farmer, and his wife Bridget (née Glennon). He had six siblings, including his brother James Hogan who later became both a notable revolutionary and historian, and their sister Nora, who became a founding member of the Missionary Sisters of St. Columban in 1922.

Hogan was educated at St. Joseph's College in Ballinasloe and, after completing a BA in history at University College Dublin, was apprenticed to an Ennis solicitor, J. B. Lynch, a relative of his father, and qualified in 1914.

== Political career ==
Hogan's interest in politics can be traced back to 1910. He frequently collected newspaper cuttings of speeches made during the two general election campaigns that year. Hogan had virtually no active role in political affairs over the next few years and, unlike his brothers, he did not join the Irish Republican Brotherhood or the Irish Volunteers. In spite of this he joined Sinn Féin shortly after the 1916 Easter Rising. Hogan, being mistaken for one of his brothers, was arrested in error in 1921 and interned with other republicans in Ballykinlar.

Despite his lack of a fighting record, Hogan's local connections made him a particularly good election candidate in his home constituency of Galway. He was elected to Dáil Éireann at the 1921 general election. Hogan later supported the Anglo-Irish Treaty and was appointed to the subsequent government as the non-cabinet Minister for Agriculture in 1922. He held the same position in the provisional government, while also briefly serving as Minister for Labour, before retaining the agriculture portfolio in the 1st Executive Council of the Irish Free State. The new Cumann na nGaedheal government believed that a better performance in the agriculture sector would help the economy of the fledgling new state. Hogan adopted policies which aimed at improving the competitiveness of agricultural exports. The new Department of Agriculture set standards for production and presentation in eggs, meat and butter. It also extended the farm advisory service and tried to improve breeding stocks and crops. As Minister, Hogan also believed that land purchase was a desirable development. His Land Act, 1923 ordered the compulsory purchase of all land still held by landlords. This process took nearly fifteen years to complete, however, by 1937 all Irish farmers owned their farms. In 1927, Hogan established the Agricultural Credit Association to make loans available to farmers who wanted to improve their farms.

Hogan was killed in a car accident in Aughrim, County Galway, on 14 July 1936, while still a serving TD.

== Personal life ==
Hogan married Mona Davitt (née Farrell), a widow with a young son, on 8 January 1930. She had been married to Michael Davitt, a son of Michael Davitt. They had four daughters, including Brigid Hogan-O'Higgins, who was a Fine Gael TD for several Galway constituencies between 1957 and 1977.

== See also ==
- Families in the Oireachtas

Political offices
| Preceded by Joseph McGrath | Minister for Labour; 1922 | Office abolished |
| Preceded by Art O'Connor | Minister for Agriculture; 1922–1924 | Succeeded by Himself as Minister for Lands and Agriculture |
| Preceded by Himself as Minister for Agriculture | Minister for Lands and Agriculture; 1924–1930 | Succeeded by Himself as Minister for Agriculture |
| Preceded by Himself as Minister for Lands and Agriculture | Minister for Agriculture; 1930–1932 | Succeeded by James Ryan |

| Dáil | Election | Deputy (Party) | Deputy (Party) | Deputy (Party) | Deputy (Party) | Deputy (Party) | Deputy (Party) | Deputy (Party) | Deputy (Party) | Deputy (Party) |
|---|---|---|---|---|---|---|---|---|---|---|
| 2nd | 1921 | Liam Mellows (SF) | Bryan Cusack (SF) | Frank Fahy (SF) | Joseph Whelehan (SF) | Pádraic Ó Máille (SF) | George Nicolls (SF) | Patrick Hogan (SF) | 7 seats 1921–1923 | |
| 3rd | 1922 | Thomas O'Connell (Lab) | Bryan Cusack (AT-SF) | Frank Fahy (AT-SF) | Joseph Whelehan (PT-SF) | Pádraic Ó Máille (PT-SF) | George Nicolls (PT-SF) | Patrick Hogan (PT-SF) | 7 seats 1921–1923 | |
| 4th | 1923 | Thomas O'Connell (Lab) | Barney Mellows (Rep) | Frank Fahy (Rep) | Louis O'Dea (Rep) | Pádraic Ó Máille (CnaG) | George Nicolls (CnaG) | Patrick Hogan (CnaG) | Seán Broderick (CnaG) | James Cosgrave (Ind.) |
| 5th | 1927 (Jun) | Gilbert Lynch (Lab) | Thomas Powell (FF) | Frank Fahy (Note: Frank Fahy served as Ceann Comhairle from 9 March 1932.) (FF) | Seán Tubridy (FF) | Mark Killilea Snr (FF) | Martin McDonogh (CnaG) | Patrick Hogan (CnaG) | Seán Broderick (CnaG) | William Duffy (NL) |
| 6th | 1927 (Sep) | Stephen Jordan (FF) | Thomas Powell (FF) | Frank Fahy (FF) | Seán Tubridy (FF) | Mark Killilea Snr (FF) | Martin McDonogh (CnaG) | Patrick Hogan (CnaG) | Seán Broderick (CnaG) | Joseph Mongan (CnaG) |
| 7th | 1932 | Stephen Jordan (FF) | Thomas Powell (FF) | Frank Fahy (FF) | Patrick Beegan (FF) | Gerald Bartley (FF) | Fred McDonogh (CnaG) | Patrick Hogan (CnaG) | Seán Broderick (CnaG) | Joseph Mongan (CnaG) |
| 8th | 1933 | Stephen Jordan (FF) | Mark Killilea Snr (FF) | Frank Fahy (FF) | Patrick Beegan (FF) | Gerald Bartley (FF) | Séamus Keely (FF) | Patrick Hogan (CnaG) | Seán Broderick (CnaG) | Martin McDonogh (CnaG) |
| 8th | 1935 by-election | Stephen Jordan (FF) | Mark Killilea Snr (FF) | Frank Fahy (FF) | Patrick Beegan (FF) | Gerald Bartley (FF) | Séamus Keely (FF) | Patrick Hogan (CnaG) | Seán Broderick (CnaG) | Eamon Corbett (FF) |
| 8th | 1936 by-election | Stephen Jordan (FF) | Mark Killilea Snr (FF) | Frank Fahy (FF) | Patrick Beegan (FF) | Gerald Bartley (FF) | Séamus Keely (FF) | Martin Neilan (FF) | Seán Broderick (CnaG) | Eamon Corbett (FF) |
| 9th | 1937 | Constituency abolished. See Galway East and Galway West | | | | | | | | |
