= Thomas Hogan =

Thomas Hogan may refer to:

- Thomas F. Hogan (born 1938), US judge
- Thomas Hogan (MP) (died 1586), English politician
- Thomas E. Hogan (born 1959), executive vice president at Hewlett-Packard
- Thomas Eric Hogan (born 1971), Irish former footballer
- Thomas S. Hogan (1869–1957), Montana politician
- Thomas Hogan (artist) (1955–2014), Canadian First Nations artist
- Tom Hogan (born 1956), Australian cricketer
