= Hagen Peak =

Mountain in British Columbia, Canada

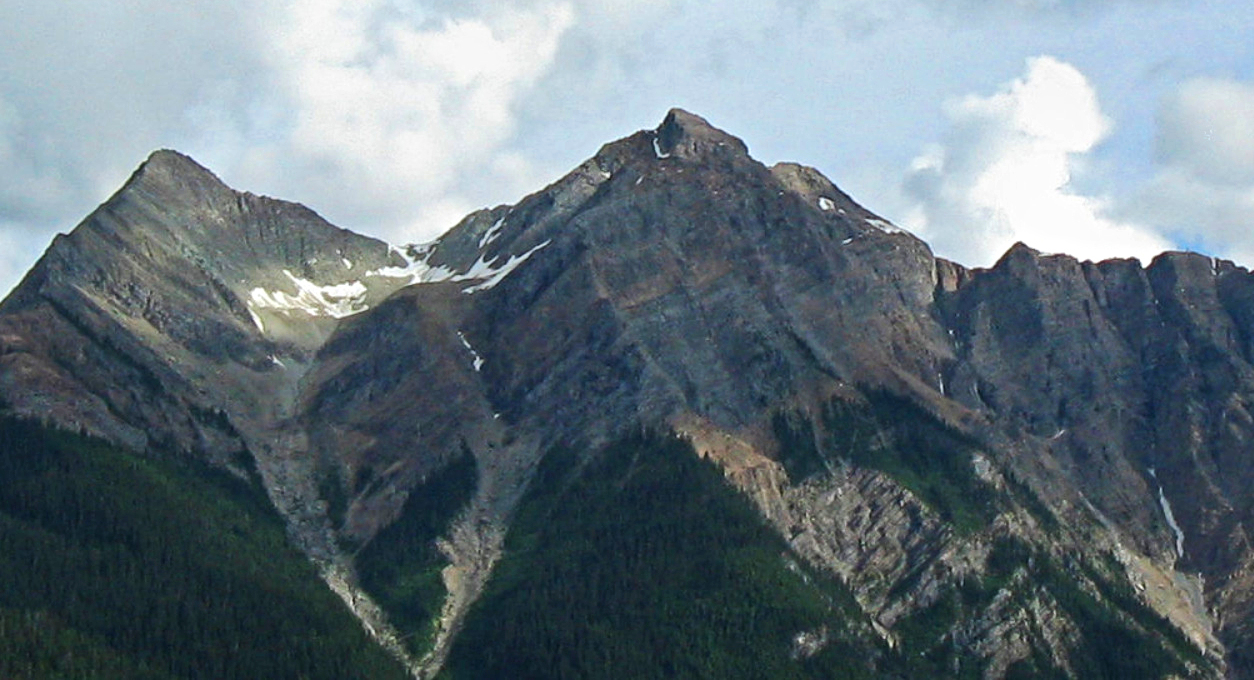
- Hagen Peak, northwest aspect

Highest point
- Elevation: 2,635 m (8,645 ft)
- Prominence: 225 m (738 ft)
- Listing: Mountains of British Columbia
- Coordinates: 51°35′07″N 116°43′05″W

Geography
- Location within British Columbia Location within Canada
- Location: Yoho National Park; British Columbia, Canada
- District: Kootenay Land District
- Parent range: Park Ranges; Canadian Rockies
- Topo map: NTS 82N10 Blaeberry River

Geology
- Rock age: Cambrian
- Rock type: Sedimentary

Hagen Peak is a 2,635-metre (8,645 ft) double summit mountain located on the western boundary of Yoho National Park in the Canadian Rockies of British Columbia, Canada. The mountain is situated 36 km (22 mi) northeast of Golden in the Blaeberry Valley, and less than 13 km (8.1 mi) from the Continental Divide. The mountain was named after Canadian Army Private Alfred G. Hagen of Field, BC, who was serving with the 10th Canadian Infantry Brigade when he was killed in 1944 World War II action, during the liberation of Calais, France. The mountain's name was officially adopted July 5, 1961, when approved by the Geographical Names Board of Canada.

== Climate ==
Based on the Köppen climate classification, Hagen Peak is located in a subarctic climate with cold, snowy winters, and mild summers. Temperatures can drop below −20 °C with wind chill factors below −30 °C. Precipitation runoff from the mountain drains west into the Blaeberry River, or east into headwaters of the Amiskwi River.

== See also ==
- Geology of the Rocky Mountains
- Geography of British Columbia
