= Hagan (given name) =

Hagan is a masculine given name which is borne by:

- Hagan Bayley (born 1951), British biochemist
- Hagan Beggs (1937–2016), Northern Irish-born Canadian actor
- Hagan Evans (fl. 1947–1949), Welsh former rugby union and rugby league footballer
- Hagan Landry (born 1994), American Paralympic athlete specializing in throwing events
- Hagan Scotten, American attorney

== See also ==
- Hagen (given name)
