= Hagan, Virginia =

Unincorporated community in Virginia, United States

Coordinates: 36°42′15″N 83°17′12″W

Hagan is an unincorporated community in Lee County, Virginia, United States.

== History ==
Hagan was named for Patrick Hagan, an original owner of the town site. A post office was established at Hagan in 1892, and remained in operation until it was discontinued in 1952.
