= Paul Hogan (disambiguation) =

Paul Hogan (born 1939) is an Australian actor.

Paul Hogan may also refer to:

- Paul Hogan (American football) (1898–1976), American football player
- Paul Hogan (butler), Australian-American former consul, butler, and television personality
- Paul Hogan (darts player) (born 1963), English darts player
- P. J. Hogan (born 1962), Australian film director
- J. Paul Hogan (1919–2012), American chemist (plastics inventor)
- Paul Hogan (rugby union) (born 1968), Irish rugby union player
