= Carl Locher =

Danish realist painter

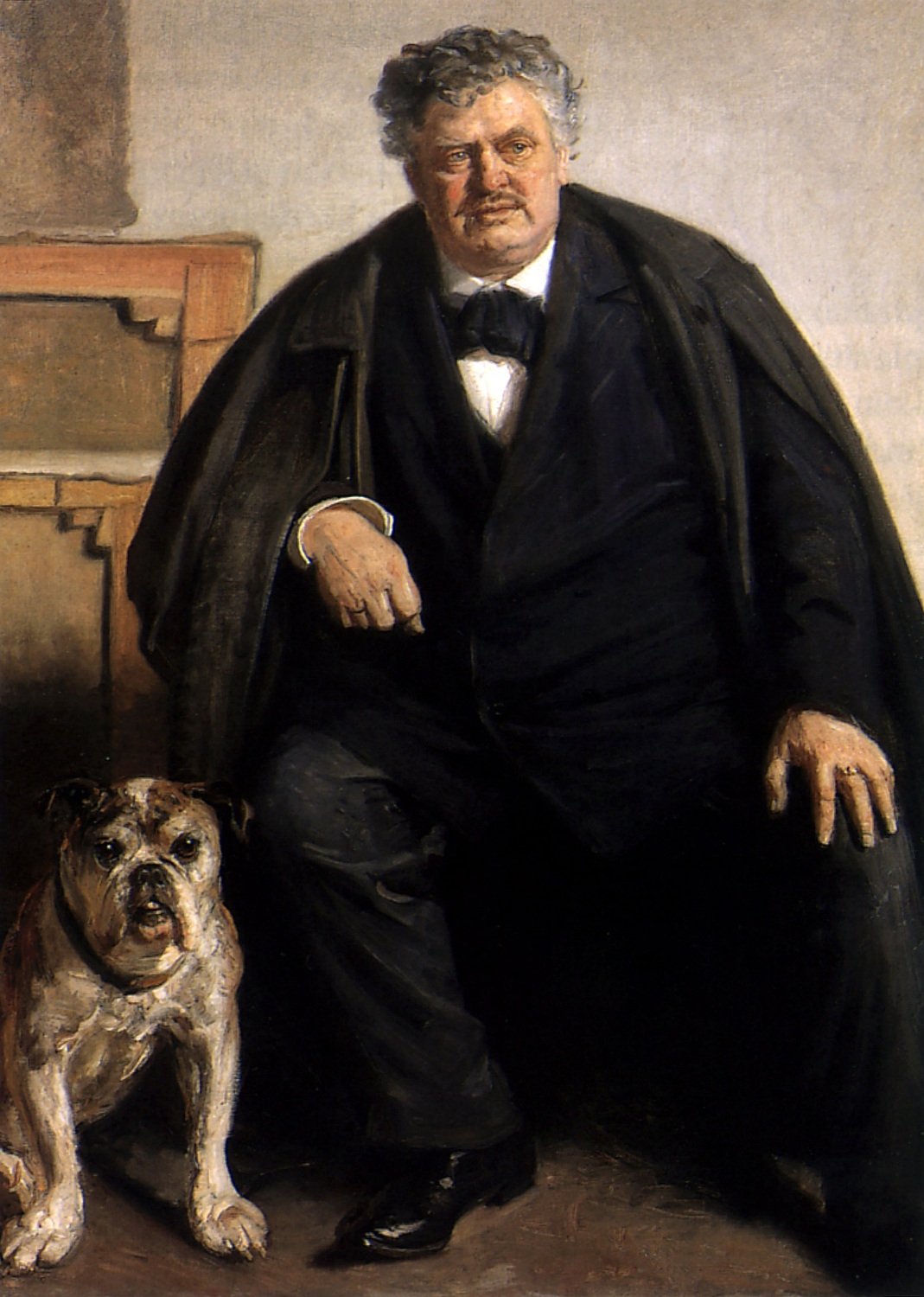
- Carl Locher painted with his dog Tiger by Michael Ancher in 1909
- Born: 21 November 1851; Flensburg, Duchy of Schleswig
- Died: 20 December 1915 (aged 64); Skagen, Denmark
- Education: Royal Danish Academy of Fine Arts
- Known for: Painting
- Movement: Skagen Painters

Carl Locher (21 November 1851 – 20 December 1915) was a Danish realist painter who from an early age became a member of the Skagen group of painters.

== Biography ==
Carl Ludvig Thilson Locher was born in Flensburg in the Duchy of Schleswig which was then part of Denmark. From an early age he took an interest in ships and received his first training from his father who painted ship portraits for a living. After the father died, he continued his business for a short while and went on several voyages with ships of the Royal Danish Navy. Struck by the grandeur of the Atlantic Ocean, a voyage to the Danish West Indies made a particular impression on him.

Even before he began his studies at the Royal Danish Academy of Art in 1872, he was encouraged by Holger Drachmann to spend a couple of months in Skagen, the artists colony in the far north of Jutland. He quickly completed paintings of the beach, some with fishing boats or wrecks. He also became interested in the horse-drawn carriage which travelled along the beach on its journey from Frederikshavn. In the 1870s, Locher continued his studies in Paris where he trained at the studio of Léon Bonnat 1875–76, 1878–79. He visited Skagen whenever he was back in Denmark. Ultimately he had a house built there where he lived until his death.

As an etcher Locher was regarded among the best and most productive of the Danish artists; From 1885 he made a number of smaller and larger prints, with a lot of picturesque energy. In 1892, he devoted most of his time to the art of etching, and travelled—with support from the Danish state—to Berlin, where he became a student of the excellent copper etching artist professor Hans Meyer (1846–1910) at the Berlin University of the Arts (Hochschule der Künste Berlin). A complete collection of his prints can be found at Skagens Museum.

Supported by the State, he opened an etching school for Danish artists in Copenhagen, where he taught until 1900. Skagen painters such as Anna Ancher and Michael Ancher and P.S. Krøyer attended the school.

== Selected paintings ==
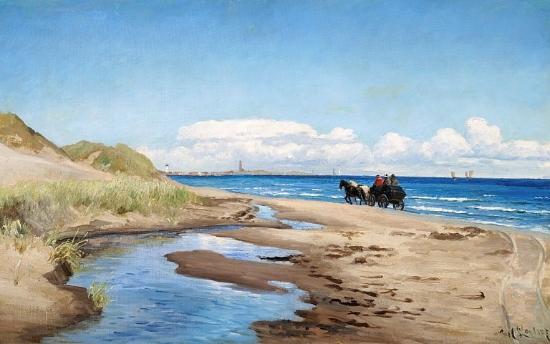
Stage Coach Heading for Skagen

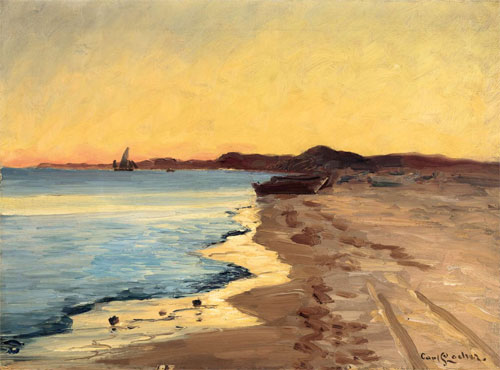
South Beach After Sunset

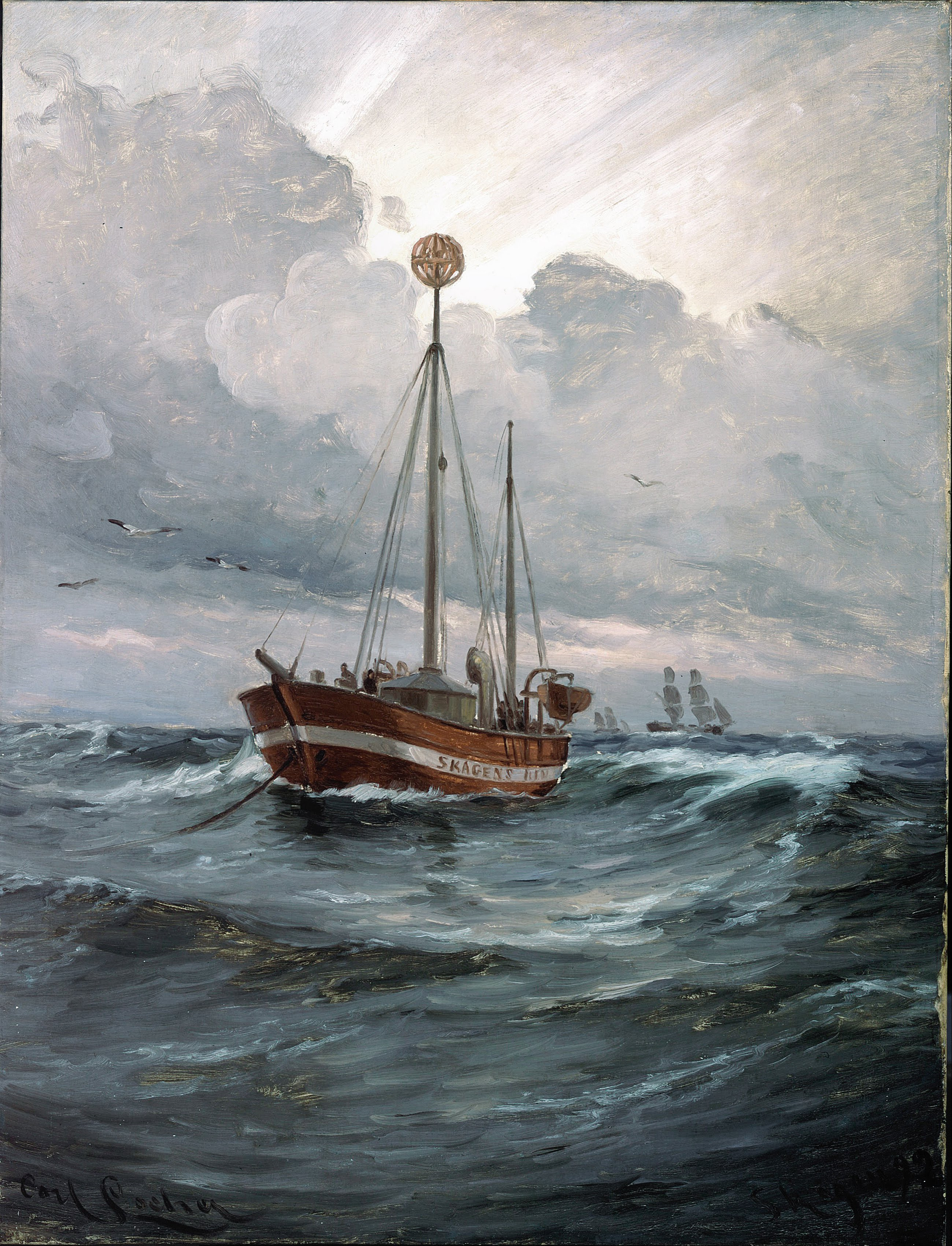
Lightship at Skagen Reef

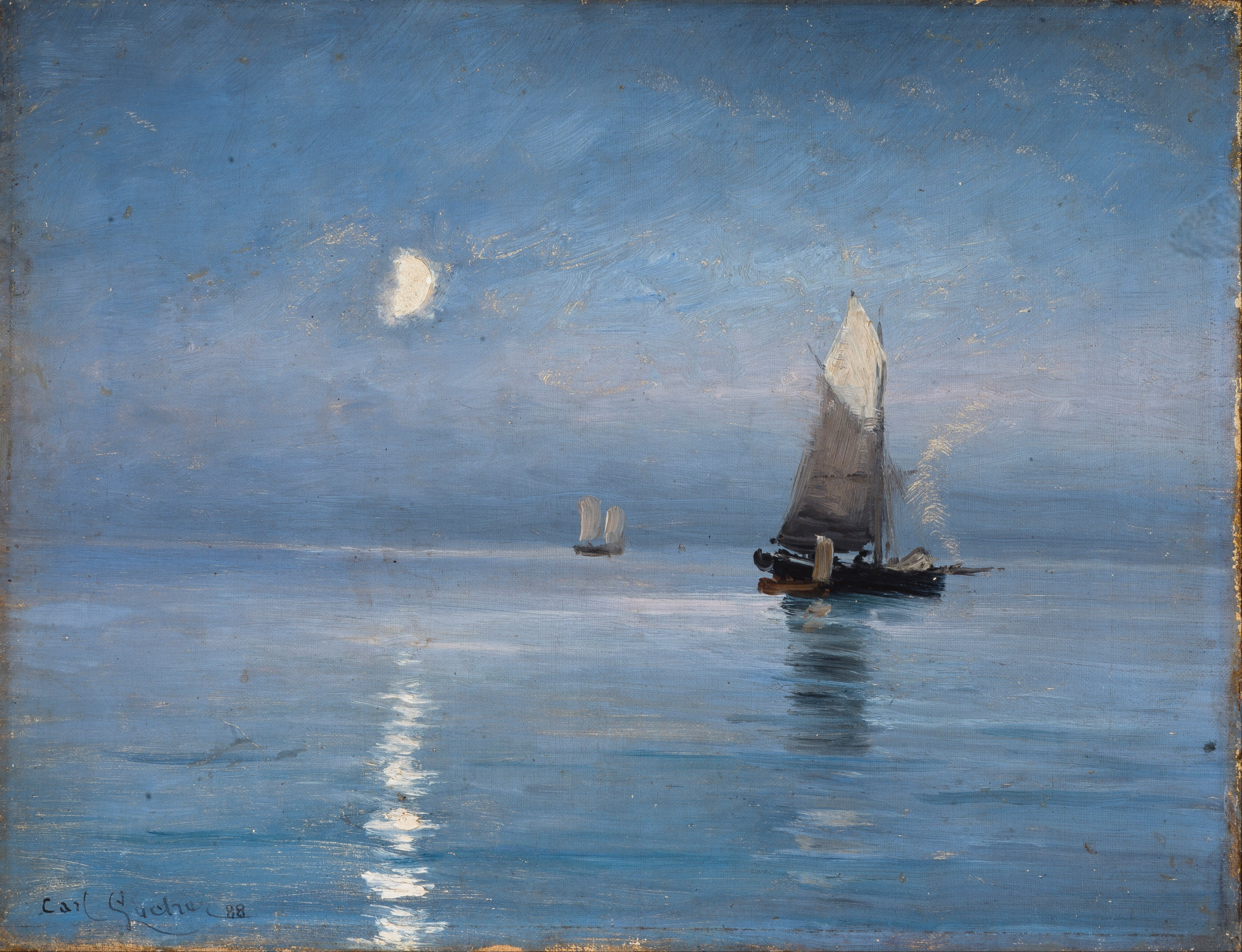
Fishing Cutters in the Moonlight

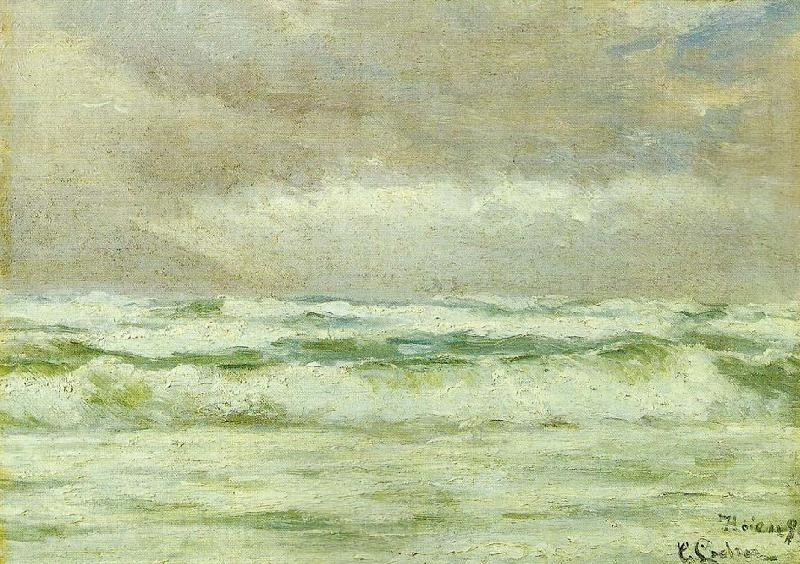
Storm off Højen

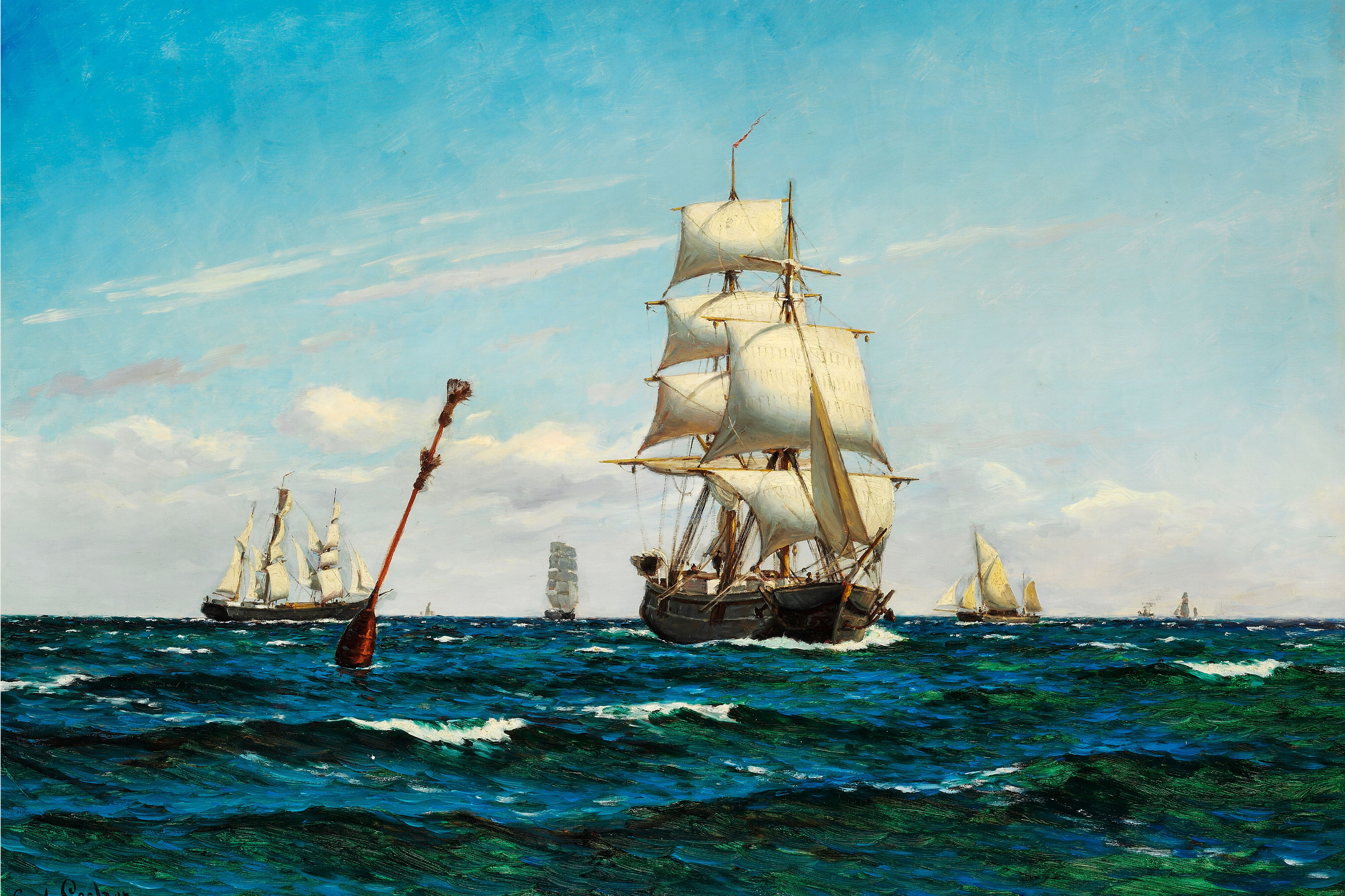
Sailing Ships at Sea

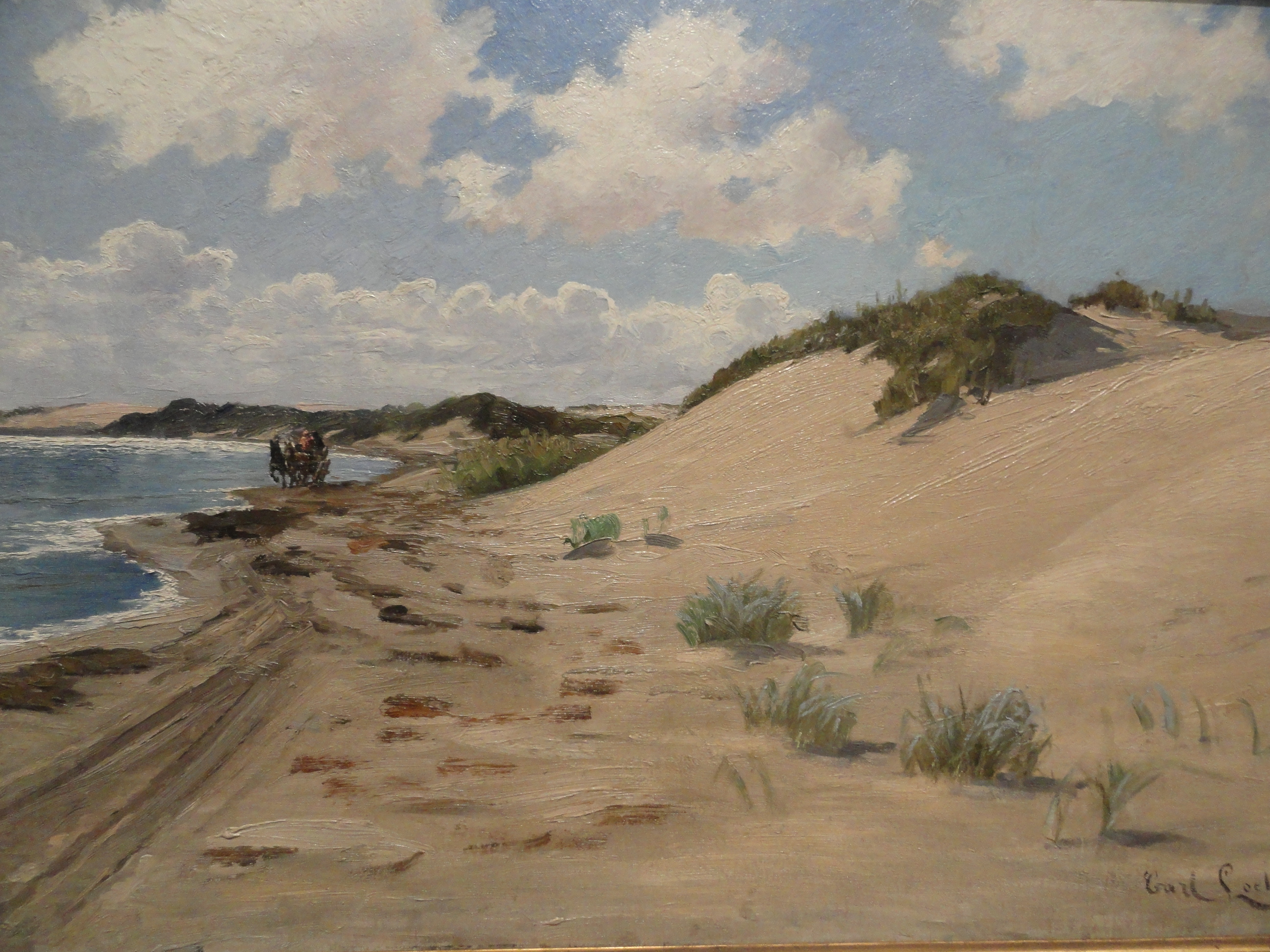
Mail Coach on the Beach

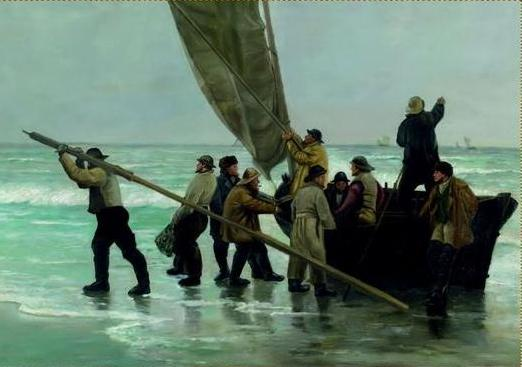
Fishermen Coming Ashore

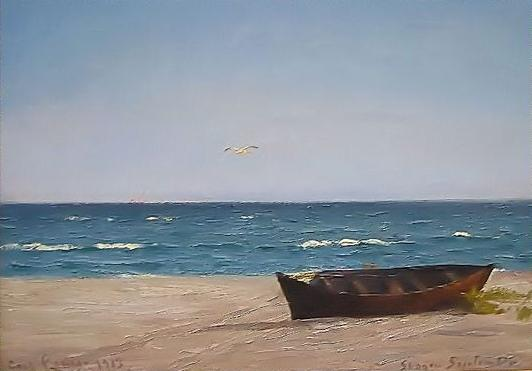
Skagen Beach

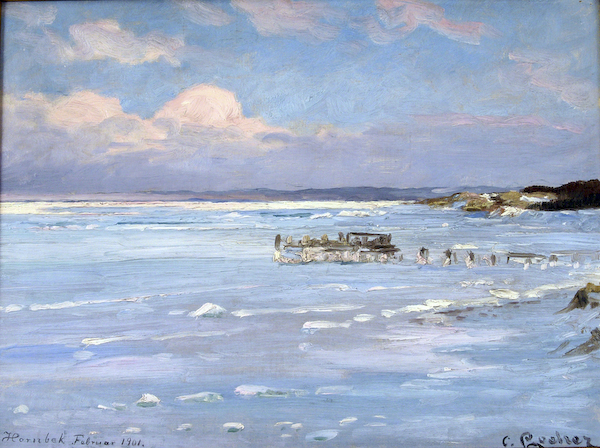
Hornbaek Beach

== See also ==
- Skagen Painters

== Literature ==
- Olsen, Claus (1998). Krøyer and the artists' colony at Skagen. National Gallery of Ireland. ISBN 9780903162777.
- Schmidt Hansen, Peter (2010). Skagensmaleren Carl Locher (in Danish). Peter Schmidt Hansen. ISBN 978-87-994055-0-3.
- Svanholm, Lise (2004). Northern Light: The Skagen Painters. Gyldendal A/S. ISBN 978-87-02-02817-1.
