= Church-Goers Arriving by Boat at the Parish Church of Leksand on Siljan Lake =

1853 painting by Wilhelm Marstrand

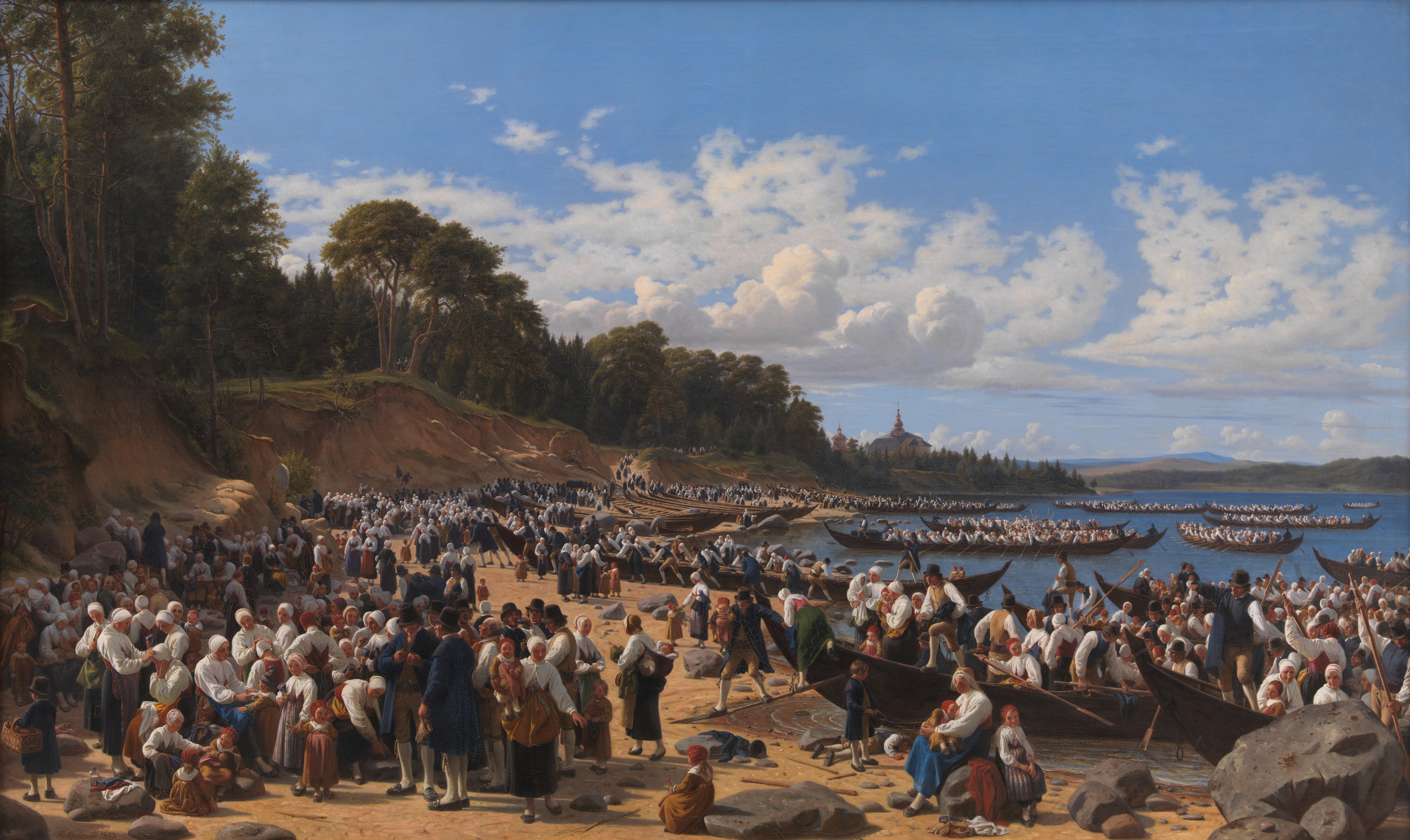
- Artist: Wilhelm Marstrand
- Year: 1853
- Medium: oil on canvas
- Dimensions: 130.5 cm × 215 cm (51.4 in × 85 in)
- Location: Danish National Gallery, Copenhagen

Church-Goers Arriving by Boat at the Parish Church of Leksand on Siljan Lake, Sweden (Danish: Kirkefærd i Dalarne i Sverige. Til Leksands sognekirke i Dalarne kommer folket i deres store kirkebåde over Siljansøen om søndagen til gudstjeneste), is an oil on canvas painting by Wilhelm Marstrand. It is in the collection of the National Gallery of Denmark.

== History ==
On 8 June 1850, Marstrand married Margrethe Christine Weidemann (1824–1867) in Frederiksberg Church. The ongoing First Schleswig War made it impossible to travel south on their honeymoon. On the recommendation of Hans Christian Andersen, a friend of Marstrand, they chose instead to go to Dalarna in Sweden.

Back from his honeymoon, Marstrand received a commission from C.- A. Thomsen for a large painting of this scene for the Danish National Gallery. In his book I Sverige (1851), Andersen had described the colourful tableau with the church-goers:

In Danish
Tolv lil fjorten lange Baade, af Form som Gondoler, laae allerede trukket op paa den flade Strandbred, der her er oversaaet med store Steen; disse selv tjente de Landstigende til Bro; hen til disse lagde Baadene, og Folkene klattrede, gik og bar hinanden gjensidig iland. Der stode vist henved tusinde Mennesker paa Strandbredden, og langt ude paa Søen kom en ti å tolv Baade endnu, nogle paa sexten Aarer, andre paa tyve, ja fire og tyve, roede af Mandfolk og Fruentimmer, og hver Baad pyntet med grønne Grene. Disse og de brogede klædninger gav det Hele noget saa festligt, saa phantastisk right, som man ikke skulde troe Norden eier det. Baadene kom nærmere, alle propfulde af Mennesker; men stille, uden Støj og Tale kom de og balancerede op til SkovskraMiten; Baadene blev trukne op paa Sandet; det var til at male, især eet Punkt, nemlig Veien op ad Skovskrænten, hvor den hele Skare bevæger sig mellem Træer og Buske. Ved Kirken formentes paa en saadan Dag at være over femtusinde Mennesker samlede; » Maler, tag Skizzebog og Farver, drag op i Dalarne, Billed ved Billed vil aabenbare sig for dig. «

In English
"Twelve or fourteen long boats, shaped as gondolas, were already drawn up on the flat shore, which was dotted with large boulders; these served the arrivers as a bridge; the boats berthed at them, and the people climbed, walked and carried each other ashore. There must have been around one thousand people on the shore, and far out on the lake came another ten to twelve boats, some with sixteen oars, others with twenty, or even twenty-four, rowed by men and women, and each boat decorated with green branches.These and the colourful garments made it all so festive, so fantastically rich, that one would not have thought the North owned it. The boats came closer, all packed with people; but quiet, without any noise or speech, did they come and balance up to the forest slope; the boats were pulled up on the sand; it was something to paint, especially one point, namely the road up the forest slope where the whole crowd moves up between trees and bushes. On such a day more than five thousand people gather at the church; "Painter, take Sketchbook and Colours, go up in the valleys, Picture after Picture will reveal itself to you."

In July 1851, Marstrand therefore returned to Lake Siljan. In Leksand, he created numerous preparatory sketches for the large painting. It was completed in early 1853. The painting was ready for the opening of the annual Charlottenborg Spring Exhibition on 31 March 1853.

== Description ==
In Wilhelm Marstrand – A cosmopolitan artist caught in a vortex of images (2020), Jesper Svenningsen has described the painting as a highlight in Marstrand's production. He observes: "In contrast to virtually all of Marstrand’s earlier depictions of life, he chose here to eschew anecdote and suppress any urge to caricature or beautify. Instead, he has chosen a panoramic scene and gone on to orchestrate the crowd with a tautness of composition more reminiscent of a battle scene than of a rural population assembling on a perfectly ordinary Sunday morning."
