= Mike Hogan =

Mike Hogan may refer to:

- Mike Hogan (American football) (born 1954), former NFL running back
- Mike Hogan (athlete) (born 1943), British Olympic hurdler
- Mike Hogan (The Cranberries) (born 1973), member of Irish alternative rock band The Cranberries
- Mike Hogan, member of Christian rock band David Crowder Band
- Mike Hogan (sportscaster) (born 1963), Canadian sportscaster
- Mike Hogan (Florida politician), Duval County supervisor of elections, former tax appraiser, and former state legislator

== See also ==
- Michael Hogan (disambiguation)
