= Hagen (given name) =

Hagen is a masculine given name. Bearers of the name include:

- Hagen Danner (born 1998), American baseball player
- Hagen Kearney (born 1991), American snowboarder
- Hagen Kleinert (born 1941), German theoretical physicist
- Hagen Kunze (born 1973), German journalist, music critic and playwright
- Hagen Liebing (1961–2016), German bass player for the punk band Die Ärzte and journalist
- Hagen von Ortloff (born 1949), German television presenter
- Hagen Reeck (born 1959), German football manager and former player
- Hagen Reinhold (born 1978), German politician
- Hagen Rether (born 1969), Romanian-born German political cabaret artist and musician
- Hagen Schulte (born 1993), New Zealand rugby union player
- Hagen Schulze (1943–2014), German historian
- Hagen Stamm (born 1960), German former water polo player
- Hagen Stehr (born 1941), German-born Australian businessman

== See also ==
- Hagan (given name)
