= Gary Hogan =

Irish footballer (born 1947)

Gary Hogan (born 16 January 1947) is an Irish football manager and former player.

== Early life ==
As a youth player, Hogan joined the youth academy of Irish side Home Farm FC.

== Career ==
Hogan worked as a manager and received comparisons to Portuguese manager Jose Mourinho while managing Norwegian side IL Stjørdals-Blink.

== Style of play ==
Hogan has been described as "very authoritarian goalkeeper, and is good at cleaning up".

== Personal life ==
Hogan is a native of Dublin, Republic of Ireland.
