= William Hogan =

William or Bill Hogan may refer to:

- William Hogan (author) (born 1937), American novelist
- William Hogan (Canadian politician) (1937–2022), member of the Newfoundland House of Assembly
- William Hogan (footballer) (1871–?), English footballer
- William Hogan (American politician) (1792–1874), United States Representative from New York
- William Hogan (priest), excommunicated Roman Catholic priest and author
- Bill Hogan III, American ice hockey player
- Bill Hogan (politician), member of the New Brunswick Legislative Assembly
- Billy Hogan, American singer and songwriter
