= Happy Hogan =

Happy Hogan may refer to:

- Happy Hogan (character), character in the Iron Man comics series
  - Happy Hogan (Marvel Cinematic Universe), the same character, in movies
- Happy Hogan (baseball) (1877–1915), American baseball player
- Happy Hogan, character in the 1950 film Champagne for Caesar played by Art Linkletter
