= John Baptist Hogan =

John Baptist Hogan (24 June 1829 – 29 September 1901), also known as Abbé Hogan, was an Irish-French Catholic theologian and educator. He was born near Ennis, County Clare, Ireland, and died at Saint-Sulpice, Paris, France.

Hogan, a member of the Sulpician order, was the first rector of Saint John's Seminary in Boston, founded in 1884. From 1889 to 1894, he taught at the new Catholic University in Washington, D.C., but returned to Saint John's Seminary for another term as rector after the death of his successor, Charles B. Rex.

His nephew Dr. John F Hogan DD served as president of Maynooth College in Ireland.
