= John Hogan (mathematician) =

S. John Hogan is a professor of Applied Mathematics and leader of the "Applied Nonlinear Mathematics Group" in the Department of Engineering Mathematics, University of Bristol. He is known for his work in numerous applications of non-linear dynamics including water waves liquid crystals.

Hogan is principal investigator on several large EPSRC grants, in 2008 totalling around £6M – an unusually high total for a UK mathematician. These include the "Bristol Centre for Complexity Sciences", the "Bristol Centre for Applied Nonlinear Mathematics", "Applied Nonlinear Mathematics: Making it Real".

== Recent publications ==
- Homer, M. E.; Hogan, S. J. (1 February 2007). "Impact Dynamics of Large Dimensional Systems". International Journal of Bifurcation and Chaos. 17 (2): 561–573. doi:10.1142/S0218127407017422. hdl:1983/309. ISSN 0218-1274.
- Kyrychko, Y.N; Blyuss, K.B; Gonzalez-Buelga, A; Hogan, S.J; Wagg, D.J (8 April 2006). "Real-time dynamic substructuring in a coupled oscillator–pendulum system". Proceedings of the Royal Society A: Mathematical, Physical and Engineering Sciences. 462 (2068): 1271–1294. doi:10.1098/rspa.2005.1624. hdl:1983/539. ISSN 1364-5021.
- Kowalczyk, P.; Di Bernardo, M.; Champneys, A. R.; Hogan, S. J.; Homer, M.; Piiroinen, P. T.; Kuznetsov, Yu. A.; Nordmark, A. (1 March 2006). "Two-Parameter Discontinuity-Induced Bifurcations of Limit Cycles: Classification and Open Problems". International Journal of Bifurcation and Chaos. 16 (3): 601–629. doi:10.1142/S0218127406015015. ISSN 0218-1274.
- Szalai, Róbert; Stépán, Gábor; Hogan, S. John (1 December 2004). "Global dynamics of low immersion high-speed milling". Chaos: An Interdisciplinary Journal of Nonlinear Science. 14 (4): 1069–1077. doi:10.1063/1.1807395. hdl:1983/437. ISSN 1054-1500. PMID 15568921.
