= John F. Hogan =

Irish priest, President of Maynooth College 1912-1918

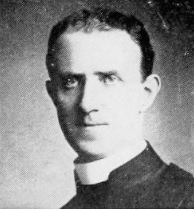
- Born: John Francis Hogan; 1858; County Clare, Ireland
- Died: 24 November 1918 (aged 59–60); Dublin, Ireland
- Education: St. Sulpice, Paris; University of Freiburg
- Occupations: Clergyman, educator

John Francis Hogan (1858–1918) was an Irish priest and educator, who served as President of St. Patrick's College, Maynooth from 1912 until 1918.

== Biography ==
Born in County Clare in 1858, Hogan was educated in Ennis, before completing his studies at St. Sulpice, Paris and in the University of Freiburg.

He was ordained to the priesthood in 1882 and served for three years as a curate in Birr, County Offaly.

In 1886, he was appointed Professor of Modern Languages at Maynooth College, and in 1888 Vice President. In 1894 he succeeded Robert Browne (bishop), who had been appointed to Roman Catholic Diocese of Cloyne, as editor of the Irish Ecclesiastical Record.

He succeeded to the college presidency in 1912 when Monsignor Daniel Mannix was similarly elevated to the episcopate.

Canon Hogan served as a member of the senate and pro-vice chancellor of the newly constituted National University of Ireland.

Dr. Hogan was nephew of the Very Rev. John Baptist Hogan, S.S., D.D., a member of the Sulpician order who was Rector of St. John's Seminary, Boston.

Monsignor Hogan resigned as president of Maynooth in October 1918 and died in Dublin on 24 November 1918. He was succeeded in Maynooth by his vice president Monsignor James MacCaffrey.

He was president during the events of Easter Week 1916. In 2016 centenary events brought to light contemporary evidence of the attitude of both seminary staff and students to the Easter Rising.

== Works ==
Hogan contributed many articles to American Catholic Quarterly and the Dublin Review, and wrote the article on Maynooth College for the Catholic Encyclopedia. He also wrote:

- The Life and Works of Dante Allighieri: Being an Introduction to the Study of the "Divina Commedia", 1899.
- Catholics and Trinity College
- Maynooth and the Laity
