= Virginia D. Hogan =

American chemist (1929–2004)

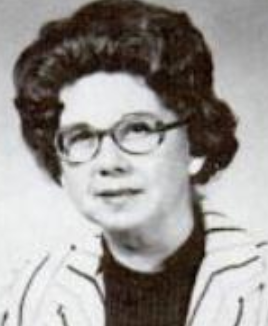
- Virginia D. Hogan, from a 1976 publication of the United States Army
- Born: Virginia Dolores Hogan; January 20, 1929; New York City
- Died: October 13, 2004 (aged 75); Denville, New Jersey
- Occupation: Chemist
- Known for: Explosives expert at US Army arsenal

Virginia Dolores Hogan (January 20, 1929 – October 13, 2004) was an American chemist, specializing in pyrotechnics, and "the only woman research chemist at Picatinny Arsenal," a large United States Army installation in New Jersey.

== Early life and education ==
Hogan was born in New York City, daughter of John J. Hogan and Edna C. Thielmann Hogan. She earned a bachelor's degree in chemistry from St. John's University in 1949, and a master's degree in chemistry from Fordham University.

== Career ==
Hogan worked at Picatinny Arsenal for 47 years. She conducted basic pyrotechnics research on explosives for bombs, flares, signals, and tracking devices. She was "the only woman research chemist at Picatinny Arsenal", according to a 1963 profile. In the 1970s, she compiled "a data bank of nuclear magnetic resonance (NMR) spectra of all known explosives," for use in testing and identifying unknown explosives.

Hogan was a fellow of the American Association for the Advancement of Science. She received the Army Meritorious Civilian Service Award. In 1983, she was one of 31 recipients of the Secretary of Defense Award for Productivity Excellence. By 1996, she was president of the arsenal's employee union.

== Publications ==
By 1976, Hogan had written or co-written more than 25 technical papers. Her research was published in Journal of Physical Chemistry, Combustion and Flame, Journal of Chemical & Engineering Data, Radiation Research, and Analytical Chemistry.

- "Pre-ignition and Ignition Reactions of the System Barium Peroxide–Magnesium–Calcium Resinate" (1957, with Saul Gordon)
- "Differential Thermal Analysis and Thermogravimetry Applied to Potassium Perchlorate-Aluminum-Barium Nitrate Mixtures" (1957, with Saul Gordon and Clement Campbell)
- "Studies in the Radiolysis of Ferrous Sulfate Solutions: II. Effect of Acid Concentration in Solutions Containing Oxygen" (1957, with A. O. Allen and Walter G. Rothschild)
- "A Thermoanalytical Study of the Binary Oxidant System Potassium Perchlorate–Barium Nitrate" (1958, with Saul Gordon)
- "Pre-ignition and ignition reactions of the propagatively reacting system magnesium sodium nitrate Laminac" (1959, with Saul Gordon)
- "Apparatus for Observing Physical Changes at Elevated Temperatures. Application to Differential Thermal Analysis" (1960, with Saul Gordon)
- "A Thermoanalytical Study of the Reciprocal System 2KNO_{3} + BaCl_{2} ⇄ 2KCl + Ba(NO_{3})_{2}" (1960, with Saul Gordon)
- "Thermoanalysis of Binary Systems. Potassium Perchlorate-Alkali and Alkaline Earth Metal Nitrates" (1961, with Saul Gordon)
- "Thermoanalysis of Some Inorganic Fluorides and Silicofluorides" (1964, with E. S. Freeman)
- "Effects of changes in chemical reactivity and decomposition characteristics of potassium perchlorate on the thermal ignition of magnesium potassium perchlorate mixtures" (1965, with E. S. Freeman and David A. Anderson)
- "Determination of free magnesium by combined hydrogen evolution and gas chromatography" (1968, with Francis R. Taylor)
- "Kinetic Studies and Product Characterization during the Basic Hydrolysis of Glyceryl Nitrate Esters" (1979, with C. Capellos, W. Fisco, C. Ribaudo, and Joseph J. Campisi)
- "Qualification of Analytical Reference Energetic Materials" (1980, with Roscoe Croom, Clement Campbell Jr., William J. Fisco, Wong Fun Ark, Thomas C. Castorina, and Joseph J. Campisi)
- "Basic hydrolysis of glyceryl nitrate esters. I. 1‐glyceryl and 2‐glyceryl nitrate esters" (1982, with C. Capellos, W. Fisco, C. Ribaudo, J. Campisi, F. X. Murphy, T. Castorina, and D. Rosenblatt)

== Personal life ==
Hogan died in 2004 in Denville, New Jersey, aged 75 years.
