= Hogan McLaughlin =

American fashion designer, artist, dancer, and musician

- Born: February 25, 1989 (age 37); Chicago, Illinois, United States
- Occupations: Fashion designer, artist, dancer

Hogan McLaughlin (born February 25, 1989) is an American fashion designer, artist, and dancer. He garnered acclaim after meeting and collaborating with heiress Daphne Guinness, who became a champion and muse for his collections. McLaughlin has also produced a number of pieces for Lady Gaga's "Born This Way Ball", sparking interest and recognition within the fashion community. He has since been profiled by The New York Times, Women's Wear Daily, and Vogue, among others.

== Early life and education ==
McLaughlin was raised in River Forest, Illinois. He began dance classes at age two and continued to study ballet throughout his childhood. He attended Oak Park and River Forest High School before leaving at age 16 to join the second company of Hubbard Street Dance Chicago.

== Career ==
After leaving high school, McLaughlin danced with Hubbard Street 2 for two years before being promoted to an apprentice position with the main company. There, he danced acclaimed works by choreographers such as Ohad Naharin, Johan Inger, and Nacho Duato, touring internationally.

In 2009, McLaughlin left Hubbard Street Dance Chicago to move to New York City to pursue a career in visual art, a passion of his since childhood. While there, he came in contact with heiress and fashion icon Daphne Guinness via Twitter. They exchanged messages before meeting in person, launching a major commission for McLaughlin within 24 hours. His work resulted in a feature in The New York Times, the windows of Barneys New York, and as a part of Guinness' exhibition at F.I.T.

McLaughlin released his first full collection for New York Fashion Week in September 2011. Guinness wore one of the pieces to the October 2011 opening of her F.I.T. exhibit. Since then, pieces have also been worn by Billy Porter, Chrissy Teigan, Chelsea Wolfe, and Lady Gaga, who took an immediate interest in his work. Gaga later commissioned McLaughlin to create a number of pieces for the promotional images for her "Born This Way Ball".

As an illustrator, McLaughlin has contributed images to television shows including HBO's Game of Thrones and Showtime's Penny Dreadful.

== Personal life ==
McLaughlin briefly lived in Salem, Massachusetts with his partner and frequent collaborator, artist Bill Crisafi, before relocating back to Chicago. The couple have been engaged since 2017.
