= Hagen, Ekenäs =

Natural park in Ekenäs, Finland

Coordinates: 59°58′0″N 23°26′5″E

Hagen is a 26-hectare natural park, and part of the town of Raseborg in Finland. It is located at the southwestern end of the municipality that was formerly the independent town of Ekenäs, prior to merging with Snappertuna and Tenala in January 2009. A pedestrian bridge from Hagen connects it to the island of Ramsholmen, which is itself connected to the island of Högholmen. These three areas are connected to form the Hagen-Ramsholmen-Högholmen area, roughly 58 hectares. Many of the deciduous trees found in the area are some of the largest of their species in Finland.
