= Joe Hogan =

Joe Hogan may refer to:

- Joe Hogan (footballer, born 1875) (1875–1943), Australian rules footballer for St Kilda
- Joe Hogan (footballer, born 1909) (1909–1993), Australian rules footballer for Melbourne
- Joe Hogan (footballer, born 1938), Scottish footballer for Partick Thistle
- Joe Hogan (Pennsylvania politician), American politician and member of the Pennsylvania House of Representatives

== See also ==
- Joseph Hogan (1937–2014), American politician and member of the Nevada Assembly
- Joseph Lloyd Hogan (1916–2000), Roman Catholic bishop
