= Edward Hogan (Missouri politician) =

American politician

Edward J. "Jellyroll" Hogan Jr. (October 15, 1885 – August 11, 1963) was an American Democratic politician who served in the Missouri General Assembly. He served in the Missouri Senate between 1945 and 1957 after serving in the Missouri House of Representatives.

Born in St. Louis, Missouri, he was educated in the public and parochial schools of St. Louis. On February 15, 1905, Hogan married Jennie Durr of St. Louis who died on June 21, 1931, as the mother of five children. Hogan was active in Democratic Party politics for about half a century.
