= Dennis Hogan (sociologist) =

American sociologist

Dennis P. Hogan is an American sociologist, currently the Robert E. Turner Distinguished Professor in Population at Brown University, and also a published author. From 1987 to 1995, he was the Distinguished Professor of Sociology and Director of the Population Research Institute, Pennsylvania State University.

Hogan received a PhD in sociology from the University of Wisconsin–Madison in 1976.

== Publications ==
- "The transition to adulthood", DP Hogan, NM Astone, Annual Review of Sociology, Vol. 12:109-130, 1986.
- "The structure of intergenerational exchanges in American families", Dennis P. Hogan, David J. Eggebeen and Clifford C. Clogg, American Journal of Sociology, 98:6, 1993
- "Giving between generations in American families", David J. Eggebeen, Dennis P. Hogan, Human Nature, 1:3, 1990
- "The Variable Order of Events in the Life Course", Dennis P. Hogan, American Sociological Review, 43:4, 1978
- "Race, kin networks, and assistance to mother-headed families", DP Hogan, LX Hao, WL Parish, Social Forces, 68:3, pages 797-812, 1990
