= Michael Hogan (writer) =

American poet

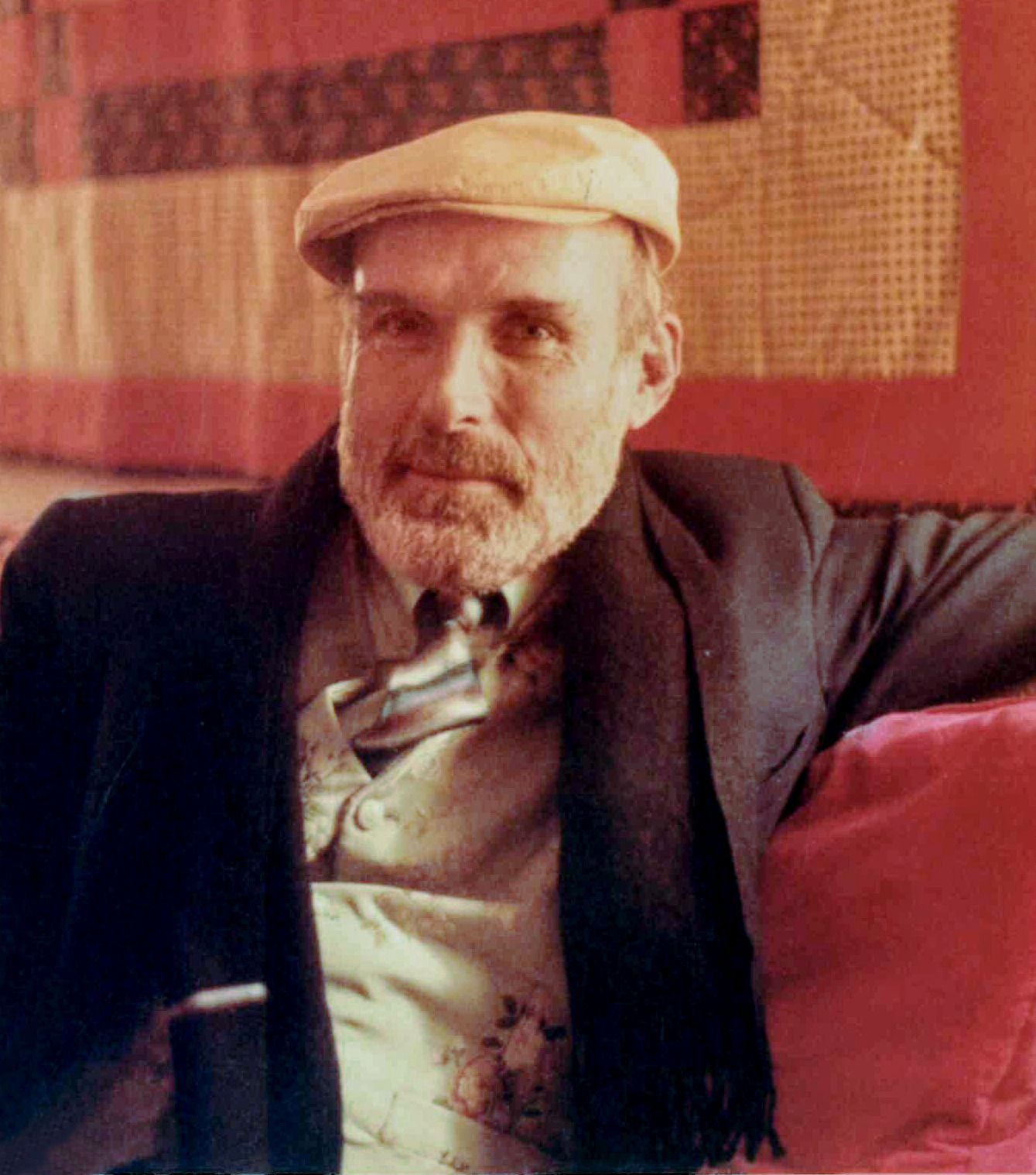
- Born: July 14, 1943 (age 83); Newport, Rhode Island
- Education: B.A. and MFA in Creative Writing; Ph.D. in Latin American Studies
- Occupations: Poet, historian, author
- Spouse: Cynthia Hooper (1964-1969) Jojo Danaker (1977-1984) Lucinda Mayo (1990-present)
- Children: Francis Garrison (Gary) (deceased), Melissa Field
- Writing career
- Language: English, Spanish
- Genres: Poetry, history, fiction, non-fiction
- Subjects: Mexican history, global politics, American literature, poetry
- Notable works: Irish Soldiers of Mexico, Abraham Lincoln and Mexico, Savage Capitalism and the Myth of Democracy, Winter Solstice, A Lion at a Cocktail Party, Making Our Own Rules
- Notable awards: PEN Award; Pushcart Prizes; Benjamin Franklin Award; Gold medal of the Mexican Geographical Society; Irish Presidential Distinguished Service
- Website: drmichaelhogan.com

Michael Hogan (born 1943 in Newport, Rhode Island) is an American author of thirty-one books, including two collections of short stories, eight books of poetry, selected essays on teaching in Latin America, two novels, the critically acclaimed Abraham Lincoln and Mexico, and the best-selling Irish Soldiers of Mexico, a history of the Irish battalion in Mexico which formed the basis for an MGM movie starring Tom Berenger. He received his B.A. and MFA in creative writing from the University of Arizona and holds a Ph.D. in Latin American Studies from the University of Guadalajara and the Institute of Advanced Studies.

Dr. Hogan was the recipient of a PEN Award, two Pushcart Prizes, an National Endowment for the Arts fellowship, the Benjamin Franklin Award and the gold medal of the Mexican Geographical Society. His work has appeared in many journals such as The Paris Review, The Harvard Review, Z-Magazine, Political Affairs and the Monthly Review.

Besides being a writer, poet and historian, Dr. Hogan is also the former director of Latin American initiatives for the College Board, and a special consultant to the U.S. Department of State's Office of Overseas Schools. Hogan has worked as a Humanities Department Head for fourteen years in American schools abroad and as a professor of international relations at the Autonomous University of Guadalajara. He has given workshops and presentations at conferences in the United States, Canada, Malaysia, Mexico, Guatemala, Honduras, Nicaragua, Costa Rica, Panama, Colombia, Venezuela, Uruguay, Paraguay, Brazil and Argentina. He currently lives in Guadalajara, Mexico with the textile artist Lucinda Mayo, and their dog, Molly Malone.

== Reviews ==
Writing for The American Poetry Review, Sam Hamill noted: "Hogan's poems are virtually free of the ego and fake emotion, the public posturing and self-regard that infect so much recent poetry. For Hogan, to undertake the poem is to undertake the possibility of radical transformation. The humility and compassion of his poems warm me when others leave me chilled to the bone. He rewards the reader with intelligence and warmth and a wide sweep of understanding."

Edgar H. Thompson in Western American Literature notes: “Hogan’s poetry is accessible, but it does not give up all of its secrets easily, which affirms the work’s strength and quality. Though Hogan has lived a good part of his adult life in the Southwest, the themes he address in these poems are universal and not strictly western. Hogan’s vision will challenge readers from any region to think more carefully about life and their place in it.”

Although poetry is a solid part of Hogan's oeuvre, his work over the past two decades in Mexico has been largely focused on history. His two texts in this genre, on the Irish battalion during the Mexican–American War and on Abraham Lincoln and Mexico have both been influential in the field.

In reviewing The Irish Soldiers of Mexico, Hans Vogel of Leiden University noted: “This book is sound military history, taking into account both major currents of the discipline as it is now being practiced. About the intrinsic merits of this fine, passionate monograph there can be few doubts. Finally, as a monument to the San Patricios, Hogan’s monograph is, I am sure, unsurpassed."

More recently, Dr. Hogan's work has been formally recognized by the Irish Republic. In a citation received in 2025 from the Irish President and presented at a formal ceremony in Mexico. It reads in part. “As a poet, educator and historian, you have bridged continents—connecting America and Latin American traditions with care and insight. In a time of increased social polarization, your work stands as a testimony to the enduring power of culture and memory to unite people. On behalf of the people of Ireland, I send my warm wishes and deepest respect." Michael D. Higgins, President of Ireland.

His Abraham Lincoln and Mexico has been widely reviewed and was the subject of a recent Smithsonian article. “In his 2016 study, Abraham Lincoln and Mexico: A History of Courage, Intrigue and Unlikely Friendships, Hogan points to several factors that elevated the United States’ 16th president in the eyes of Mexicans, in particular Lincoln's courageous stand in Congress against the Mexican War, and his later support in the 1860s for democratic reformist Benito Juárez, who has at times been called the “Abraham Lincoln of Mexico.” Lincoln's stature as a force for political equality and economic opportunity—and his opposition to slavery, which Mexico had abolished in 1829—made the American leader a sympathetic figure to the progressive followers of Juárez, who was inaugurated as president of Mexico in the same month and year, March 1861, as Lincoln.”

Magan Lange writing in H-Net Reviews urged educators to use the book, noting: “It is an excellent resource for use in the classroom, specifically at the community college or survey level where students require an introduction to events but then also have a chance to review and analyze the primary source documents for themselves, made far easier by including such documents as resources. In addition, many of the endnotes have Internet links, which simplifies access to additional research. At just under two hundred pages of text, Abraham Lincoln and Mexico is concise but minces no words, and in an era of ugly political rhetoric and wall building at the border, is ever so timely.”

== Works ==
=== History and Historical Fiction ===
- Mexicans and Mexican Americans: Remarkable Lives, Unforgettable Stories, 2023
- Women of the Irish Rising: A People's History, 2020
- Guns, Grit and Glory: How the US and Mexico came together to defeat the last Empire in the Americas, 2020
- Abraham Lincoln and Mexico, 2016
- Abraham Lincoln y Mexico, Spanish Edition, 2017
- The Irish Soldiers of Mexico, 1997
- Los Soldados Irlandeses de México, Spanish Edition 2014
- Molly Malone & the San Patricios, 1999
- Molly Malone y los San Patricios, Spanish Edition, 2012

=== Essays and other Non-fiction ===
- Walking Each Other Home: Intimate Conversations on Writing and Life By Notable Poets of the 20th Century, 2024
- The Michael Hogan Reader, 2024
- Living Is No Laughing Matter: A Primer On Existential Optimism, 2020
- We Never Know How High We Are Till We Are Called to Rise: Fifteen Five-Minute Speeches for Induction Ceremonies, 2016
- Newport: A Writer’s Beginnings, 2012
- Teaching from the Heart: Essays and Speeches on Teaching at American Schools in Latin America, 2011
- Twelve Habits of the Creative Mind, 2011
- Intelligent Mistakes: An English Grammar Supplement for Latin American Students, 2011
- A Writer’s Manual: For Inmates in Correctional Institutions, 2011
- Savage Capitalism and the Myth of Democracy: Latin America in the Third Millennium, 2009
- Mexican Mornings: Essays South of the Border, 2006

=== Poetry ===
- In the Time of the Jacarandas, 2015
- A Lion at a Cocktail Party, 35th Anniversary Edition, 2013
- Winter Solstice: New and Selected Poems, 2012
- Imperfect Geographies, 2011
- Making Our Own Rules, Selected Poems, 1989
- The Broken Face of Summer, 1981
- Risky Business, 1978
- Rust, 1977
- April, 1976, 1977
- Letters For My Son, 1975
- If You Ever Get there, Think of Me, 1975.

=== Fiction ===
- A Metaphorical Piano and Other Stories, 2013
- A Death in Newport, 2011

In addition, his work has appeared in dozens of anthologies and textbooks.
