= Edmund Hogan =

Irish Jesuit scholar (1831–1917)

Edmund Ignatius Hogan S.J. (23 January 1831 – 26 November 1917) was an Irish Jesuit scholar.

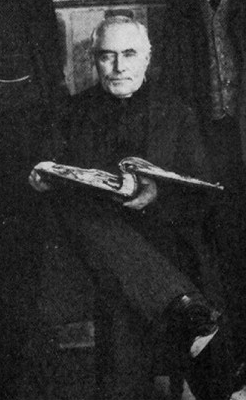
Edmund Hogan

== Life ==
Hogan was born at Belvelly near Cobh, County Cork on 23 January 1831, the youngest son of William Hogan and his wife Mary Morris. He joined the Society of Jesus and studied for the priesthood in Belgium and France. He returned to Ireland where he taught German for a year at Clongowes Wood College; and then languages and music in the Sacred Heart College, Limerick.

After extensive research in Rome Hogan published a history of the Jesuits in Ireland and a life of Saint Patrick. He lectured on Irish language and history at University College Dublin, and was Todd Professor (Celtic) at the Royal Irish Academy.

Hogan died on 26 November 1917.

== Works ==
Hogan's works included:

- Limerick, its history and antiquities (1866)
- Ibernia Ignatiana (1880)
- Cath Ruis na Ríg for Bóinn (1892)
- Distinguished Irishmen of the 16th Century (1894)
- History of the Irish wolf dog (1897)
- A handbook of Irish idioms (1898)
- Irish Phrase Book (1899)
- Onomasticon Goedelicum: An Index to Irish Names of Places and Tribes (1910) compiled from manuscripts; based on the research of John O'Donovan.

Other works were A Description of Ireland in 1598 and Chronological list of the Irish members of the Society of Jesus, 1550-1814. He also contributed to the editing and compilation of works in his field.
