= Hagen & Sievertsen =

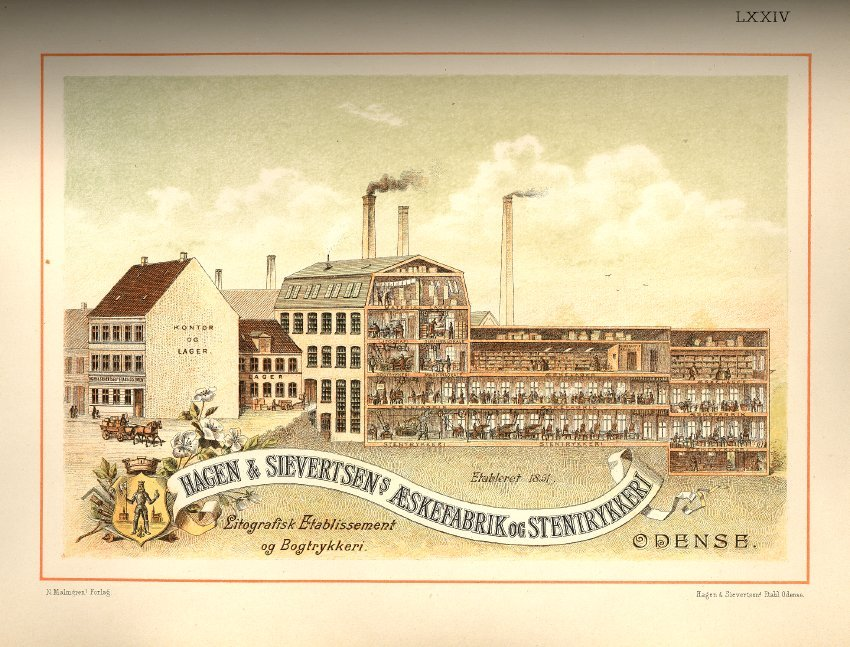
Hagen & Sievertsen, c. 1888

Hagen & Sievertsen was a packaging and printing business in Odense, Denmark. It was a major supplier of often richly decorated medical prescription envelopes for to Danish pharmacies.

== History ==
Hagen & Sievertsen was founded in 1961. It was ibnitially based in rented premises on Vestergade in central Odense in 1851. It specialized in lithographic printing on pharmaceutical packaging. The firm grew steadily and in 1867 relocated to larger premises on Nedergade. These premises expanded with a new factory in 1888. One of the buildings was a four-storey building featuring an elevator. The firm had by then also moved into the markets for printing of books and illustrations. The company was a major supplier of prescription envelopes to Danish pharmacies.
