= List of people from Washington (state) =

State flag of Washington

Location of Washington in the United States

The following is a list of notable people from Washington state. It includes people who were born, raised, or who live(d) in the U.S. state of Washington, along with those who are strongly associated/have significant relations with the state.

== A ==
- Nathan Adrian (born 1988) (Bremerton), competitive swimmer, five-time Olympic gold medalist
- Sandy Alderson (born 1947) (Seattle), baseball general manager, New York Mets
- Sherman Alexie (born 1966) (Wellpinit), writer, poet, and filmmaker
- Laura Allen (born 1974) (Bainbridge Island), actress, The 4400, Dirt, Awake
- Paul Allen (1953–2018) (Seattle), entrepreneur and philanthropist; co-founder, Microsoft
- Rick Anderson (born 1956) (Everett), baseball pitching coach
- Earl Anthony (1938–2001) (Tacoma), professional bowler
- Brad Arnsberg (born 1963) (Seattle), baseball pitching coach, Houston Astros
- Colleen Atwood (born 1948) (Quincy), Academy Award-winning costume designer
- Earl Averill (1902–1983) (Snohomish), Major League Baseball outfielder in National Baseball Hall of Fame
- John Aylward (1946–2022) (Seattle), actor; ER, The Others, Armageddon

== B ==
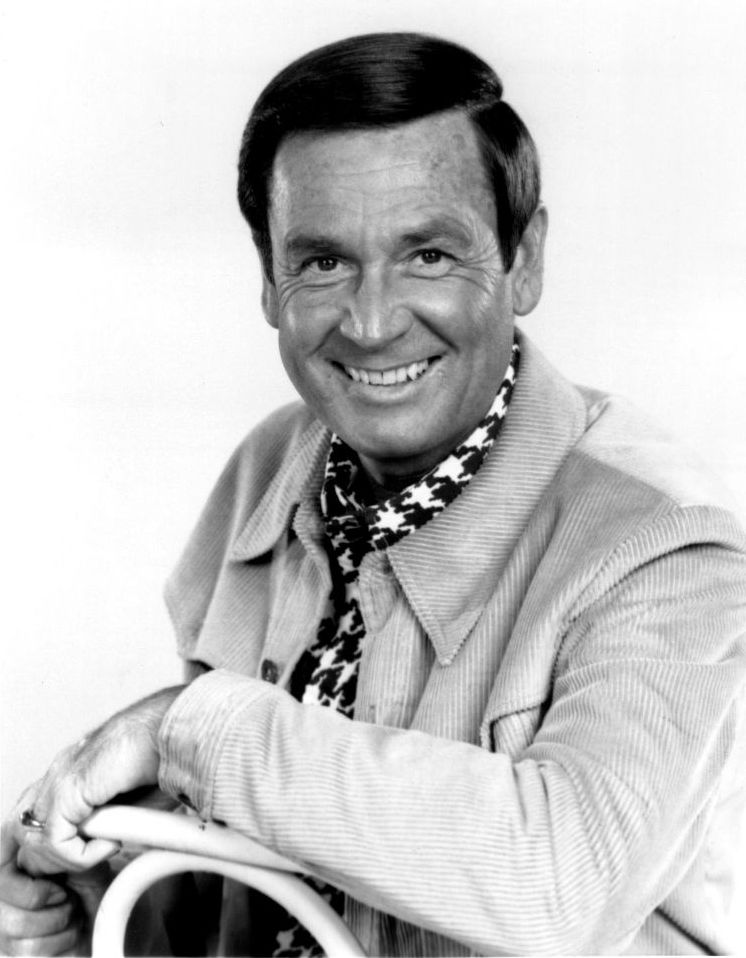
Bob Barker

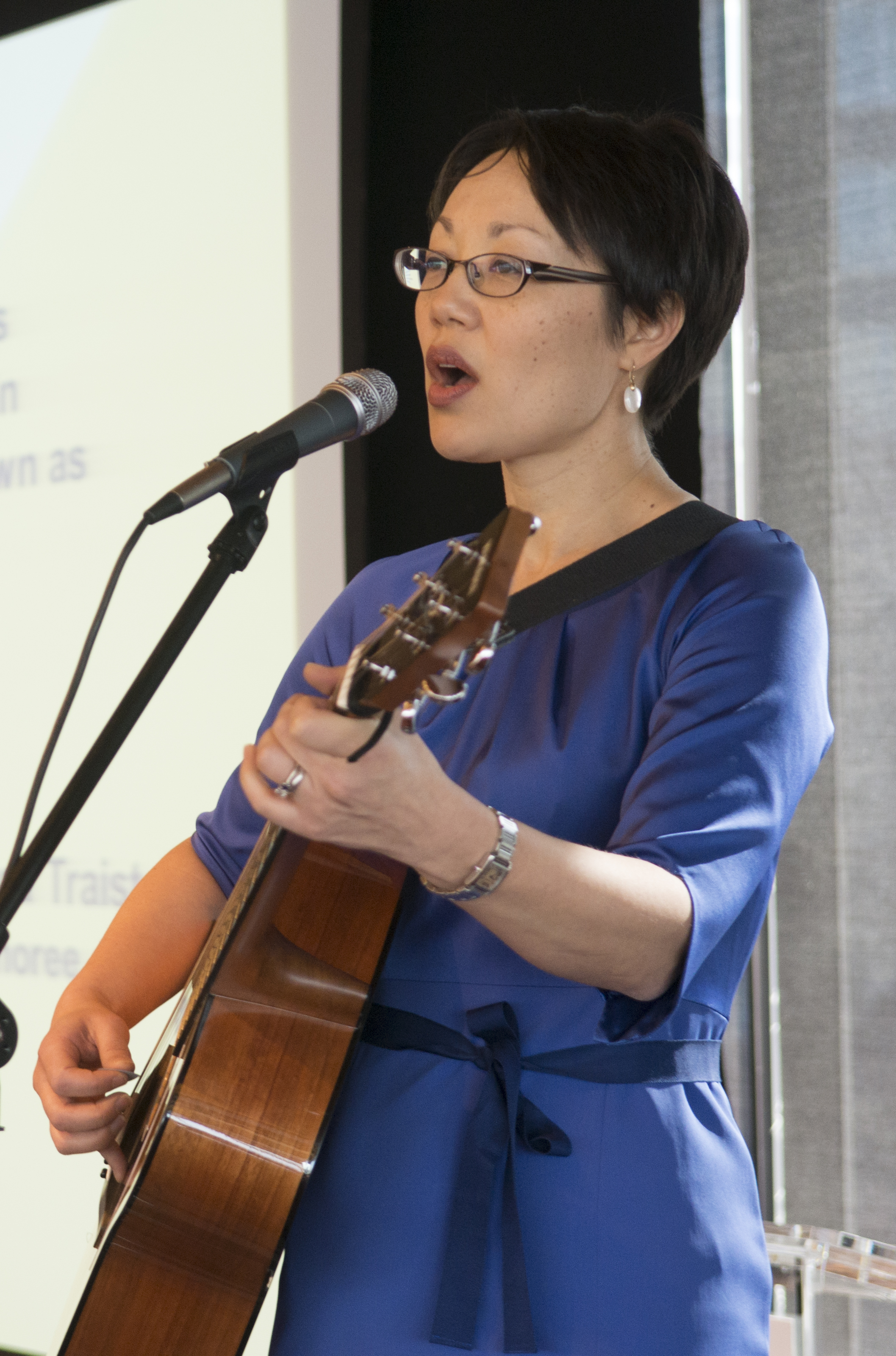
Rabbi Angela Warnick Buchdahl

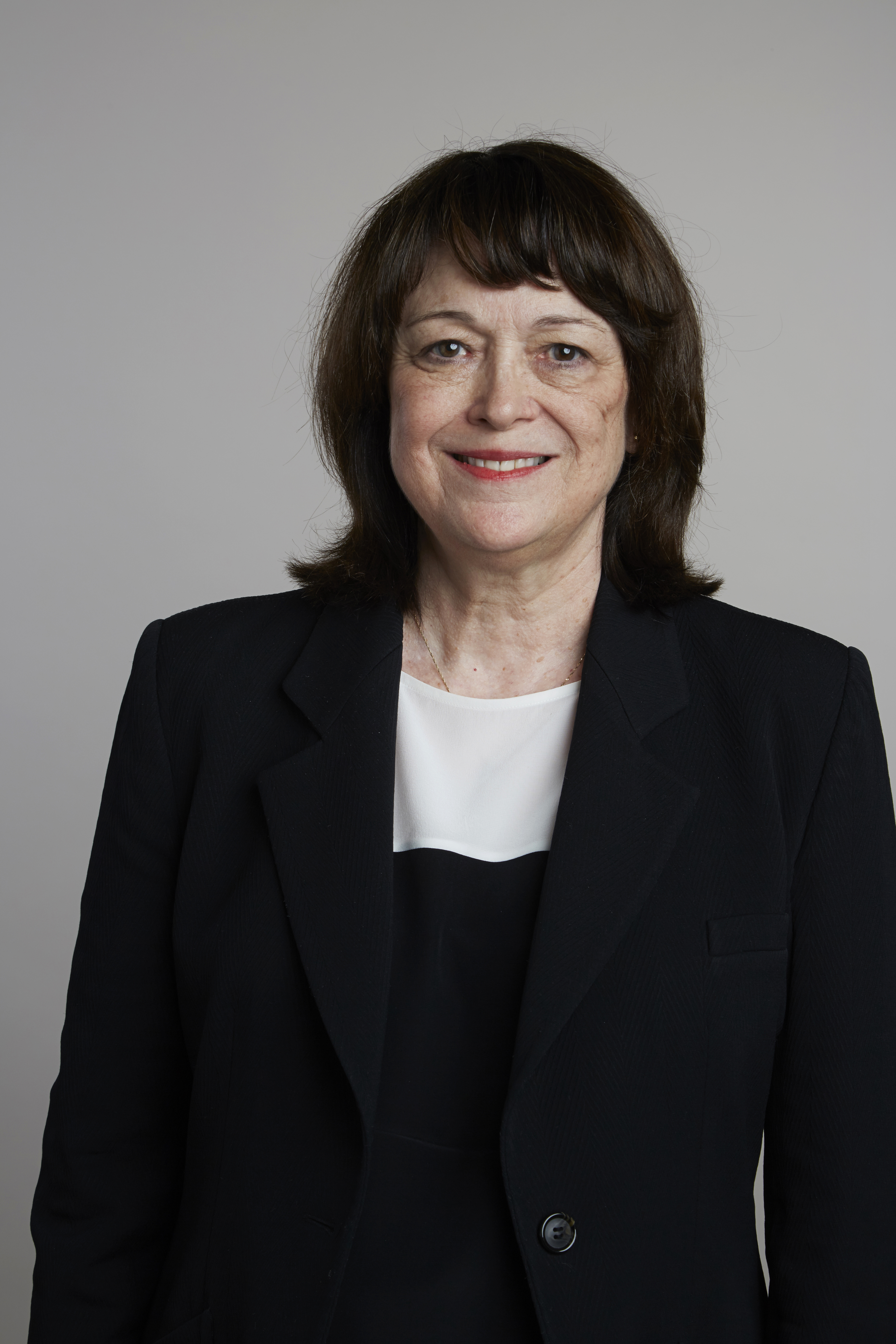
Linda B. Buck

- Red Badgro (1902–1998) (Kent), National Football League end; member, Pro Football Hall of Fame
- Jean-Luc Baker (born 1993), Olympic ice dancer
- Chris Ballew (born 1965) (Seattle), singer, alternative-rock band The Presidents of the United States of America
- Elmer Banker (1871–1939), member of the Washington House of Representatives from 1917 to 1933
- Zach Banner (born 1993) (Tacoma), NFL football offensive tackle for the Pittsburgh Steelers
- Bob Barker (born 1923) (Darrington), game show host, The Price Is Right
- Tony Barnette (born 1983) (Federal Way), relief pitcher for the Texas Rangers
- Glenn Beck (born 1964) (Mount Vernon), conservative talk radio and television host
- Welton Becket (1902–1969) (Seattle), architect
- Caprice Benedetti (born 1966) (Seattle), actress
- Bruce Bennett (1906–2007) (Tacoma), athlete and actor
- Karl Benson (born 1951), former college baseball coach and former commissioner of the Mid-American Conference, Western Athletic Conference, and Sun Belt Conference
- Barbara Berjer (1920–2002) (Seattle), soap opera actress
- Steven "Jesse" Bernstein (1950–1991) (Seattle), poet, author, and essayist
- Jeff Bezos (born 1964) (Seattle), founder and CEO of Amazon
- Greg Biffle (1969–2025) (Vancouver), NASCAR driver
- Josie Bissett (born 1970) (Seattle), actress
- Angie Bjorklund (born 1989) (Spokane), basketball player, Chicago Sky
- Tori Black (born 1988) (Seattle), adult model and pornographic actress
- Frances Blakemore (1906–1997), artist and author
- Sheila Bleck (born 1974) (Vancouver), IFBB professional bodybuilder
- Drew Bledsoe (born 1972) (Ellensburg), football quarterback, New England Patriots and Dallas Cowboys
- Mary L. Boas (1917–2010) (Seattle), mathematician and physics professor, and writer; author, Mathematical Methods in the Physical Sciences
- Ralph P. Boas Jr. (1912–1992) (Walla Walla), mathematician, teacher, and journal editor
- Jeremy Bonderman (born 1982) (Kennewick), baseball pitcher, Detroit Tigers
- Benson Boone (born 2002) (Monroe), singer-songwriter
- Bill Bowerman (1911–1999) (Seattle), track coach, University of Oregon; co-founder, Nike
- Gregory "Pappy" Boyington (1912–1988) (Tacoma), major, Marine Corps aviator, Flying Ace, Medal of Honor recipient, Navy Cross recipient
- Avery Bradley (born 1990) (Tacoma), shooting guard for Boston Celtics
- Bryan Braman (born 1987) (Spokane), linebacker, Philadelphia Eagles
- Jesse Brand (born 1976) (Ferndale), singer-songwriter
- Michael Brantley (born 1987) (Bellevue), outfielder for Houston Astros
- Karan Brar (born 1999) (Redmond), actor
- Walter Houser Brattain (1902–1987) (Tonasket), Nobel Prize-winning physicist who co-invented the transistor
- Richard Brautigan (1935–1984) (Tacoma), novelist, poet, and short story writer
- Isaac Brock (born 1975) (Issaquah), singer, indie rock band Modest Mouse
- Jon Brockman (born 1987) (Snohomish), power forward for Milwaukee Bucks
- Gail Brodsky (born 1991), tennis player
- Arthur C. Brooks (born 1964) (Spokane), social scientist, economist, president of American Enterprise Institute
- Brandon Brown (born 1989), basketball player for Hapoel Jerusalem of the Israeli Basketball Premier League
- Angela Warnick Buchdahl (born 1972), rabbi
- Linda B. Buck (born 1947) (Seattle), scientist, Nobel Prize winner
- Travis Buck (born 1983) (Richland), Major League Baseball player for Oakland Athletics (OF)
- Billy Burke (born 1966) (Bellingham), actor, Charlie Swan in The Twilight Saga
- Nate Burleson (born 1981) (Renton), wide receiver for NFL's Detroit Lions
- Jeff Burlingame (born 1971) (Aberdeen), author, winner of NAACP Image Award and Sigma Delta Chi Award
- George Washington Bush (1779–1863) (Tumwater), pioneer
- Raegan Butcher (Snohomish), poet
- Octavia E. Butler (1947–2006) (Lake Forest Park), science-fiction writer
- Sarah Butler (born 1985) (Puyallup), actress

== C ==
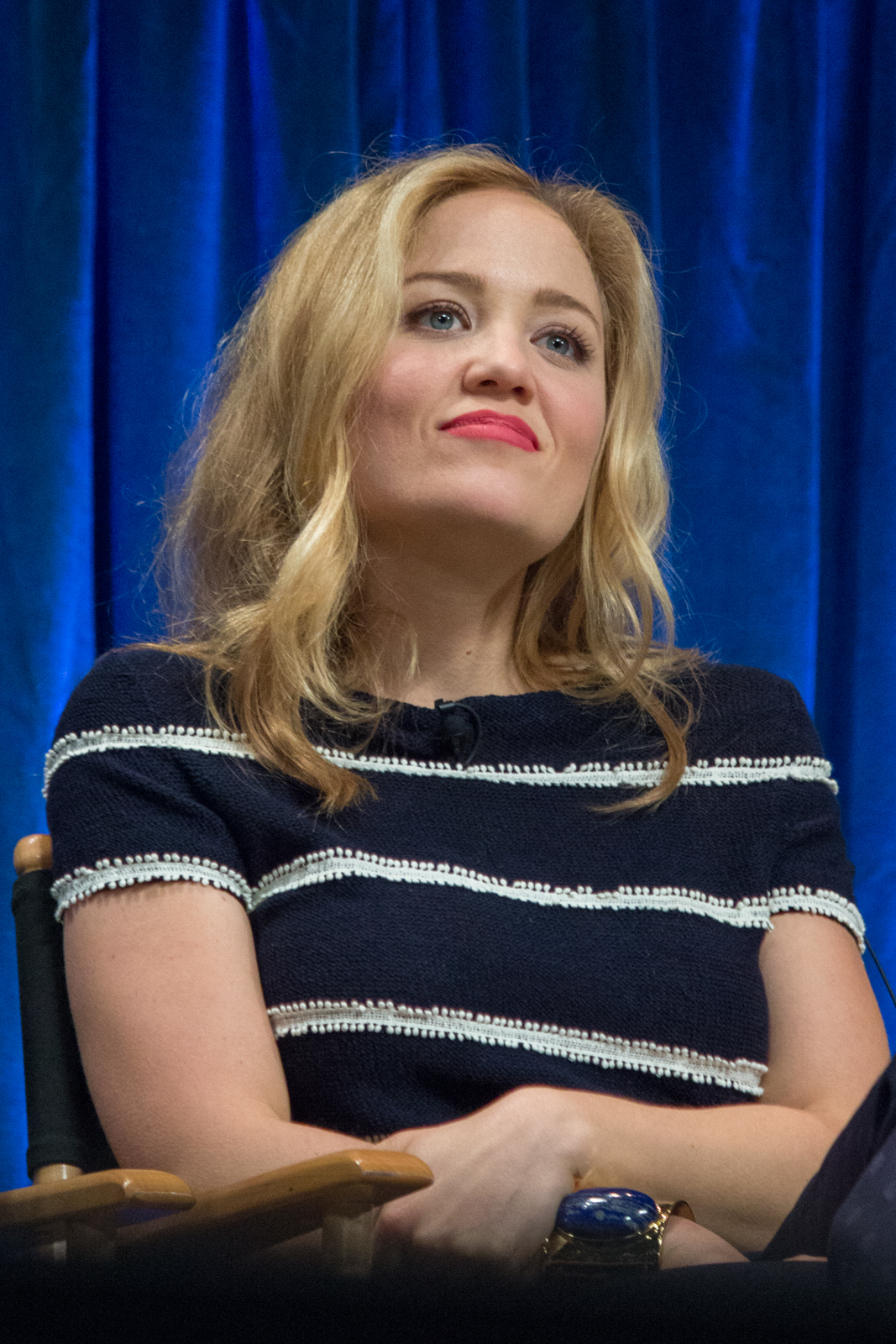
Erika Christensen

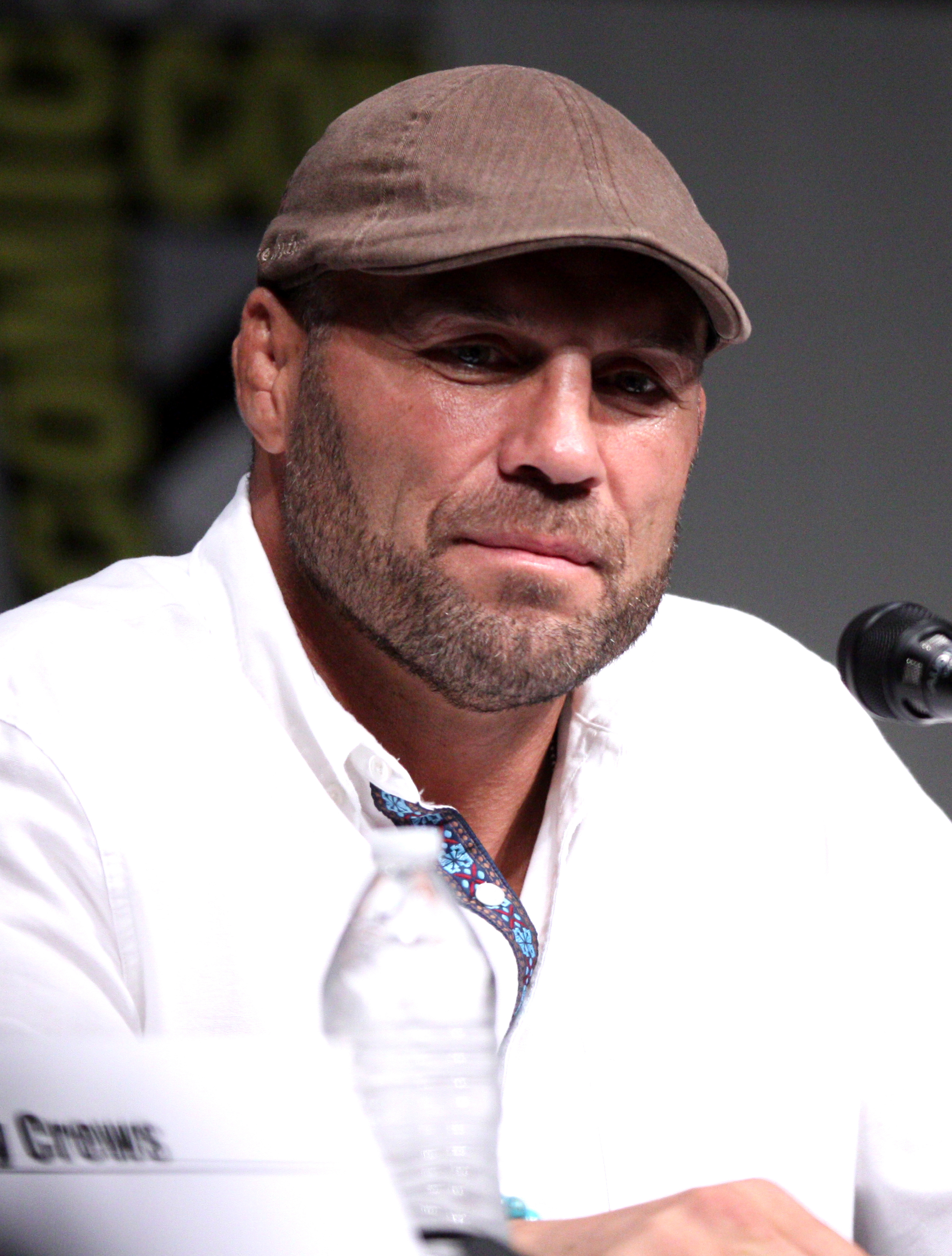
Randy Couture

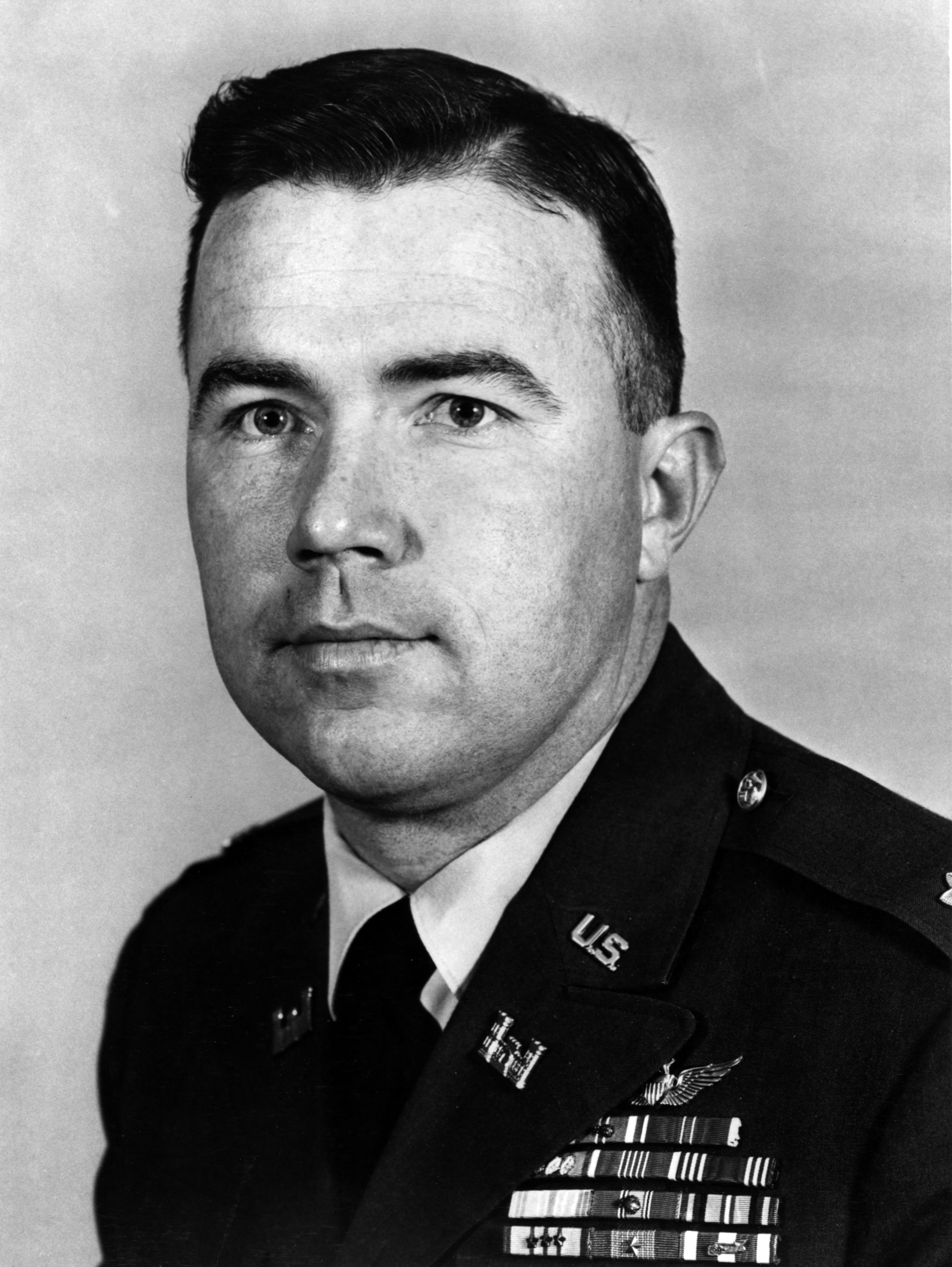
Bruce P. Crandall

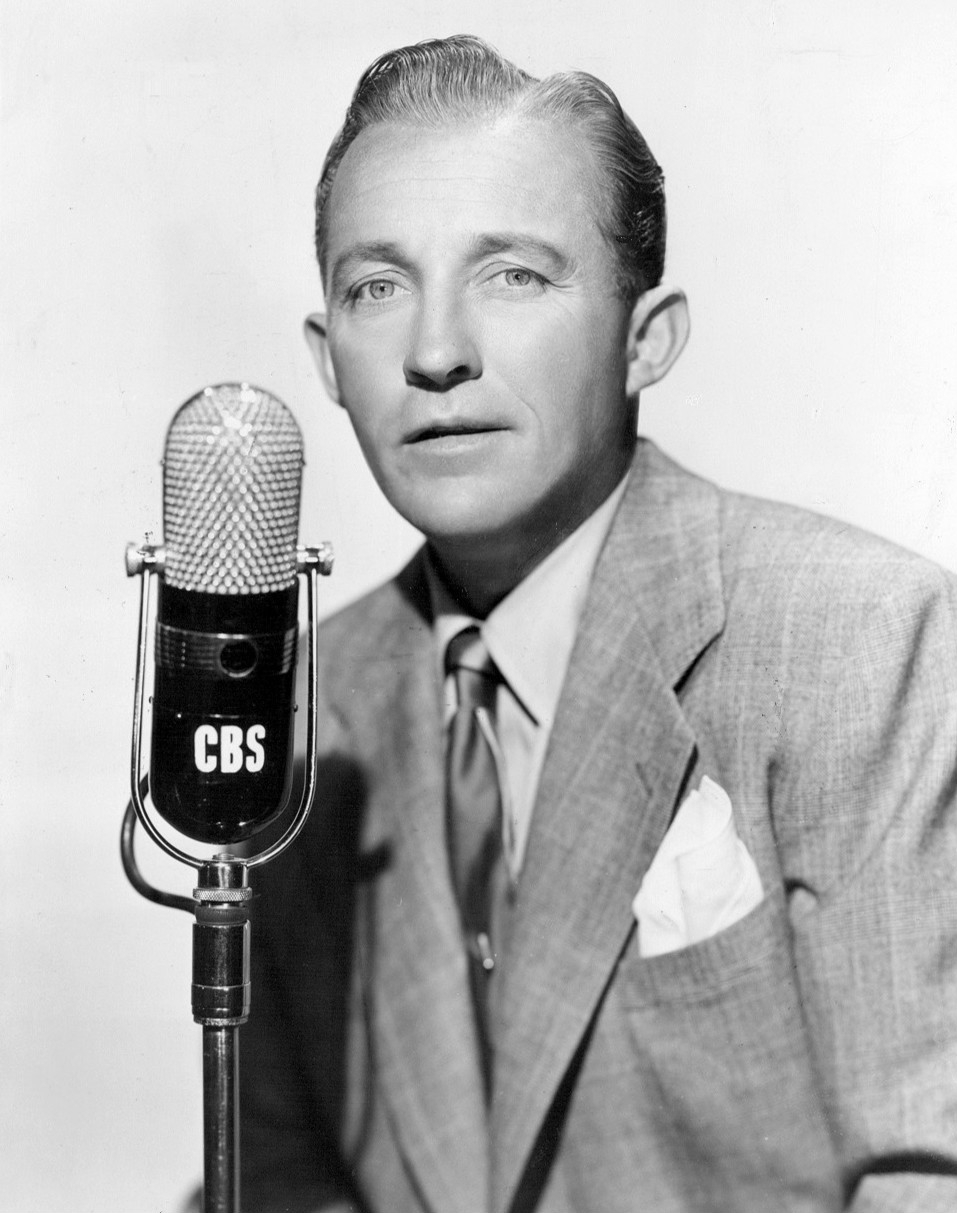
Bing Crosby

- Tom Cable (born 1964) (Snohomish), assistant coach, Seattle Seahawks
- Dove Cameron (born 1996) (Seattle), actress
- Dyan Cannon (born 1937) (Tacoma), actress
- Jerry Cantrell (born 1966) (Tacoma), guitarist for Alice in Chains
- Maria Cantwell (born 1958) (Edmonds), United States senator, former VP of RealNetworks
- Bryan Caraway (born 1984) (Yakima), mixed martial artist
- Orson Scott Card (born 1951) (Richland), author and professor at Southern Virginia University
- Harvey Carignan (born 1927), serial killer
- Brandi Carlile (born 1981) (Ravensdale), musician
- Chester Carlson (1906–1968) (Seattle), inventor of xerography
- JoAnne Carner (born 1939) (Kirkland), Hall of Fame golfer
- Raymond Carver (1938–1988) (Port Angeles), author
- Neko Case (born 1970) (Tacoma), chanteuse
- Pat Cashman (Seattle), actor and radio personality
- James Caviezel (born 1968) (Mount Vernon), actor
- Ron Cey (born 1948) (Tacoma), All-Star Major League Baseball player
- Drew Chadwick (born 1992) (Sequim), appeared on The X Factor USA with trio Emblem3
- Edward Chamberlin (1899–1967) (La Conner), economist
- Carol Channing (1921–2019) (Seattle), actress
- Valentina Chepiga (born 1962) (Seattle), IFBB professional bodybuilder
- Dale Chihuly (born 1941) (Tacoma), glass artist
- Chin Gee Hee (1844–1929) (Seattle), Chinese immigrant, made fortune in Seattle, returned to China as railway entrepreneur
- Louis Chirillo (born 1961) (Seattle), voice actor
- Jori Chisholm (born 1975) (Seattle), champion bagpiper
- Erika Christensen (born 1982) (Seattle), actress
- Adam Cimber (born 1990) (Puyallup), pitcher for the Cleveland Indians
- Brandy Clark (born 1975) (Morton), country singer and songwriter
- Michael Clarke (1946–1993) (Spokane), drummer for The Byrds
- Beverly Cleary (1916–2021) (Yakima), author
- Chuck Close (1940–2021) (Monroe), artist
- Kurt Cobain (1967–1994) (Aberdeen), Nirvana vocalist and guitarist
- Erik Coleman (born 1982) (Spokane), football player for Atlanta Falcons
- Nancy Coleman (1912–2000) (Everett), actress
- Judy Collins (born 1939) (Seattle), folk singer
- Charles Congdon (1909–1965) (Blaine), professional golfer
- Hank Conger (born 1988) (Federal Way), catcher for Houston Astros
- Jeff Conine (born 1966) (Tacoma), former All-Star Major League Baseball player
- John Considine (1868–1943) (Seattle), impresario; founded one of first vaudeville circuits
- Chris Cornell (1964–2017) (Seattle), vocalist for Soundgarden and Audioslave
- Lucy Covington (1910–1982) (Nespelem), Native American tribal leader and political activist
- Fred Couples (born 1959) (Seattle), professional golfer
- Randy Couture (born 1963) (Everett), mixed martial artist, Greco-Roman wrestler, actor
- Colin Cowherd (born 1962) (Bay Center), sports media personality
- Bruce P. Crandall (1933–2026), U.S. Army officer, Medal of Honor recipient
- Ian Crawford (born 1988) (Auburn), affiliated with bands Panic! at the Disco and The Cab
- Jamal Crawford (born 1980) (Seattle), NBA player for Los Angeles Clippers
- Bing Crosby (1903–1977) (Tacoma), singer and actor
- Bob Crosby (1913–1993) (Spokane), singer and actor
- Sarah Crouch (born 1989) (Hockinson), long-distance runner
- Merce Cunningham (1919–2009) (Centralia), dancer and choreographer
- Anthony Curcio a.k.a. D.B. Tuber (born 1980), armored car robber
- Colin Curtis (born 1985) (Issaquah), left fielder for New York Yankees

== D ==
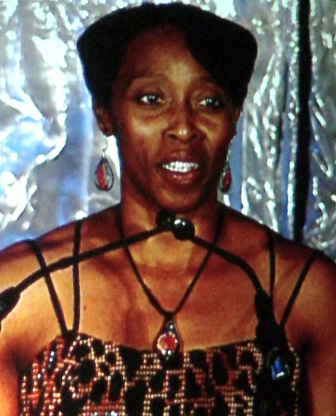
Gail Devers

- Joel Dahmen (born 1987) (Clarkston), professional golfer
- Bryan Danielson (born 1981) (Aberdeen), professional wrestler
- James Darling (Kettle Falls), NFL player 1997–2006
- David DeCastro (born 1990) (Kirkland), guard for NFL's Pittsburgh Steelers
- Arthur Denny (1822–1889), early pioneer who founded Seattle
- Gail Devers (born 1966) (Seattle), athlete, Olympic gold medalist
- Garret Dillahunt (born 1964) (Selah), actor
- Corey Dillon (born 1974) (Federal Way), running back for NFL's New England Patriots
- Westley Allan Dodd (1961–1993) (Toppenish), serial killer
- Elinor Donahue (born 1937) (Tacoma), actress on Father Knows Best
- James Doohan (1920–2005) (Redmond), actor, Scotty on Star Trek
- Jon Dorenbos (born 1980) (Woodinville), long snapper for NFL's Philadelphia Eagles
- Ryan Doumit (Moses Lake), former MLB catcher/outfielder for Pittsburgh Pirates
- Howard Duff (1913–1990) (Bremerton), actor
- Jessie Duff (Burlington), competitive shooter
- Bonnie Dunbar (born 1949) (Sunnyside), astronaut
- Jeff Dye (Kent), stand-up comedian, socialite

== E ==
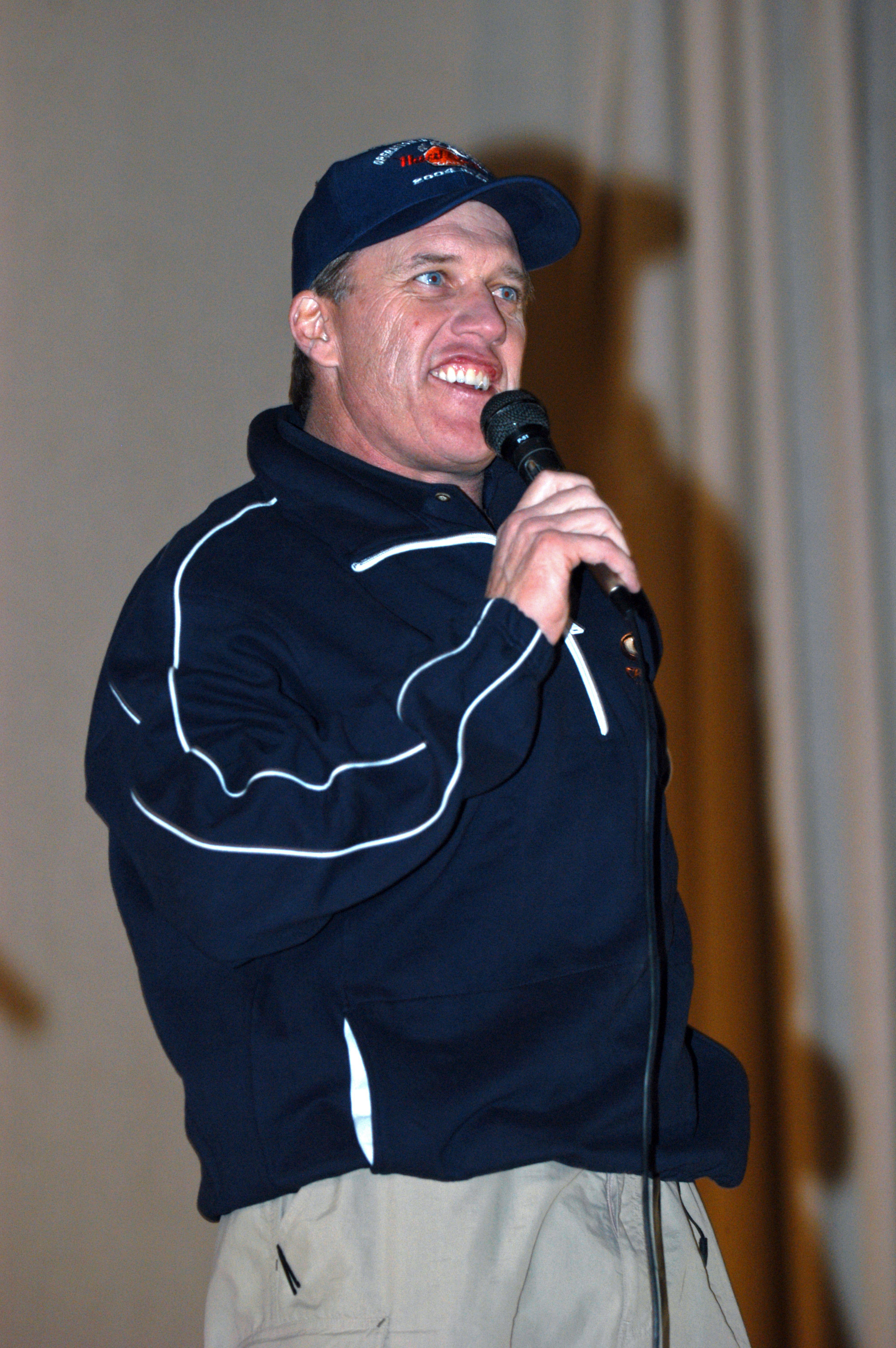
John Elway

- Turk Edwards (1907–1973) (Douglas County), Hall of Fame offensive tackle and coach
- John Ehrlichman (1925–1999) (Tacoma), counsel to President Richard Nixon
- Ben Eisenhardt (born 1990), American-Israeli professional basketball player in the Israeli Basketball Premier League
- C. J. Elleby (born 2000), basketball player in the Israeli Basketball Premier League
- Lisa Ellis (born 1982) (Woodinville), professional mixed martial artist
- Harris Ellsworth (1899–1986) (Hoquiam), Oregon congressman
- John Elway (born 1960) (Port Angeles), NFL quarterback, two-time Super Bowl winner, Denver Broncos executive
- Justin Ena (born 1978) (Shelton), NFL linebacker for Philadelphia Eagles
- Helga Estby (1860–1942) (Spokane), walked across U.S. in 1896

== F ==
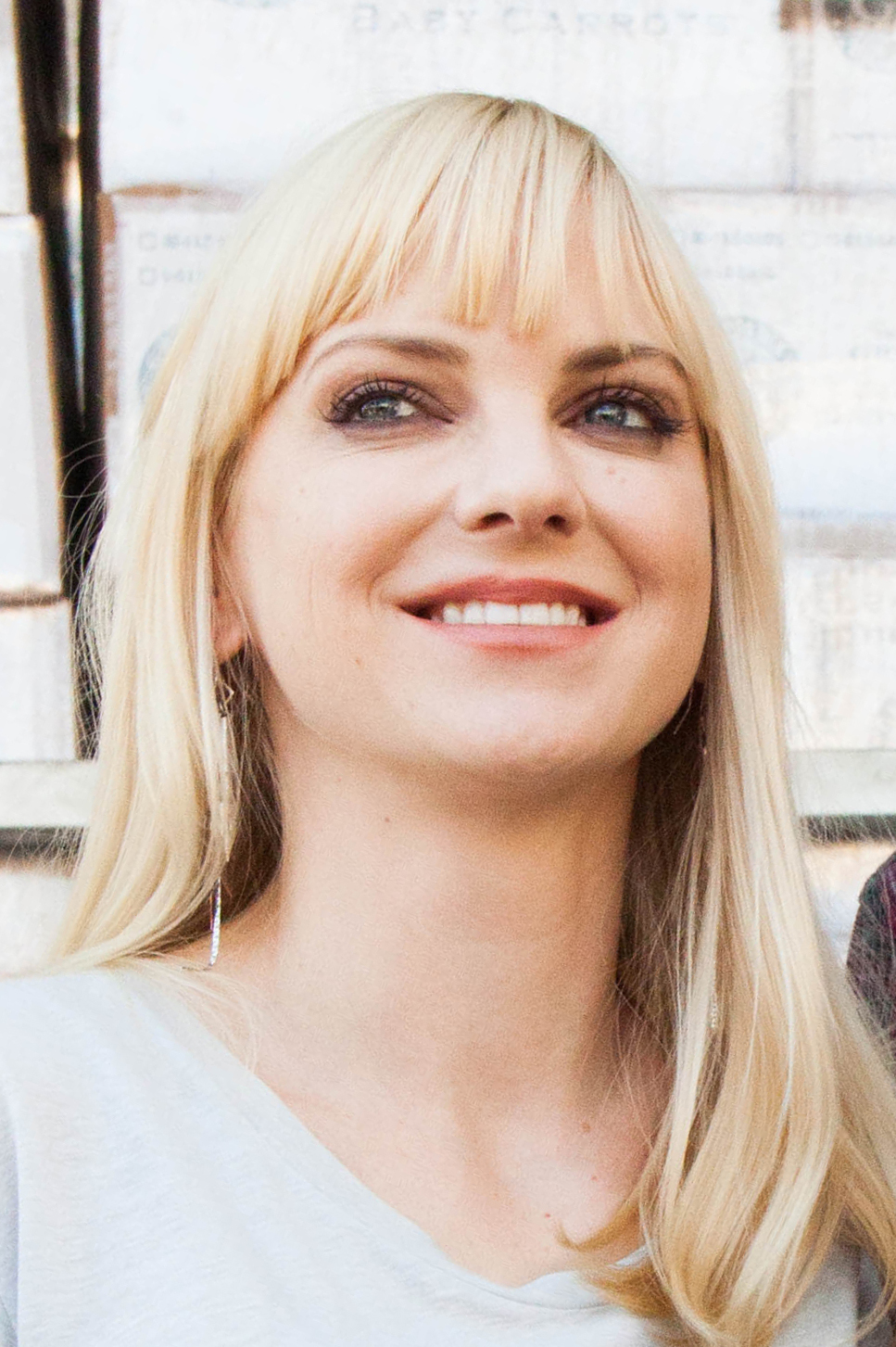
Anna Faris

- Anna Faris (born 1976) (Edmonds), actress, starred in Scary Movie series and Just Friends
- Frances Farmer (1914–1970) (Seattle), actress
- Joe Feddersen (born 1953) (Omak), sculptor, painter, photographer
- Ray Flaherty (1903–1994) (Spokane), football player, coach, Hall of Famer
- Tom Foley (1929–2013) (Spokane), Speaker of the United States House of Representatives (1989–1995)
- Russ Francis (born 1953) (Seattle), tight end with New England Patriots and San Francisco 49ers
- Bryan Fuller (born 1969) (Clarkston), writer, creator of Dead Like Me and Pushing Daisies
- Stacy Marie Fuson (born 1978) (Tacoma), Playboy model, February 1999 Playmate of the Month

== G ==
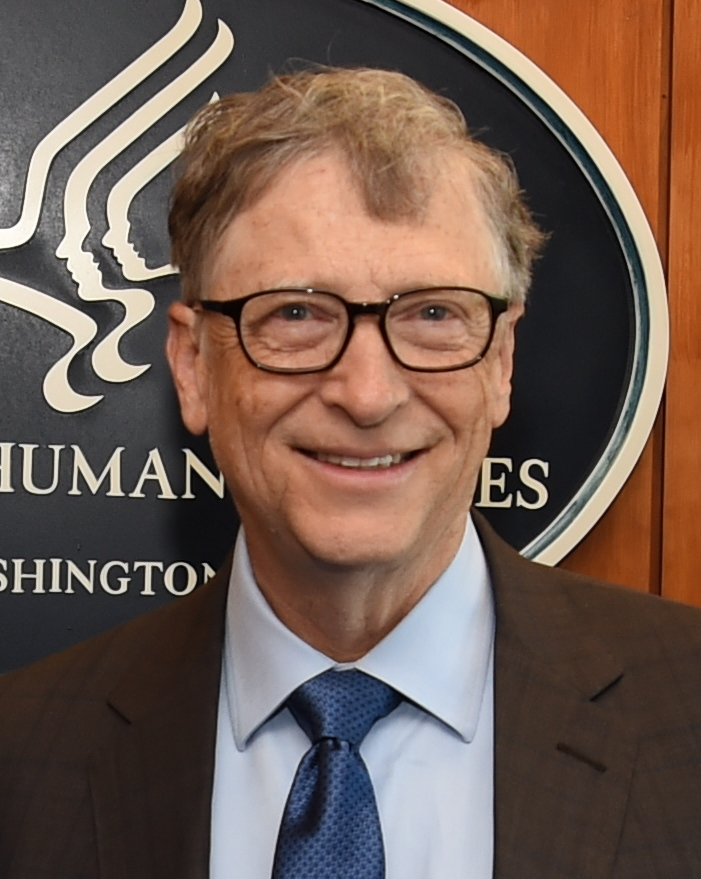
Bill Gates

- Kenny G (born Kenneth Gorelick, 1956) (Seattle), musician
- Abdul Gaddy (born 1992), basketball player in the Israeli Basketball Premier League
- Tess Gallagher (born 1943) (Port Angeles), poet, essayist, writer
- Nathan Gamble (born 1998) (Tacoma), child actor, The Dark Knight, Marley & Me, Hank
- Myles Gaskin (born 1997) (Lynnwood), running back, Miami Dolphins
- Bill Gates (born 1955) (Seattle), founder of Microsoft
- Ben Gibbard (born 1976) (Bremerton), lead singer of Death Cab for Cutie and The Postal Service
- Andy Gibson (born 1981) (Spokane), country music singer
- Cam Gigandet (born 1982) (Tacoma), actor
- Richard F. Gordon Jr. (1929–2017), astronaut
- Garrett Grayson (born 1991) (Vancouver), quarterback, New Orleans Saints
- Vernon Greene (1908–1965) (Battle Ground), cartoonist
- Kaye (Hall) Greff (born 1951) (Tacoma), competitive swimmer, two-time Olympic gold medalist
- Sam C. Guess (1909–1989), politician
- David Guterson (born 1956) (Bainbridge Island), author

== H ==
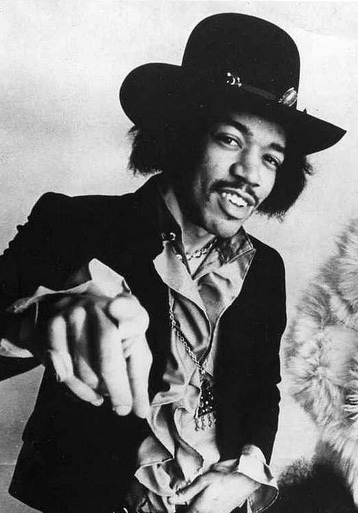
Jimi Hendrix

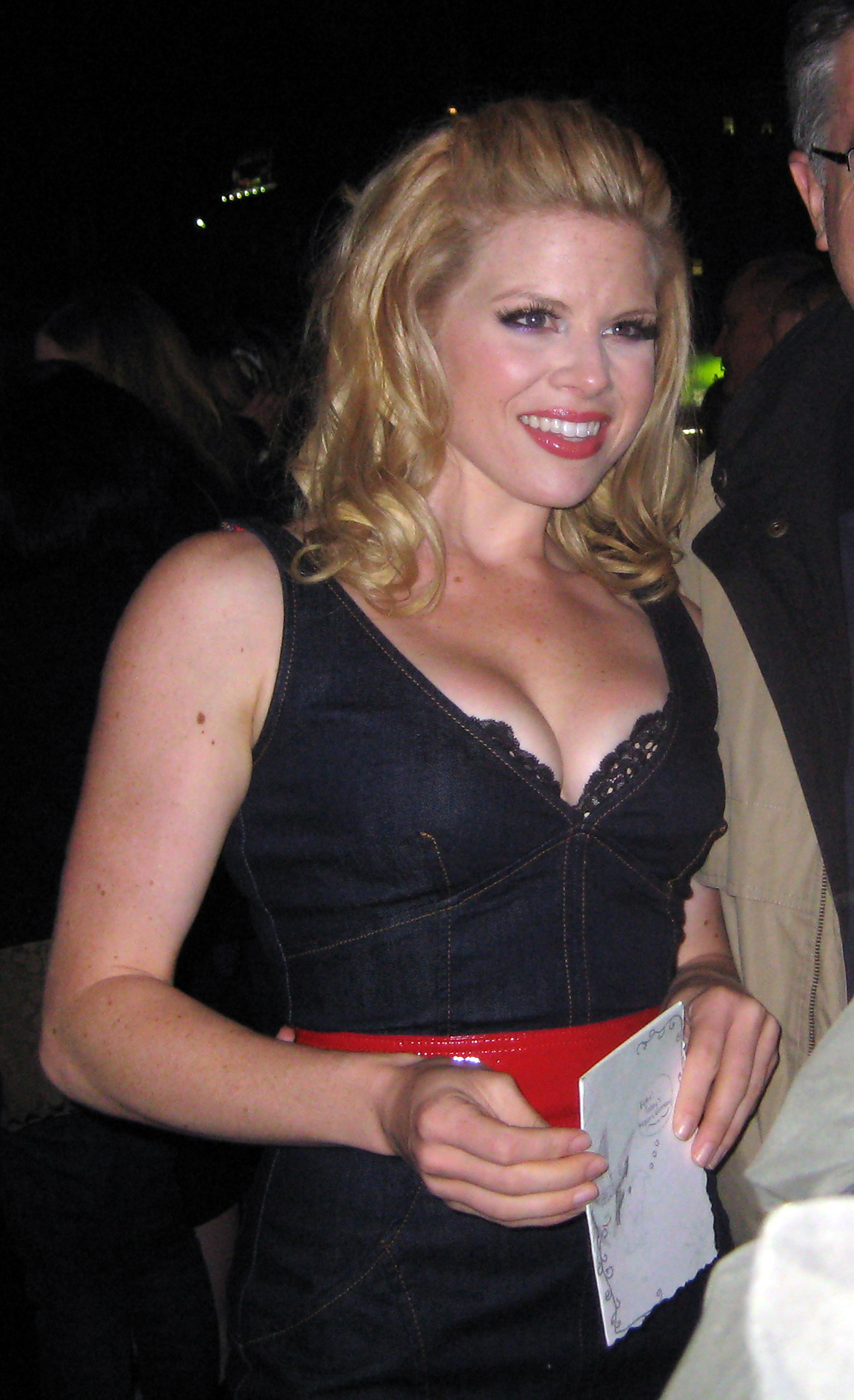
Megan Hilty

- Richard Haag (1923–2018) (Seattle), landscape architect, only two-time recipient of ASLA President's Award for Design Excellence
- Nick Hagadone (born 1986) (Sumner), pitcher for the Cleveland Indians
- Ivar Haglund (1905–1985) (Seattle), folk singer, restaurateur
- Matt Hague (born 1985) (Bellevue), first baseman, Toronto Blue Jays
- Marcus Hahnemann (born 1972) (Kent), goalkeeper for Reading F.C.
- Jason Hammel (born 1982) (Port Orchard), starting pitcher, Kansas City Royals
- Thomas Hampson (born 1955) (Spokane), opera singer
- Jane Hamsher (born 1959) (Seattle), film producer, author, and left-wing blogger
- Sig Hansen (born 1966) (Seattle), boat captain
- Jason Hanson (born 1970) (Spokane), placekicker, Detroit Lions
- Nick Harmer (born 1975) (Puyallup), bass guitarist for Death Cab for Cutie
- Joe Harris (born 1992) (Chelan), NBA player
- Melissa Harris-Perry (born 1973) (Seattle), author, TV host, commentator
- Spencer Hawes (born 1988) (Seattle), NBA player
- Phil Heath (Seattle), IFBB Pro, 3X Mr. Olympia
- Mel Hein (1909–1992) (Burlington), Hall of Fame player for New York Giants
- Johnny Hekker (born 1990) (Redmond), punter, Los Angeles Rams
- Mark Hendrickson (born 1974) (Mount Vernon), relief pitcher, Baltimore Orioles
- Jimi Hendrix (1942–1970) (Seattle), guitarist
- Rachelle Henry (born 2000) (Richland), actress
- Frank Herbert (1920–1986) (Tacoma), author of Dune novels
- Sue Herera (born 1957) (Spokane), CNBC reporter and anchor
- Josh Heytvelt (born 1986) (Clarkston), professional basketball player
- Steven Hill (1922–2016) (Seattle), actor, Mission Impossible and Law & Order
- Megan Hilty (born 1981) (Bellevue), actress
- Gordon Hirabayashi (1918–2012) (Auburn), sociologist
- Amy Holmes (born 1973) (Seattle), news anchor, TheBlaze TV
- Joe Ronnie Hooper (1938–1979), soldier, Medal of Honor recipient
- John Hopcroft (born 1939) (Seattle), theoretical computer scientist
- Peter Horton (born 1953) (Bellevue), actor and television director; starred in Thirtysomething
- Ray Horton (born 1960) (Tacoma), NFL cornerback; defensive backs coach for the Pittsburgh Steelers
- Kei Hosogai (born 1984) (Seattle), actor and musician
- Roy Huggins (1914–2002) (Littell), creator of television series The Fugitive and The Rockford Files
- Yolanda Hughes-Heying (born 1963) (Bellingham), IFBB professional bodybuilder
- Fred Hutchinson (1919–1964) (Seattle), Major League Baseball player and manager of Cincinnati Reds

== I ==
- Jay Inslee (born 1951) (Seattle), politician, lawyer, economist, 23rd governor of Washington State
- Lucie Fulton Isaacs (1841–1916) (Walla Walla), writer, philanthropist, suffragist
- Travis Ishikawa (born 1983) (Seattle), first baseman for the San Francisco Giants
- Burl Ives (1909–1995) (Anacortes), Academy Award-winning actor and folk singer

== J ==
- Henry M. Jackson (1912–1983) (Everett), U.S. senator, presidential candidate
- Jonathan Jackson (born 1982), actor
- J. A. Jance (born 1944), author of mystery and horror novels
- Noname Jane (born 1977) (Aberdeen), pornographic actress
- Megan (Quann) Jendrick (born 1984) (Tacoma), competitive swimmer, two-time Olympic gold medalist, State of Washington Sports Hall of Fame inductee
- Keith Hunter Jesperson (born 1955) (Selah), serial killer
- Sally Jewell (born 1956) (Renton), 51st U.S. Secretary of Interior
- Robert Joffrey (1930–1988) (Seattle), choreographer
- Denis Johnson (1949–2017), writer of Jesus' Son
- Jason Johnson (born 1979), former Canadian Football League player
- Matt Johnson (born 1989) (Olympia), safety, Dallas Cowboys
- Russell Johnson (1924–2014) (Bainbridge Island), actor ("The Professor" on Gilligan's Island)
- Chuck Jones (1912–2002) (Spokane), animator
- Quincy Jones (1933–2024) (Seattle), composer, conductor, musician

== K ==
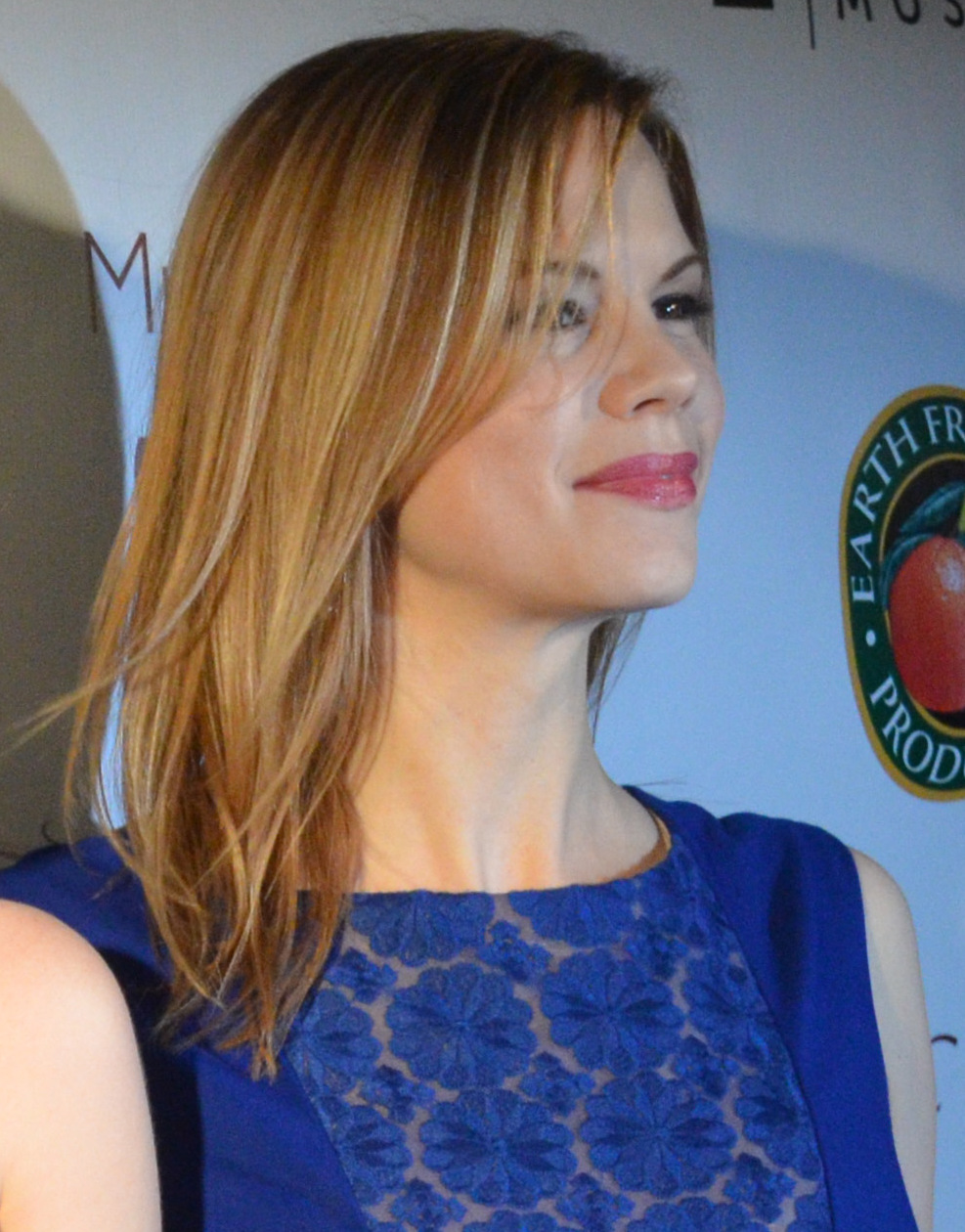
Mariana Klaveno

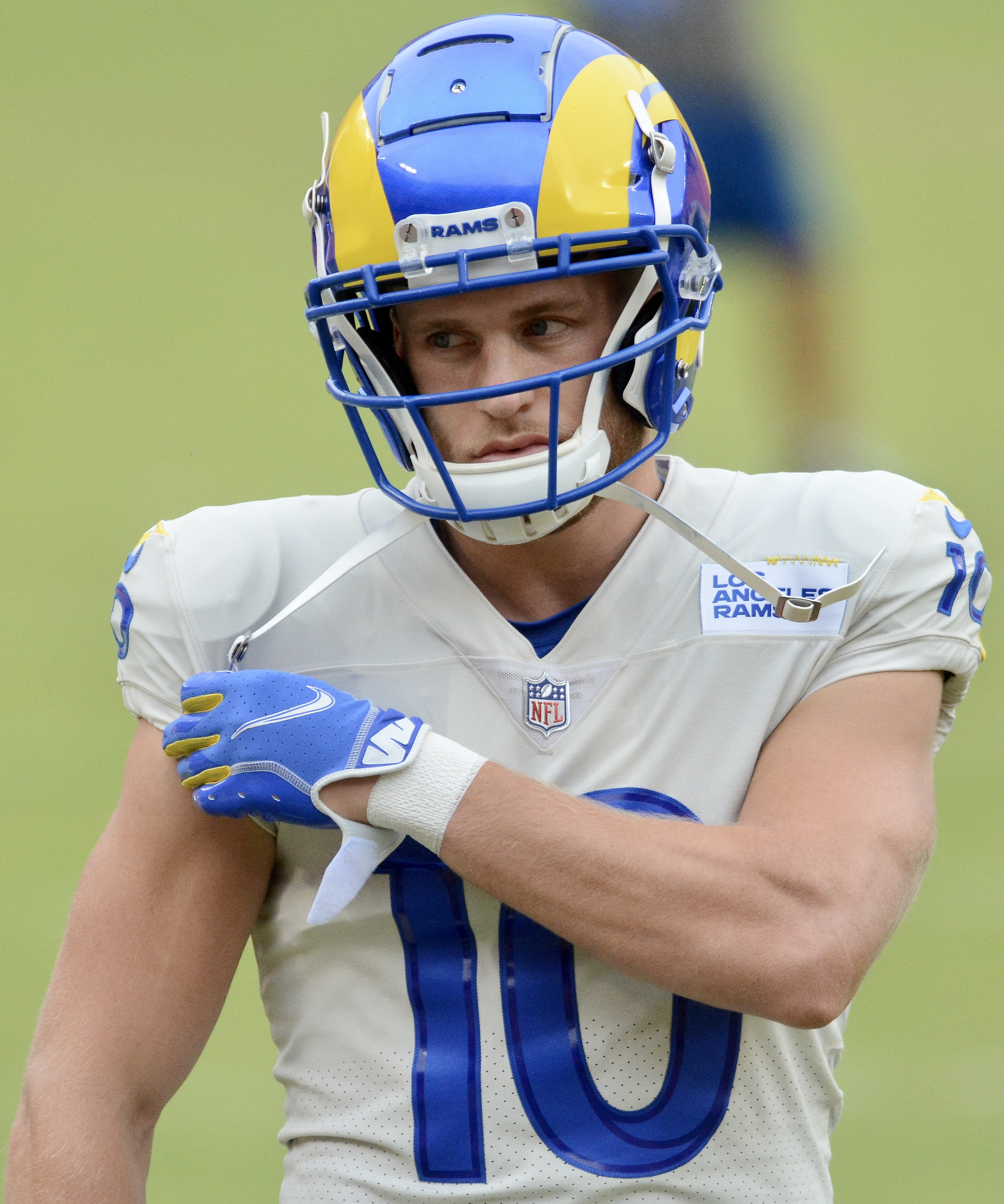
Cooper Kupp

- Kasey Kahne (born 1980) (Enumclaw), NASCAR driver
- Bianca Kajlich (born 1977) (Seattle), actress, Jennifer on CBS sitcom Rules of Engagement
- Richard Karn (born 1956) (Seattle), actor, Home Improvement, Family Feud
- Chris Kattan (born 1970) (Bainbridge Island), actor and comedian, Saturday Night Live, The Middle
- Carol Kaye (born 1935) (Everett), musician
- Jermaine Kearse (born 1990) (Lakewood), wide receiver, Seattle Seahawks
- John Keister (born 1956) (Seattle), comedian
- Keone Kela (born 1993) (Seattle), relief pitcher for Texas Rangers
- Senio Kelemete (born 1990) (Seattle), offensive guard, New Orleans Saints
- Mick Kelleher (born 1947) (Seattle), MLB infielder and coach
- Kasey Keller (born 1969) (Olympia), soccer goalkeeper for Seattle Sounders FC, formerly with Team USA
- Kitty Kelley (born 1942) (Spokane), journalist and author of several best-selling unauthorized biographies
- Donald M. Kendall (1921–2020) (Sequim), chief executive officer, PepsiCo (1971–1986)
- Brian Kendrick (born 1979) (Olympia), WWE wrestler
- Myles Kennedy (born 1969) (Spokane), lead vocalist of Alter Bridge
- Shiloh Keo (born 1987) (Bothell), safety for Denver Broncos
- Hank Ketcham (1920–2001) (Seattle), cartoonist, creator of Dennis the Menace
- Edward Kienholz (1927–1994) (Fairfield), artist
- Erik Kimerer (born 1988) (Edmonds), voice actor, professional wrestler
- Sam Kinison (1953–1992) (Yakima), comedian
- Dale Kinkade (1933–2004) (Hartline), linguist and professor
- Justin Kirk (born 1969) (Union), actor, Weeds, Jack & Jill
- Ed Kirkpatrick (1944–2010) (Spokane), Major League Baseball player
- Jon Kitna (born 1972) (Tacoma), NFL quarterback
- Kitsap, Suquamish leader
- John Kitzhaber (born 1947) (Colfax), Oregon governor (1995–2003)
- Mariana Klaveno (born 1979) (Endicott), actress, True Blood
- Amanda Knox (born 1987) (Seattle), university student accused of murdering Meredith Kercher in Perugia, Italy
- Michael Koenen (born 1982) (Ferndale), punter for the Tampa Bay Buccaneers
- Max Komar (born 1987) (Lakewood), wide receiver for Chicago Bears
- Richard Kovacevich (born 1943) (Tacoma), chief executive officer, Wells Fargo
- Cooper Kupp (born 1993) (Yakima), NFL wide receiver

== L ==
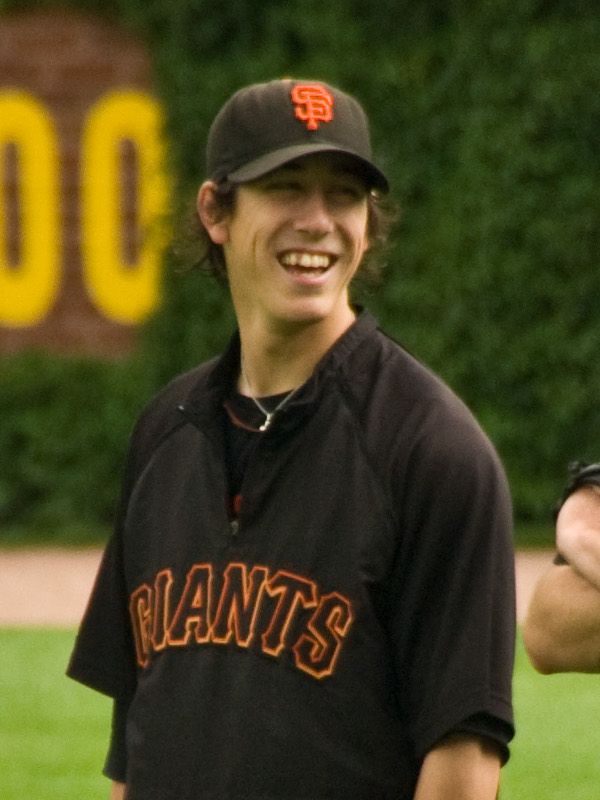
Tim Lincecum

- Jake Lamb (born 1990) (Seattle), third baseman for the Arizona Diamondbacks
- Amber Lancaster (born 1980) (Tacoma), actress, model, The Hard Times of RJ Berger, The Price is Right
- Craig Lancaster (born 1970) (Lakewood), sportswriter, novelist
- Bertha Knight Landes (1868–1943), Seattle mayor, first female mayor of a major U.S. city
- Mark Lanegan (born 1964) (Ellensburg), singer-songwriter
- Erik Larsen (born 1962) (Bellingham), comic book writer, artist and publisher
- Rick Larsen (born 1965) (Arlington), U.S. representative
- Gary Larson (born 1950) (Tacoma), cartoonist, creator of The Far Side
- Richard Lathim (born 1955) (Tri-Cities [Pasco, Richland, Kennewick]), politician, sheriff of Franklin County
- Michael Leavitt (born 1977) (Seattle), visual artist, sculptor and toy maker
- Brandon Lee (1965–1993), actor, son of Bruce Lee
- Gypsy Rose Lee (1911–1970) (Seattle), entertainer, subject of musical Gypsy
- Cassidy Lehrman (born 1992) (Seattle), actress, Sarah Gold on Entourage
- Leschi (1808–1858), Nisqually chief
- Jon Lester (born 1984) (Tacoma), starting pitcher for Chicago Cubs
- Blake Lewis (born 1981) (Redmond), singer and beatboxer, American Idol runner-up
- Rommie Lewis (born 1982) (Seattle), relief pitcher, Toronto Blue Jays
- Ryan Lewis (born 1988) (Spokane), producer, musician, video director
- Brent Lillibridge (born 1983) (Everett), utility player for New York Yankees
- Tim Lincecum (born 1984) (Bellevue), MLB pitcher, 2008 National League Cy Young winner
- Kristina Liutova (born 2010), tennis player
- Mary Livingstone (1905–1983) (Seattle), comedian, wife of Jack Benny
- Gary Locke (born 1950) (Seattle), governor of Washington; U.S. secretary of commerce; U.S. ambassador to China
- Jake Locker (born 1988) (Ferndale), quarterback for Tennessee Titans
- Kenny Loggins (born 1948) (Everett), singer-songwriter
- Travis Long (born 1991) (Spokane), outside linebacker for Philadelphia Eagles
- Sam Longoria (born 1956) (Seattle), producer, visual effects engineer
- Dane Looker (born 1976) (Puyallup), wide receiver, St. Louis Rams

== M ==
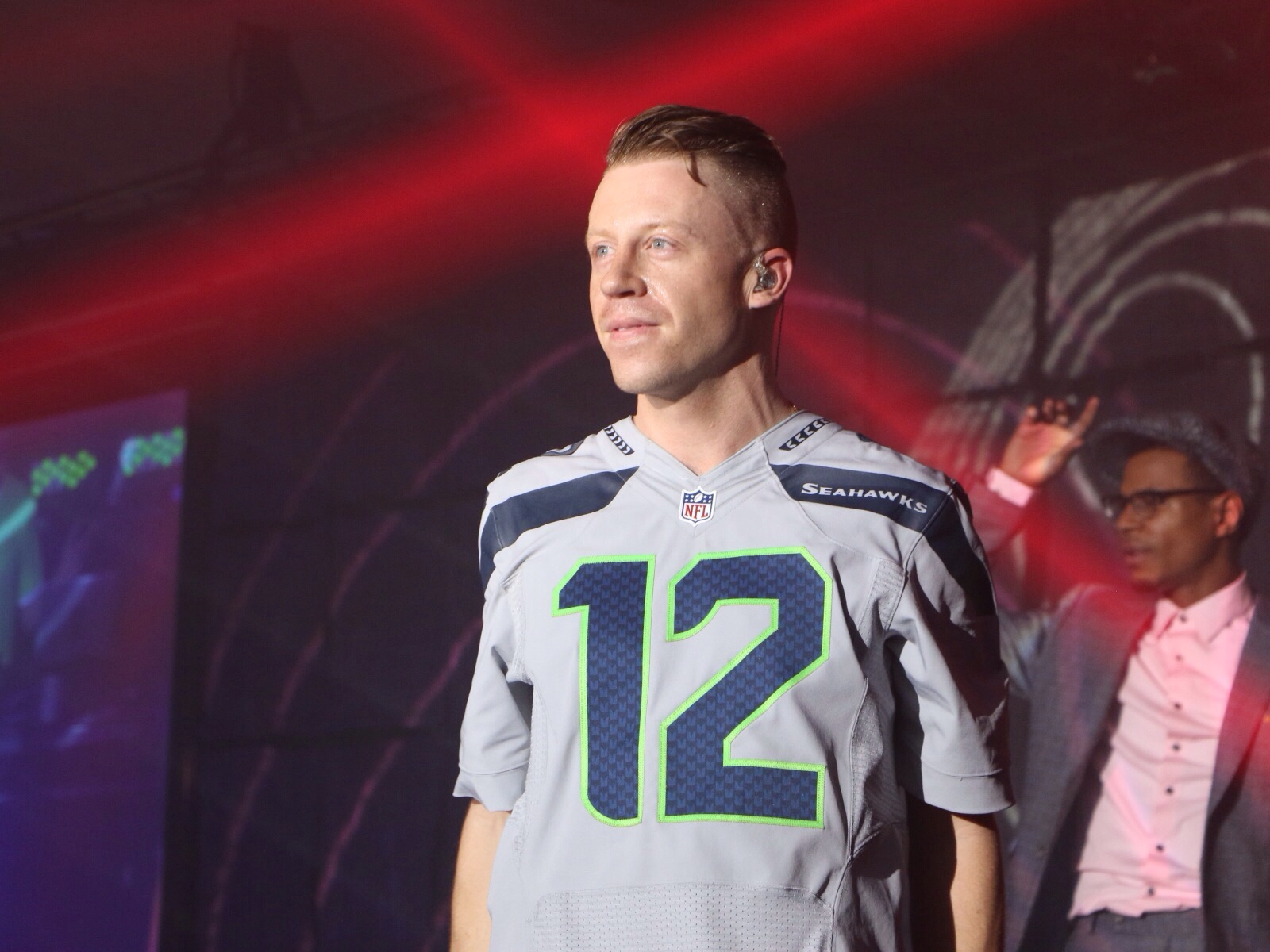
Macklemore

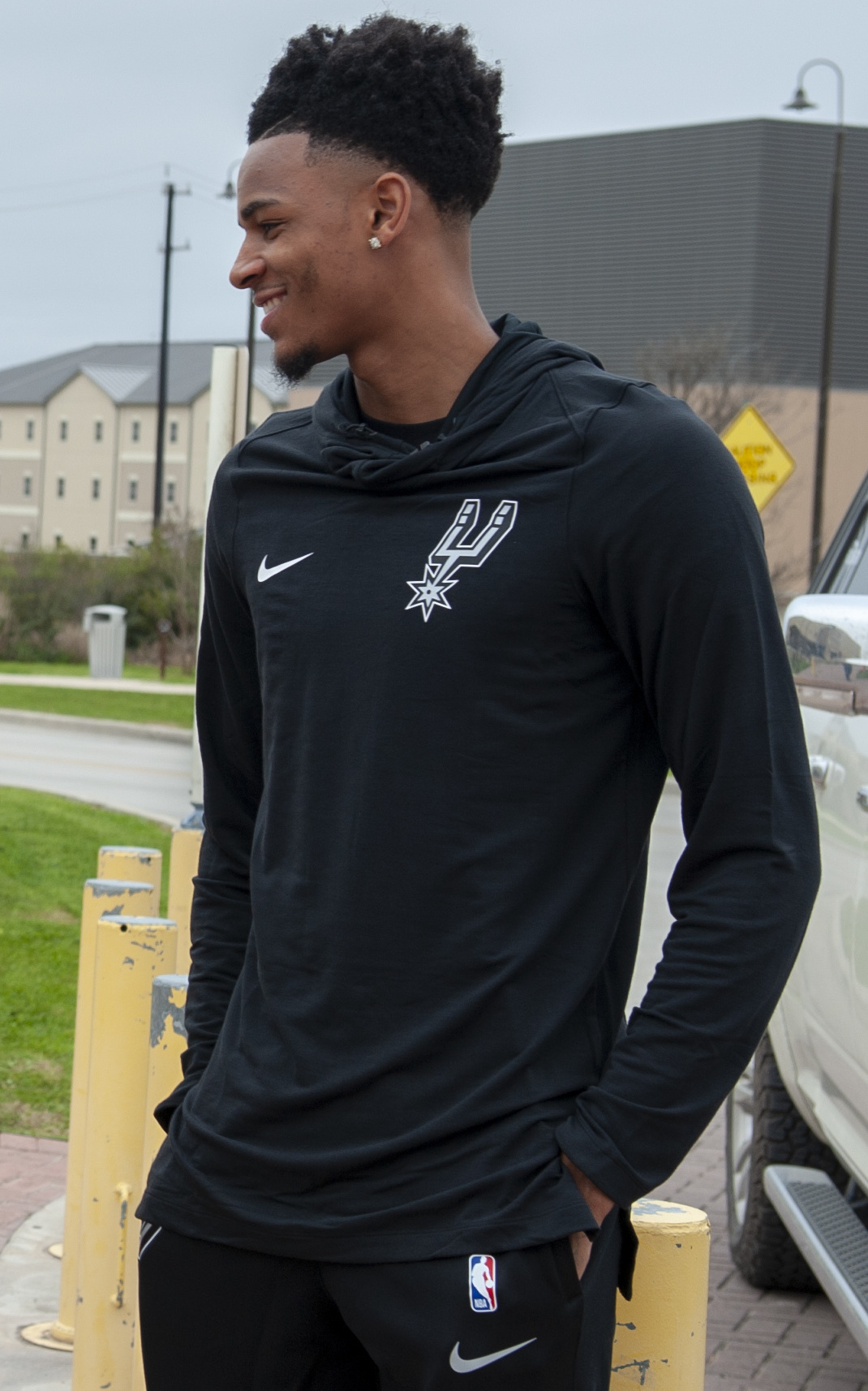
Dejounte Murray

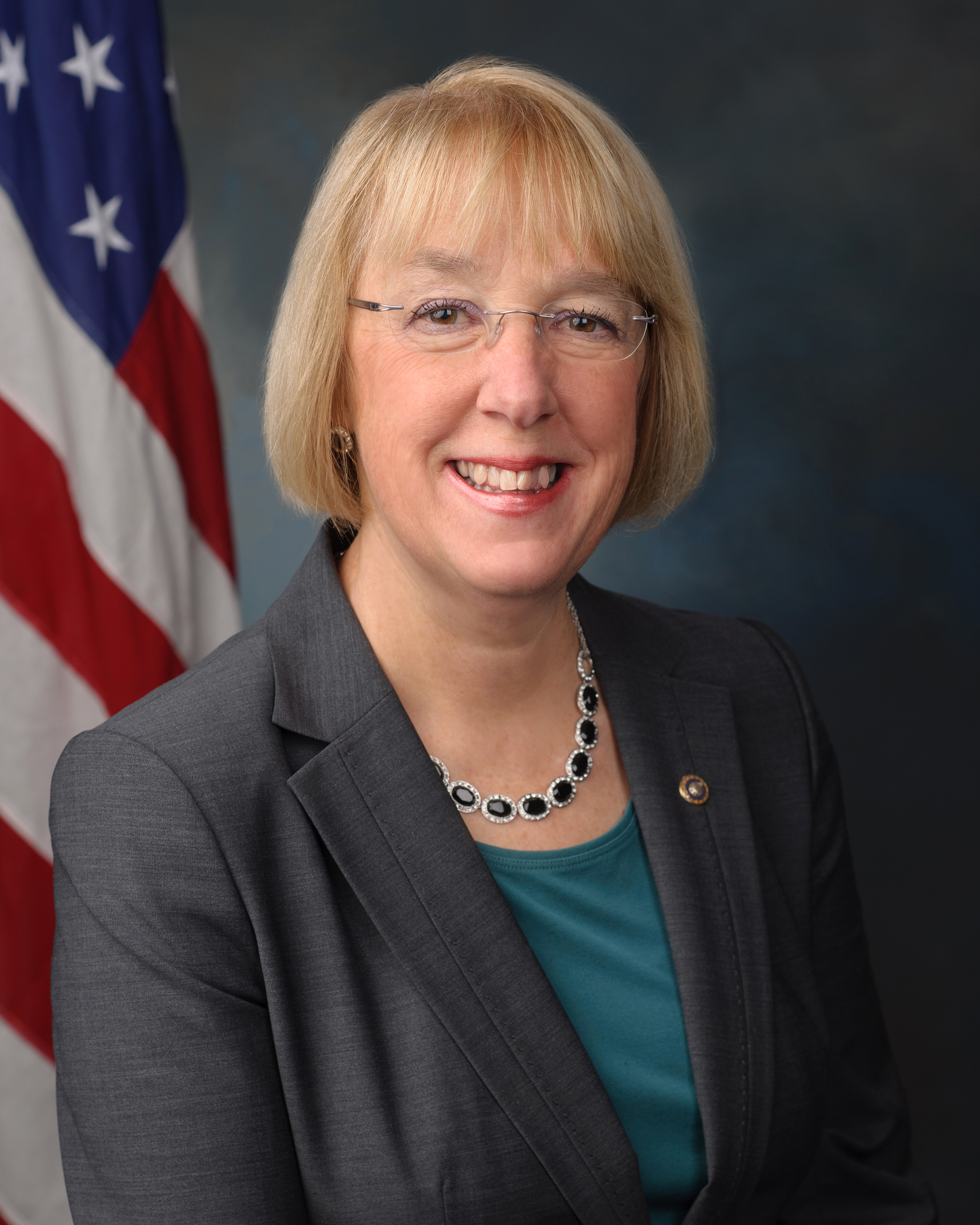
Patty Murray

- Betty MacDonald (1908–1958), children's author
- Macklemore (Seattle) (born Ben Haggerty, 1983), Northwest hip-hop singer
- Kyle MacLachlan (Yakima) (born 1959), actor, Desperate Housewives, Twin Peaks, Sex and the City
- Warren Magnuson (1905–1989), six-term US senator and dean of the United States Senate (1979–1981)
- Nina Makino (born 2005) (Seattle), singer and member of NiziU
- Sanjaya Malakar (born 1989) (Federal Way), singer, American Idol finalist
- Joe E. Mann (1922–1944) (Reardan), soldier who saved his comrades
- Mary Mapes (Burlington), former 60 Minutes producer fired for 2004 Killian documents scandal
- Charlie Marinkovich (born 1959) (Seattle), singer-songwriter, guitarist for Iron Butterfly
- Bristol Marunde (born 1982) (Sequim), mixed martial artist
- Ross Mathews (born 1979) (Mount Vernon), television personality
- Dave Matthews (born 1967) (resides in Seattle), singer-songwriter
- James Mattis (born 1950) (Pullman), U.S. Secretary of Defense
- Trevor May (born 1989) (Kelso), relief pitcher, Minnesota Twins
- Doc Maynard (1808–1873), founding father of Seattle
- Taylor Mays (born 1988), NFL football player
- Kevin McCarthy (1914–2010) (Seattle), actor
- Mary McCarthy (1912–1989) (Seattle), author
- Mike McCready (born 1966) (Seattle), Pearl Jam guitarist
- Bear McCreary (born 1979), composer for film, television, video games
- Darren McGavin (1922–2006) (Spokane), actor, A Christmas Story, Kolchak, The Natural
- Rose McGowan (born 1973), actress, Paige Matthews on Charmed; attended high school in Seattle
- Joel McHale (born 1971), actor, comedian; attended high school in Seattle
- John McIntire (1907–1991) (Spokane), actor, Wagon Train
- Duff McKagan (born 1964) (Seattle), Velvet Revolver, Guns N' Roses bassist
- Bonnie McKee (born 1985) (raised in Seattle), singer-songwriter
- Patricia McPherson (born 1954), actress, Knight Rider
- Santiago Villalba Mederos (born 1991), murderer and former FBI most wanted fugitive
- Jack Medica (1914–1985) (Seattle), competitive swimmer, Olympic gold medalist, nine-time NCAA champion
- Fred Mess (1872–1951), member of the Washington House of Representatives from 1917 to 1933
- Marjie Millar (1931–1966) (Tacoma), actress, About Mrs. Leslie, Money from Home
- Angie Miller (born 1994), singer, American Idol runner-up
- Roy Miller (born 1987) (Fort Lewis), defensive tackle for Jacksonville Jaguars
- Sam Miller (Olympia), comedian
- Martin Milner (1931–2015) (Seattle), actor, Adam-12, Route 66, The Swiss Family Robinson
- Jon Brower Minnoch (1941–1983), heaviest recorded human in history, weighed 635 kg or 1400 lbs
- Gary Miranda (born 1939), poet
- Beau Mirchoff (born 1989), actor, MTV's Awkward
- Patrick Monahan (born 1969), lead singer for band Train
- Jeff Monson, mixed martial artist, UFC fighter
- Jeffrey Dean Morgan (born 1966) (Seattle), actor, Watchmen, Grey's Anatomy, Magic City
- Mark Morris (born 1956) (Seattle), dancer and choreographer
- Adam Morrison (born 1984) (raised in Spokane), professional basketball player
- Lil Mosey (born 2002) (Mountlake Terrace), rapper
- Robert Motherwell (1915–1991) (Aberdeen), abstract expressionist painter
- Dejounte Murray (born 1996) (Seattle), professional basketball player
- Patty Murray (born 1950) (Bothell), U.S. senator
- Edward R. Murrow (1908–1965), CBS News correspondent; attended high school in Edison and Washington State University
- PZ Myers (born 1957) (Kent), scientist, professor University of Minnesota Morris
- Randy Myers (born 1962) (Vancouver), MLB four-time All-Star relief pitcher

== N ==
- Craig T. Nelson (born 1944) (Spokane), actor, The Incredibles, Coach, Parenthood
- Billy North (born 1948) (Seattle), former Major League Baseball player
- Krist Novoselic (born 1965), Nirvana bassist
- Bill Nye (born 1955), Bill Nye the Science Guy

== O ==
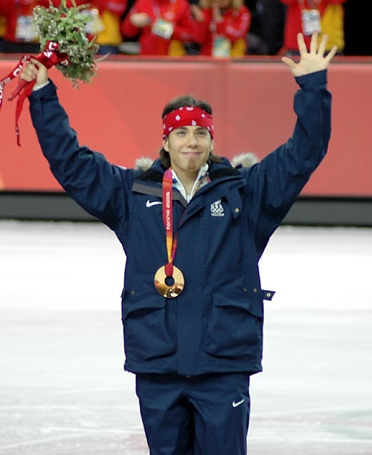
Apolo Ohno

- Pat O'Day (1934–2020), KJR radio disc jockey, considered godfather of Seattle rock music scene
- Eric O'Flaherty (born 1985) (Walla Walla), pitcher, Oakland Athletics
- Apolo Anton Ohno (born 1982) (Seattle), Olympic speed skater
- Danny O'Keefe (born 1943) (Spokane), musician
- John Olerud (born 1968) (Seattle), Major League Baseball first baseman
- Deanna Oliver (born 1952) (Spokane), actress, Toaster from The Brave Little Toaster and its sequels
- Gregg Olsen (born 1959) (Seattle), true crime author
- Tyler Olson (born 1989) (Spokane), Major League Baseball pitcher
- Henry O'Malley (1876–1936), United States Commissioner of Fish and Fisheries
- Robert Osborne (1932–2017) (Colfax), film historian, TV personality
- Roger "Buzz" Osborne (born 1964) (Morton), guitarist, vocalist and songwriter, founder of Melvins, Fantômas and Venomous Concept
- Lyle Overbay (born 1977) (Centralia), MLB first baseman
- Logan Owen (born 1995) (Bremerton), professional cyclist, Cannondale–Drapac
- Seena Owen (1894–1966) (Spokane), actress, Queen Kelly, Victory

== P ==
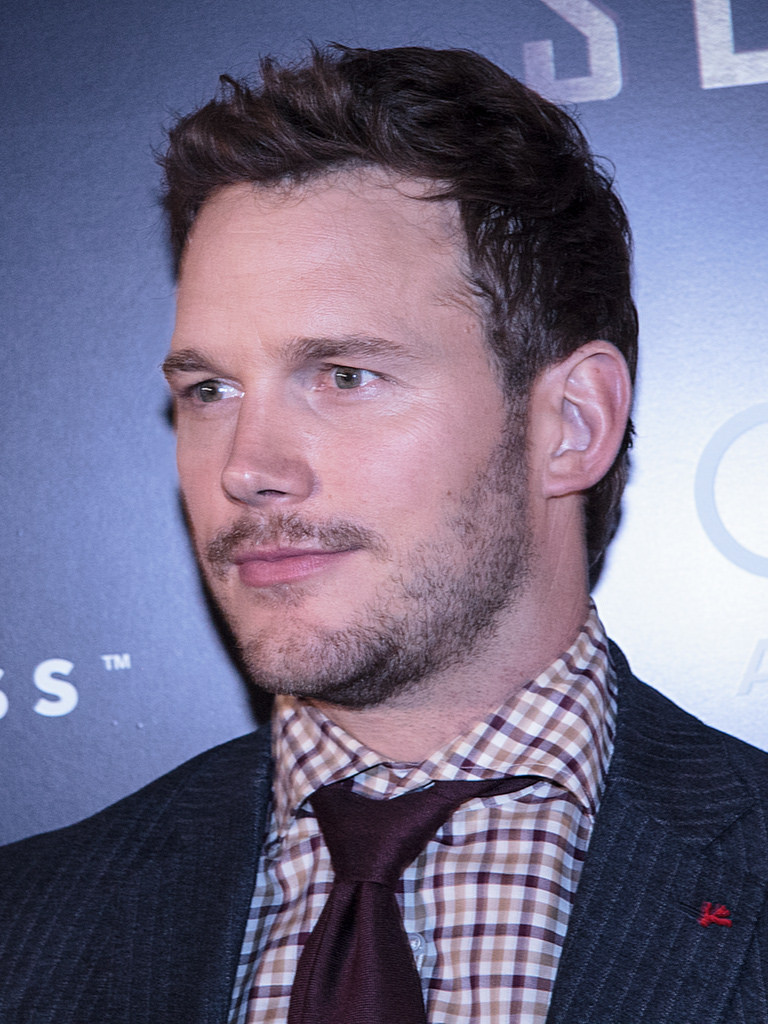
Chris Pratt

- Janis Paige (1922–2024) (Tacoma), actress
- Chuck Palahniuk (born 1962) (Pasco), novelist and freelance journalist
- Jaebeom Park (born 1987), member of Korean music group 2PM
- J. P. Patches (born Chris Wedes; 1928–2013), clown; hosted one of the longest-running locally produced children's program in U.S. history
- Robin Pecknold (born 1986), musician
- Janice Pennington (born 1942), model, The Price is Right
- Oliff Peterson (1848–after 1891), member of the Washington House of Representatives from 1889 to 1891
- Jay Pickett (1961–2021) (Spokane), actor, Port Charles, General Hospital
- Mark Pigott (born 1954), chairman and chief executive officer, Paccar
- Chris Pratt (born 1979) (raised in Lake Stevens), actor, Everwood, Parks and Recreation
- Megyn Price (born 1971) (Seattle), actress
- Cory Procter (born 1982) (Gig Harbor), guard for Miami Dolphins
- Dorothy Provine (born 1935 in Deadwood, South Dakota, died in Bremerton, Washington, 2010), singer, actress, attended University of Washington
- Henry Prusoff (1912–1943) (Seattle), tennis player; #8 in singles in the U.S. in 1940

== R ==
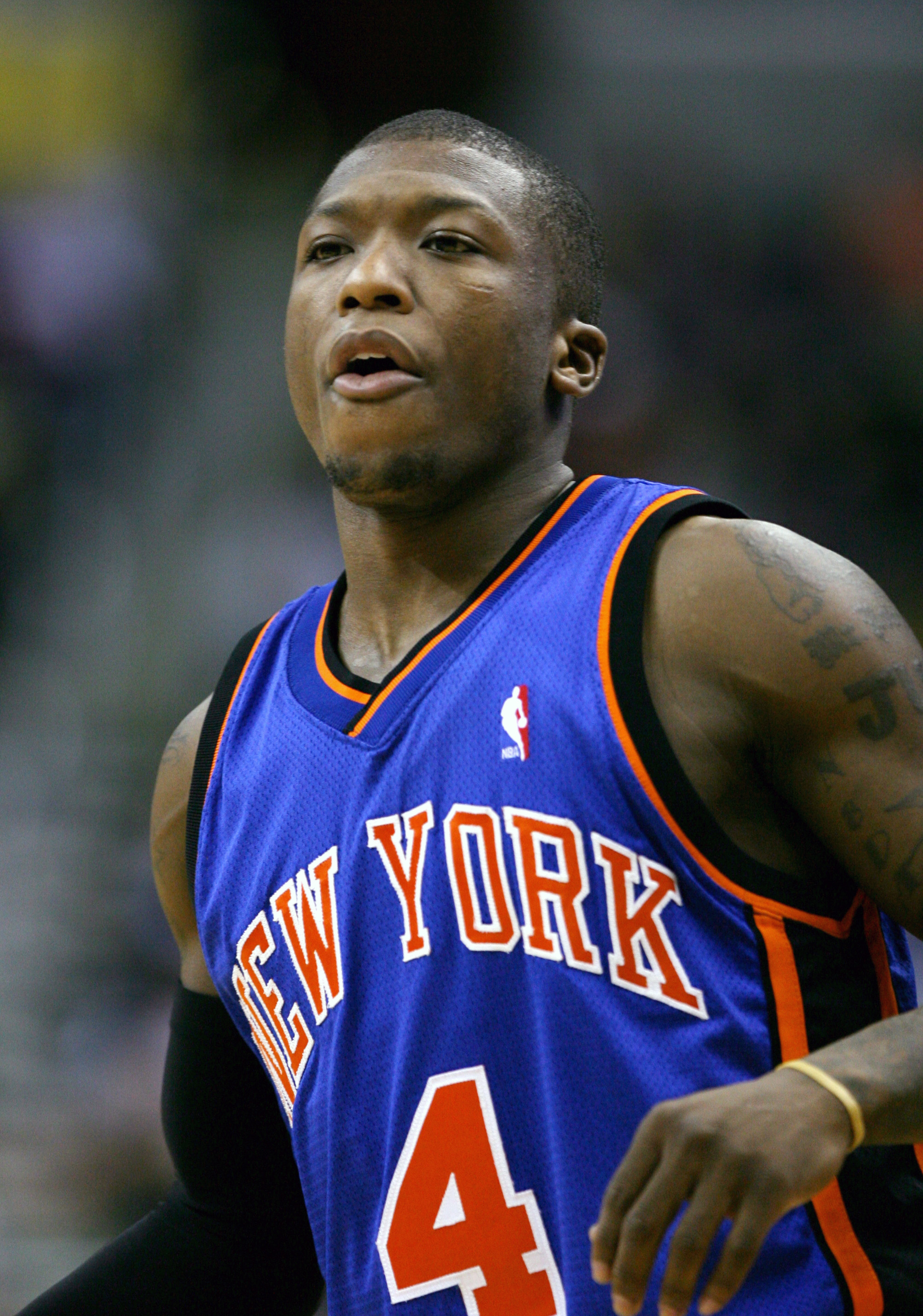
Nate Robinson

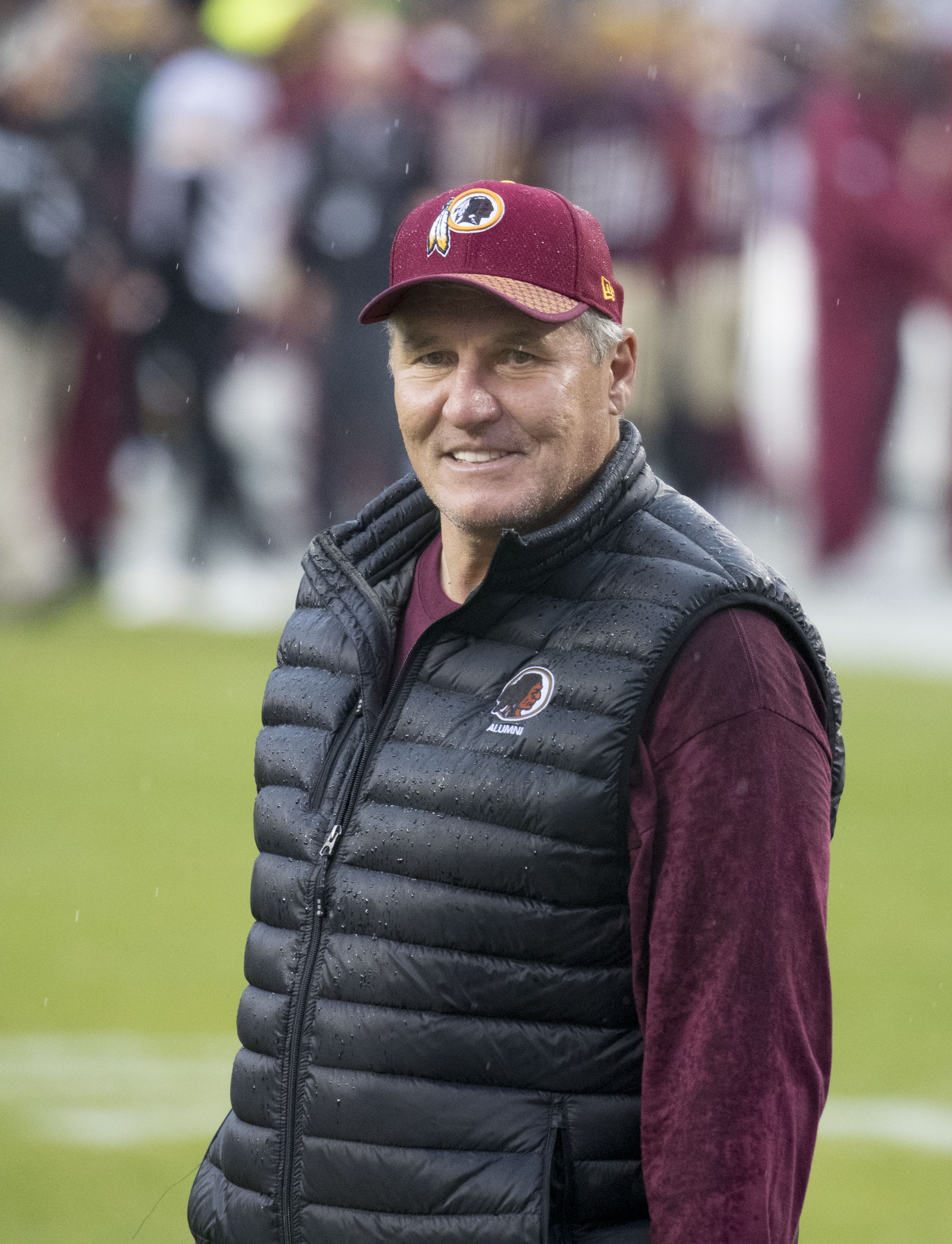
Mark Rypien

- Benji Radach (born 1979) (Castle Rock), professional mixed martial artist
- Ella Raines (1920–1988) (Snoqualmie Falls), actress
- Ford Rainey (Centralia), actor
- Blair Rasmussen (born 1962) (Auburn), basketball player, Denver Nuggets
- John Ratzenberger (born 1947, built a house on Vashon Island as a summer home in the 1990s), Cliff Clavin on Cheers
- Pamela Reed (born 1949) (Tacoma), actress
- Dave Reichert (born 1950) (raised in Kent), congressman, law enforcement officer
- Ann Reinking (1949–2020) (Seattle), actress, dancer, choreographer
- Jason Repko (born 1980) (Richland), outfielder for Minnesota Twins
- John Requa (born 1967) (raised in Burien), screenwriter, Cats & Dogs and Bad Santa
- Roger Revelle (1909–1991) (Seattle), scientist, pioneer of global warming studies
- Don Rich (1941–1974) (Olympia), guitarist, singer with Buck Owens
- Davey Richards (born 1983), professional wrestler
- Gary Ridgway (born 1949), serial killer
- Luke Ridnour (born 1982), point guard for Minnesota Timberwolves; attended high school in Blaine
- Theodore Rinaldo (Snohomish) (1944–2000), convicted child sex offender
- James Robart (born 1947) (Seattle), federal judge
- Tom Robbins (born 1932), best-selling novelist, worked for The Seattle Times
- Howard P. Robertson (1903–1961) (Hoquiam), cosmologist
- Laurent Robinson (born 1985) (Fort Lewis), wide receiver for Dallas Cowboys
- Nate Robinson (born 1984) (Seattle), guard for Golden State Warriors
- Jimmie Rodgers (1933–2021) (Camas), pop singer
- Jarred Rome (Marysville), Olympic discus thrower, bodybuilder
- Emily Rose (born 1981), actress, ER, Brothers & Sisters, John from Cincinnati
- Brandon Roy (born 1984) (Seattle), shooting guard for Portland Trail Blazers
- Kathryn Ruemmler (born 1971) (Richland), White House counsel to President Barack Obama
- Ann Rule (1931–2015), true-crime author; attended University of Washington; worked with the Seattle Police Department
- Merrilee Rush (born Merrilee Gunst, 1944) (Seattle), singer, "Angel of the Morning"
- Gerri Russell (born 1962), romantic fiction author
- Rick Rydell (born 1963) (Seattle), radio talk show host, author, outdoors writer
- Mark Rypien (born 1962) (raised in Spokane), quarterback for Washington Redskins, MVP of Super Bowl XXVI, philanthropist

== S ==
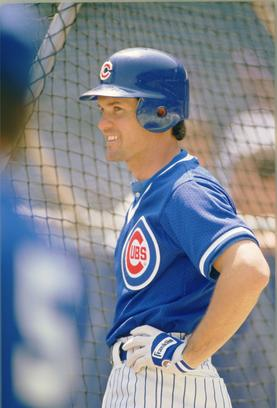
Ryne Sandberg

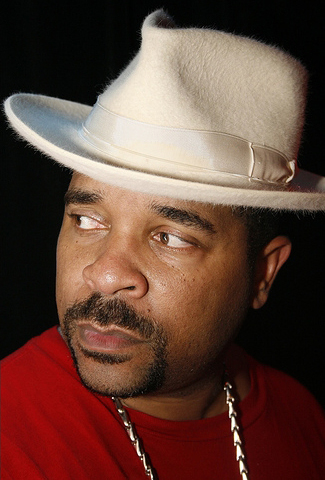
Sir Mix-a-Lot

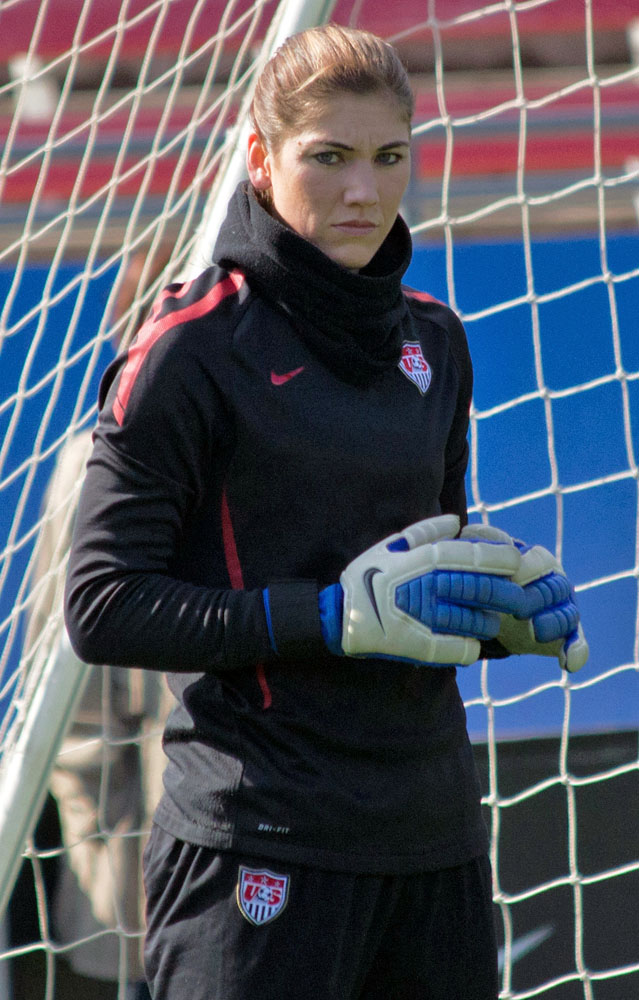
Hope Solo

Sa–Sm

- Bud Sagendorf (1915–1994) (Wenatchee), cartoonist, known for illustrating Popeye
- Ryne Sandberg (born 1959) (Spokane), MLB player and manager, member of Baseball Hall of Fame
- Larry Sanger (born 1968), Wikipedia co-founder
- Ron Santo (1940–2010) (Seattle), third baseman and radio broadcaster for Chicago Cubs; member of Baseball Hall of Fame
- Robert (Bob) Satiacum (1929–1991), Puyallup tribal leader, American Indian activist
- Dan Savage (born 1964), writer of advice column Savage Love and editor of Seattle weekly The Stranger
- Brian Scalabrine (born 1978) (raised in Enumclaw), professional basketball player
- Oscar Schumann (1885–1972), member of the Washington House of Representatives from 1939 to 1953
- Ivyann Schwan (born 1983), child actress, Parenthood, Problem Child 2
- Dick Scobee (1939–1986), astronaut, commander of Space Shuttle Challenger
- Seattle (c. 1786–1866), Duwamish/Suquamish leader and diplomat
- Daniel Seavey (born 1999) (Vancouver), singer-songwriter, member of Why Don't We, contestant on American Idol season 14
- Kyle Secor (born 1957) (Tacoma), actor
- Derek Sheen, stand-up comedian
- Danny Shelton (born 1993) (Auburn), defensive tackle for New England Patriots
- Robert Shields (1918–2007) (Dayton), minister and teacher who wrote a 37.5-million-word diary, possibly the longest ever written
- Roger Shimomura (born 1939) (Seattle), artist, professor at University of Kansas
- Tre Simmons (born 1982) (Seattle), professional basketball player
- Sir Mix-a-Lot (born Anthony Ray, 1963), hip-hop artist
- Doug Sisk (born 1957) (Renton), MLB pitcher
- Grady Sizemore (born 1982) (Seattle), MLB player, three-time All-Star, Silver Slugger award winner
- Tom Skerritt (born 1933), actor; lives in Lake Washington
- Alex Smith (born 1984) (Seattle), quarterback for Kansas City Chiefs
- Jeff Smith (1939–2004) (Seattle), food expert, television personality
- Shawn Smith (1956–2019), rock musician
- Smohalla (c. 1851–1895), Sahaptin spiritual leader

Sn–Sz

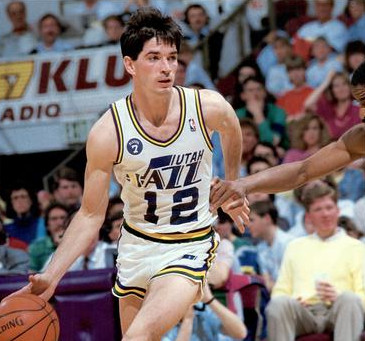
John Stockton

- Blake Snell (born 1992) (Seattle), starting pitcher for the Los Angeles Dodgers
- Tom Sneva (born 1948) (Spokane), 1983 Indy 500 champion, 2-time USAC champion
- Travis Snider (born 1988) (Everett), MLB outfielder
- Quin Snyder (born 1966) (Mercer Island), head coach of NBA's Utah Jazz
- Tim Soares (born 1997), American-Brazilian basketball player for Ironi Ness Ziona of the Israeli Basketball Premier League
- Hope Solo (born 1981) (Richland), goalkeeper for United States women's national soccer team
- Steven Souza (born 1989) (Everett), outfielder for Arizona Diamondbacks
- Jack Owen Spillman (Spokane) (born 1960), serial killer, "Werewolf Butcher"
- Layne Staley (1967–2002), vocalist for Alice in Chains
- Isaiah Stanback (Seattle) (born 1984), wide receiver on New York Giants
- Lyn Stanley (Tacoma), jazz singer
- Rick Steves (born 1955) (Edmonds), authority on European travel
- Jonathan Stewart (born 1987) (Fort Lewis), running back for New York Giants
- Ryan Stiles (born 1959) (Seattle), actor, comedian, The Drew Carey Show, Whose Line Is It Anyway?, Two and a Half Men
- Robert Stock (born 1989) (Bellevue), MLB player
- John Stockton (born 1962) (Spokane), Hall of Fame player for NBA's Utah Jazz
- Mel Stottlemyre (1941–2019), Former pitcher and coach for New York Yankees; lived in Issaquah
- Keaton Stromberg (born July 16, 1996) (Sequim), appeared on The X Factor USA with trio Emblem3
- Wesley Stromberg (born December 6, 1994) (Sequim), appeared on The X Factor USA with trio Emblem3
- Robert Stroud (1890–1963) (Seattle), convict, "Birdman of Alcatraz"
- Rodney Stuckey (born 1986) (Seattle), NBA player
- Michael Swango (born 1954), physician, serial killer
- Julia Sweeney (born 1959) (Spokane), actress, comedian, Saturday Night Live
- Sydney Sweeney (born 1997) (Spokane), actress, Euphoria
- Gloria Wilson Swisher (born 1935) (Seattle), composer and educator
- H. H. Swofford (1873–1970), politician

== T ==
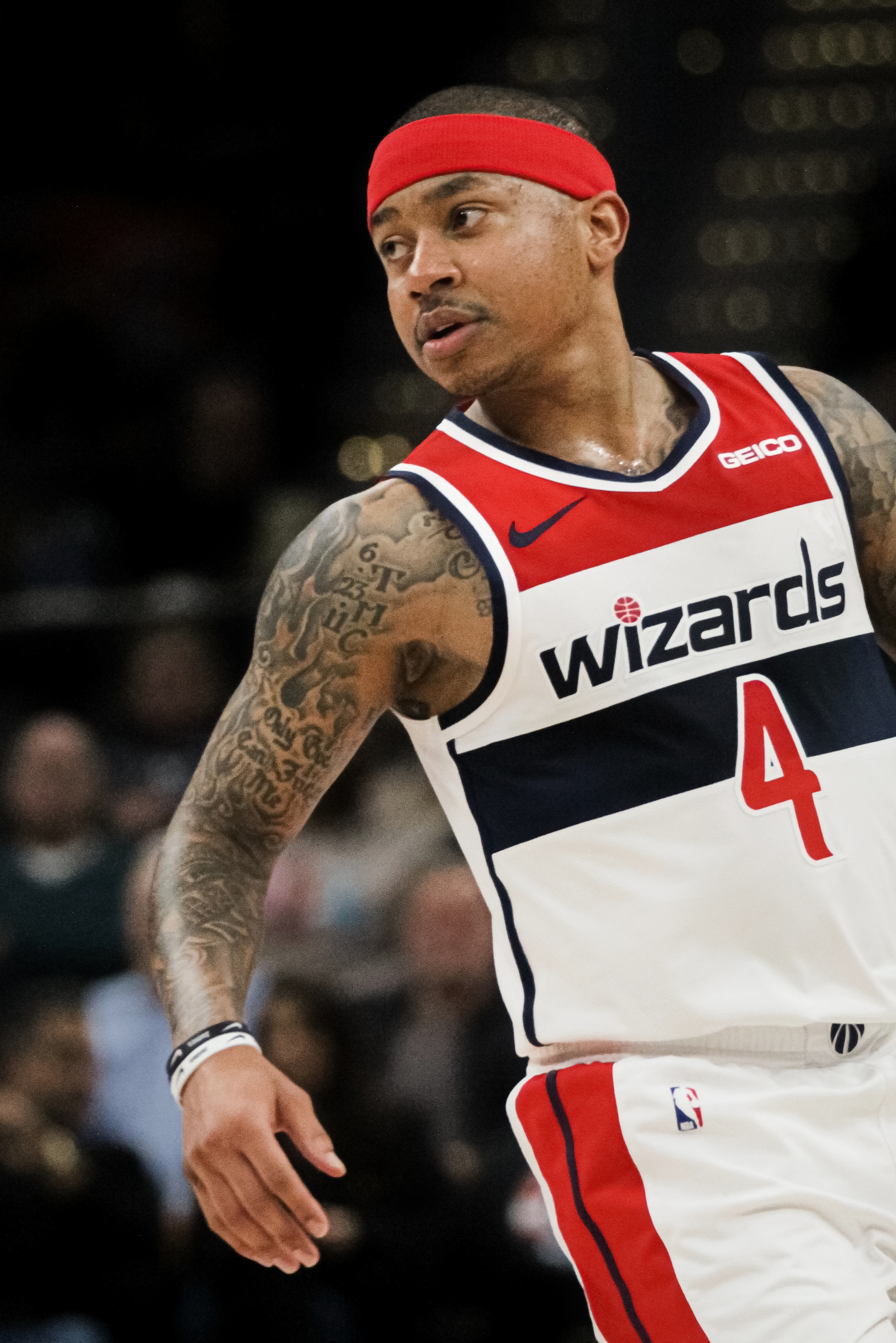
Isaiah Thomas

Zach Top

- Miesha Tate (born 1986) (Tacoma), UFC mixed martial artist
- Chrissy Teigen (born 1985) (Snohomish), Sports Illustrated model
- Daniel Te'o-Nesheim (born 1987), NFL defensive end; lived in Mill Creek
- Jason Terry (born 1977) (Seattle), NBA player for Milwaukee Bucks
- Kim Thayil (born 1960), guitarist for grunge band Soundgarden
- Isaiah Thomas (born 1989) (Tacoma), point guard for Los Angeles Lakers
- Brian Thompson (born 1959) (Ellensburg), actor
- Cappy Thompson (born 1952), glass artist
- Nick Thune (born 1979) (Seattle), actor, comedian, and musician
- Zach Top (born 1997) (Sunnyside, Pasco), singer-songwriter
- Earl Torgeson (1924–1990) (Snohomish), Major League Baseball player
- Rachel Trachtenburg (born 1993), drummer, singer of Trachtenburg Family Slideshow Players
- Desmond Trufant (born 1990), NFL cornerback for Atlanta Falcons
- George Tsutakawa (1910–1997) (Seattle), sculptor and painter
- J. E. Tucker (1833–1910), state representative
- Ann Tyrrell (1909–1983) (Whatcom County), actress, Private Secretary and The Ann Sothern Show

== U ==
- Blair Underwood (born 1964) (Tacoma), actor, L.A. Law, The New Adventures of Old Christine, Ironside
- Misty Upham (born 1982) (Auburn), actress
- Brian Urlacher (born 1978) (born in Pasco, but raised in New Mexico), linebacker for the Chicago Bears

== V ==
- Greg "The Hammer" Valentine (born 1951) (Seattle), professional wrestler
- Courtney Vandersloot (born 1989) (Kent), player with WNBA's Chicago Sky
- Eddie Vedder (born 1964), vocalist for Pearl Jam; lived in Seattle
- Austin Voth (born 1992) (Redmond), relief pitcher for the Washington Nationals

== W ==
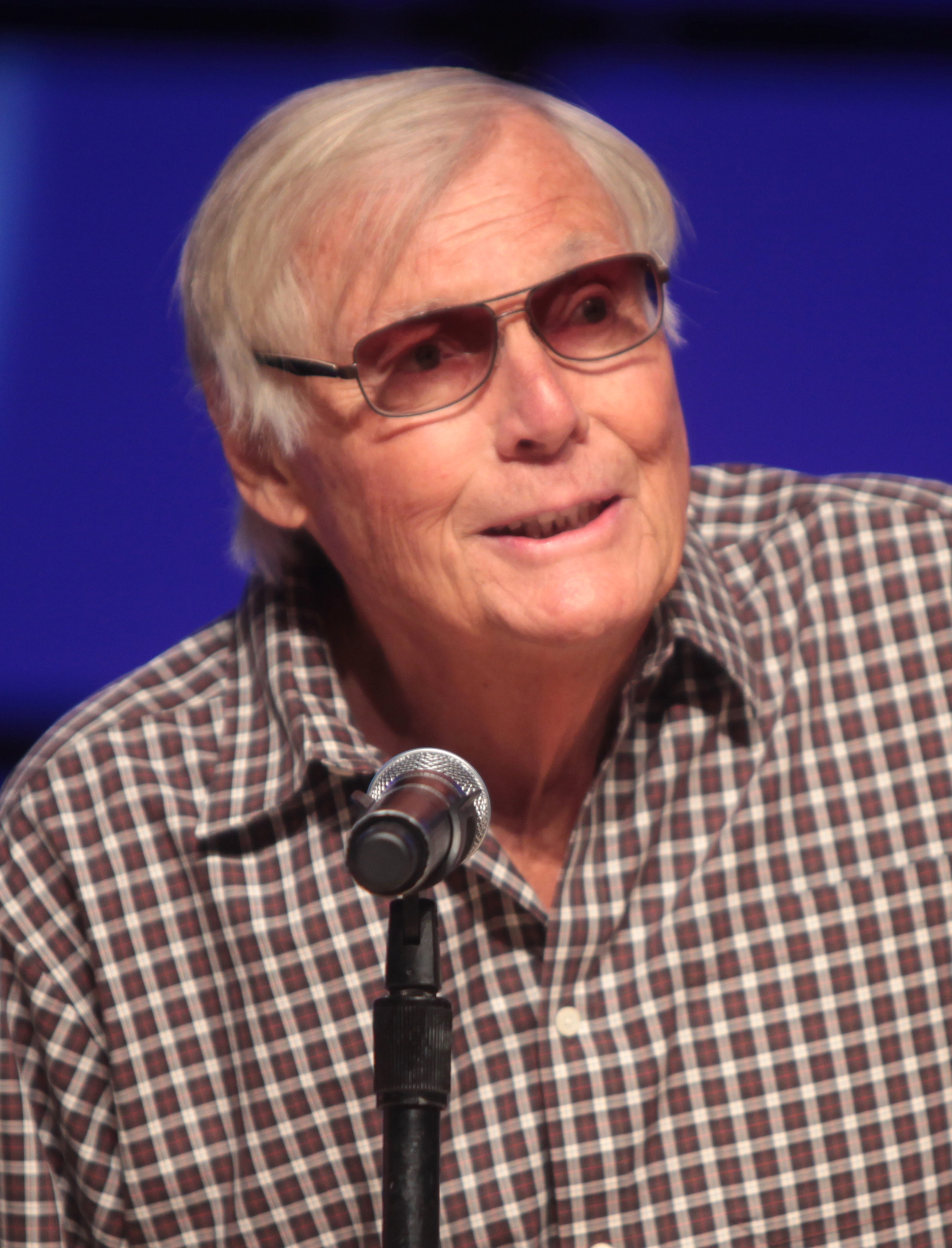
Adam West

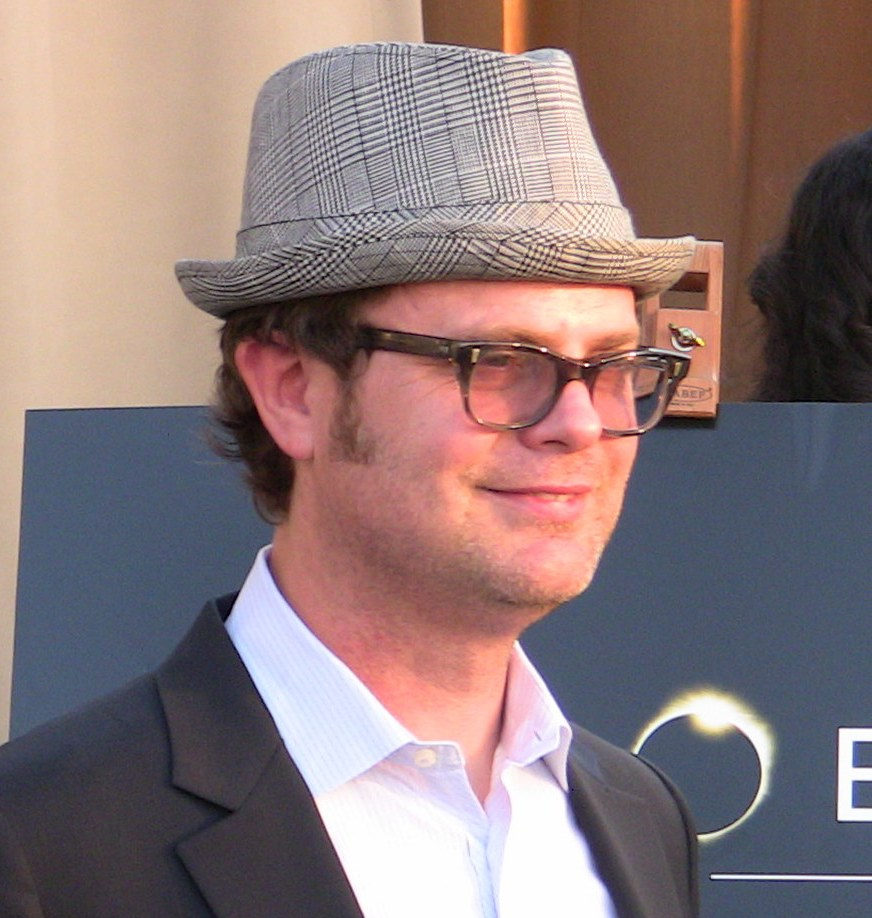
Rainn Wilson

- Kristen Waggoner (born 1972), president, CEO, and general counsel of Alliance Defending Freedom since 2022
- Chris Walla (born 1975) (Bothell), guitarist for Death Cab for Cutie
- Jessica Wallenfels, actress, choreographer, and movement/theatre director
- Maiara Walsh (born 1988), actress, singer, Ana Solis on Desperate Housewives and Meena Paroom on Cory in the House
- Bryan Walters (born 1987), wide receiver for San Diego Chargers
- Jennifer Warnes (born 1947) (Seattle), singer
- Martell Webster (born 1986), NBA player, Minnesota Timberwolves
- Zoe Weizenbaum (born 1991) (Seattle), actor
- Adam West (1928–2017) (Seattle), actor; played Batman on TV series (1966–1968)
- Tucker Wetmore (born 1999) (Kalama), country singer-songwriter
- Myles White (born 1990) (Tacoma), wide receiver for New York Giants
- Sammy White (1928–1991) (Wenatchee), Major League Baseball player
- Sean White (born 1981) (Pullman), relief pitcher for Boston Red Sox
- Bernie Whitebear (born Bernard Reyes; 1937–2000), American Indian activist
- Christopher Wiehl (born 1970) (Yakima), actor
- Lis Wiehl (born 1961), legal analyst for Fox News; author
- Jacob Wiley (born 1994), Israeli Basketball Premier League player
- Michael Winslow (Spokane) (born 1958), actor and comedian; Cadet Jones in Police Academy films
- Marcus Williams (born 1986) (Seattle), NBA player
- Marvin Williams (born 1986) (Bremerton), NBA player for Charlotte Hornets
- Terrence Williams (born 1987) (Seattle), NBA player for Houston Rockets
- Ann (born 1950) and Nancy Wilson (born 1954), members of Heart; lived in Bellevue
- Rainn Wilson (born 1966) (Seattle), actor, The Office

== Y ==
- Takuji Yamashita (1874–1952), early 20th-century civil-rights pioneer
- Robert Lee Yates (born 1952) (Spokane), serial killer
- DeAndre Yedlin (born 1993), soccer player
- Henry Yesler (Seattle), entrepreneur; considered to be one of Seattle's founding fathers
- Chika Yoshida (born 1984) (Anacortes), YouTuber
- Katrina Young (born 1992) (Shoreline), two time Olympic platform diver

== Z ==
- Constance Zimmer (born 1970) (Seattle), actress, Entourage, Boston Legal, House of Cards

== See also ==
- List of Washington (state) suffragists

By educational institution affiliation

- List of Cornish College of the Arts people
- List of The Evergreen State College people
- List of University of Washington people

By governmental office

- List of attorneys general of Washington
- List of governors of Washington
- List of justices of the Washington Supreme Court
- List of United States representatives from Washington
- List of United States senators from Washington

By location

- List of people from Bellingham, Washington
- List of people from Everett, Washington
- List of people from Olympia, Washington
- List of people from Seattle
- List of people from Spokane, Washington
- List of people from Vancouver, Washington
