= List of people from Washington =

List of people from Washington may refer to:

- List of people from Washington (state)
- List of people from Washington, D.C.
