= J. E. Tucker =

American politician

Member of the Washington House of Representatives
- In office 1889–1891

Personal details
- Born: October 17, 1833 Ohio, United States
- Died: December 13, 1910 (aged 77) Friday Harbor, Washington, United States
- Party: Republican

Joseph Edwin Tucker (October 17, 1833 – December 13, 1910) was an American politician in the state of Washington. He served in the Washington House of Representatives from 1889 to 1891.
