= Oliff Peterson =

American politician

Member of the Washington House of Representatives
- In office 1889–1891

Personal details
- Born: 1848
- Party: Republican

Oliff Peterson (born 1848) was an American politician in the state of Washington. He served in the Washington House of Representatives from 1889 to 1891 as a member of the Republican party.
