= O. R. Schumann =

American politician

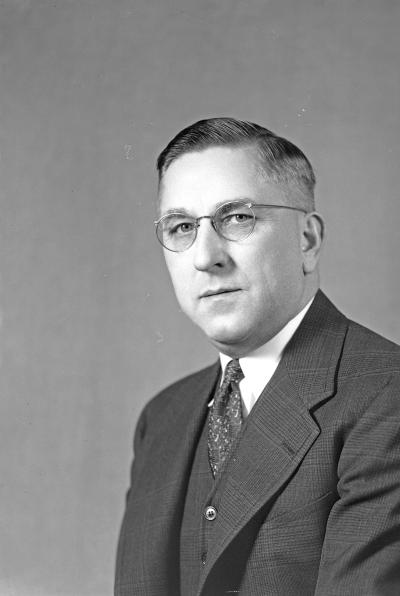
- Schumann in 1939

Member of the Washington House of Representatives for the 14th district
- In office 1939–1953

Personal details
- Born: August 31, 1885 Beaver Dam, Wisconsin, United States
- Died: December 8, 1972 (aged 87) Yakima, Washington, United States
- Party: Republican

Oscar Robert Schumann (August 31, 1885 – December 8, 1972) was an American politician in the state of Washington. He served in the Washington House of Representatives from 1939 to 1953 for District 14.
