= E. F. Banker =

American politician

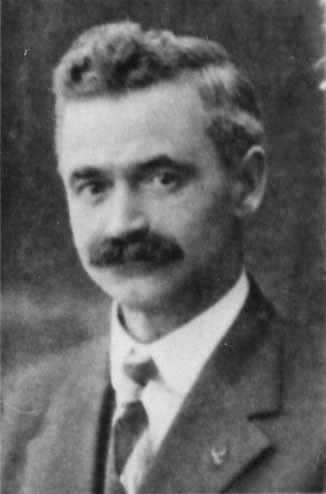
- Banker in 1917

Member of the Washington House of Representatives from the 1st district
- In office 1931–1933

Member of the Washington House of Representatives from the 17th district
- In office 1917–1931

Personal details
- Born: July 19, 1871 New York, United States
- Died: June 24, 1939 (aged 67) Winthrop, Washington, United States
- Party: Democratic

Elmer Fisk Banker (July 19, 1871 – June 24, 1939) was an American politician in the state of Washington. He served in the Washington House of Representatives from 1917 to 1933.
