= Fred J. Mess =

American politician

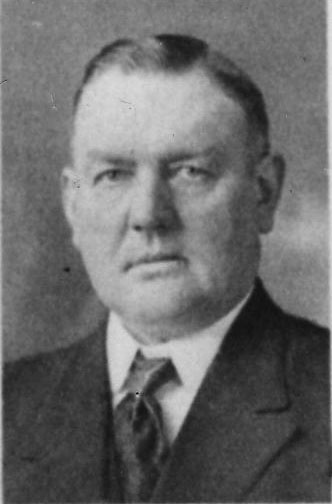
- Mess in 1917

Member of the Washington House of Representatives for the 40th district
- In office 1911–1927

Personal details
- Born: February 1872 Washington, United States
- Died: July 29, 1951 (aged 79) Orillia, Washington, United States
- Party: Republican

Frederick J. Mess (February 1872 – July 29, 1951) was an American politician in the state of Washington. He served in the Washington House of Representatives from 1917 to 1933.
