= Burnley Embankment =

Waterway in the United Kingdom

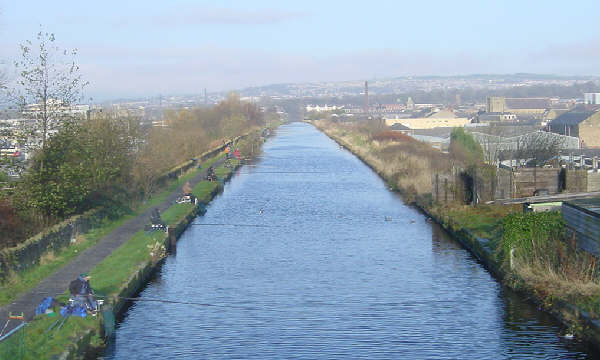
- The embankment viewed from the Finsley Gate bridge
- Coordinates: 53°47′19″N 2°14′15″W
- OS grid reference: SD844324
- Carries: Leeds and Liverpool Canal
- Crosses: Calder valley, Brun valley, Yorkshire Street
- Locale: Burnley, Lancashire, England
- Maintained by: Canal & River Trust
- Heritage status: Grade II listed (partial)

Characteristics
- Material: Soil (embankment); Stone (Calder aqueduct); Sandstone (retaining walls)
- Total length: 1,256 yd (1,148 m)
- Height: 60 ft (18 m)
- Traversable?: Yes
- Towpaths: W

History
- Designer: Robert Whitworth
- Construction start: 1796
- Construction end: 1801

The Burnley Embankment is an embankment carrying the Leeds and Liverpool Canal across the Calder and Brun valleys in Burnley, Lancashire. Also known as the Straight Mile, the embankment is 1,256 yards (0.714 mi; 1.148 km) long and the canal runs up to 60 feet (18 m) above the valley floor. The structure was chosen as one of the original Seven Wonders of the Waterways, and has been awarded a Red Wheel by the Transport Trust.

== Background ==
The building of the Leeds and Liverpool Canal began in 1770, but work on the over-budget project was suspended during the American War of Independence, leaving separate sections extending from the two cities. Under the original plan, the canal's route would have passed Burnley on the northern side of the River Calder, crossing at Whalley via an aqueduct. Burnley would have been connected by a branch heading up the valley. Before work on the canal resumed heading west from Gargrave, in 1790, permission was obtained to move the route to the south, with the river crossing between Filly Close in Reedley Hallows and Ightenhill. By the fourth act, Leeds and Liverpool Canal Act 1794 (34 Geo. 3. c. 94), this part of the route was settled, moving south again. At Burnley, the River Calder and its tributary the Brun meet in a broad valley, building the crossing still further up the Calder was considered, but the Towneley family objected to the canal coming so close to Towneley Hall.

== Construction ==
The embankment was built between 1796 and 1801 as an alternative to lock flights on each side of the valley. The embankment was designed by Robert Whitworth, who oversaw its construction until his death in 1799; he was succeeded by former inspector of works Samuel Fletcher. The construction of the embankment cost £22,000 (about £1.6 million in 2019). The embankment used 350,000 cubic yards (270,000 m^{3}) of earth, much of which came from the digging of the nearby 559-yard (511 m) Gannow Tunnel and the Whittlefield cutting.

The earthwork is 1,256 yards (0.714 mi; 1.148 km) long, it is aligned approximately north–south with the towpath on the western side. At the northern end was the Bank Hall estate, owned by John Hargreaves. The estate is now the site of Thompson Park, where the Sandy Holme Aqueduct carries the canal over the River Brun. Here, Godley Lane had to be diverted to meet the bridge that was constructed. While at the southern end, Finsley was presumably a farm before the arrival of the canal saw it converted into a wharf and important maintenance yard. The c.1700 house became the home of the engineer who operated the swing bridge originally thought to be a sufficient crossing for Finsley Gate.

About halfway along the embankment, the canal crosses Yorkshire Street (previously known as East Gate)—the only method of crossing the waterway at any point along its length. This is known as "The Culvert", although it is an aqueduct not a culvert. This was originally constructed in 1797 as a single horseshoe archway, 70 feet (21 m) from end to end, with a maximum height above the roadway of 14 feet (4.3 m) and maximum width of 22 feet 6 inches (6.86 m). A sandstone retaining wall on the east side of the embankment, immediately north of Yorkshire Street, features four lime kilns built at the time of the embankment. A further two kilns, on the west side of the embankment, were built to provide lime mortar for masonry and clay for puddling the canal.

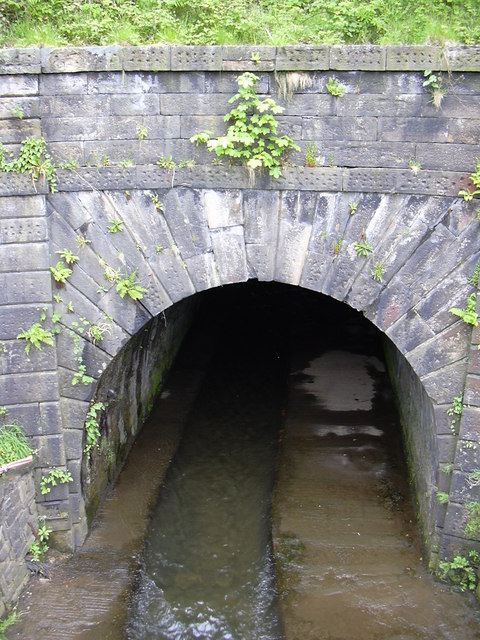
The River Calder aqueduct

The aqueduct over the River Calder is closer to the southern end, having been built between 1795 and 1796. Visually similar to the original road crossing, the portals are described as a "single semi-circular-headed arch with radiating voussoirs". There are pilasters to either side of the arch with many of the stone blocks decorated with shortbread vermiculation, and tapered wings support the surrounding earth.

Considerable time had to be allowed for the embankment to settle before it was stable enough to carry water, but once it was ready the canal opened to Clayton-le-Moors in 1801.

== Operational history ==
The town lies at the centre of the Burnley Coalfield, and the canal was routed through the town to provide transportation for the coal industry. During the first half of the 19th century, Fulledge Colliery to the east side of the embankment was linked to the canal by a tramroad. On the other side, the Burnley Drift passed under the southern end. A mine owned by Rev. Hargreaves caused a major collapse of the embankment as it extracted coal from directly underneath. The Calder culvert had to be partly rebuilt. There was also a short dock branch for coal loading at the very end, next to Finsley Gate.

In the latter half of the century, the older coalmines closed and their sites were built over, but the embankment continued to be used by the colliers. The coal dock at the south end was filled in, superseded by a coal yard connected to Towneley Colliery, located next to Finsley Wharf. Although the tramroad from Fulledge was removed, another was added on the opposite bank to supply the town's gasworks on the south side of the Calder. Another coal yard was established on the east side of the embankment, next to Central Mill, connected by a more complex system of tramroads that allowed coal to be delivered from Rowley and Bee Hole pits—opened in 1862 and 1872 respectively—and raise it up to a wharf. A triangular stone structure that survives on the canal side here probably supported a return wheel for the system.

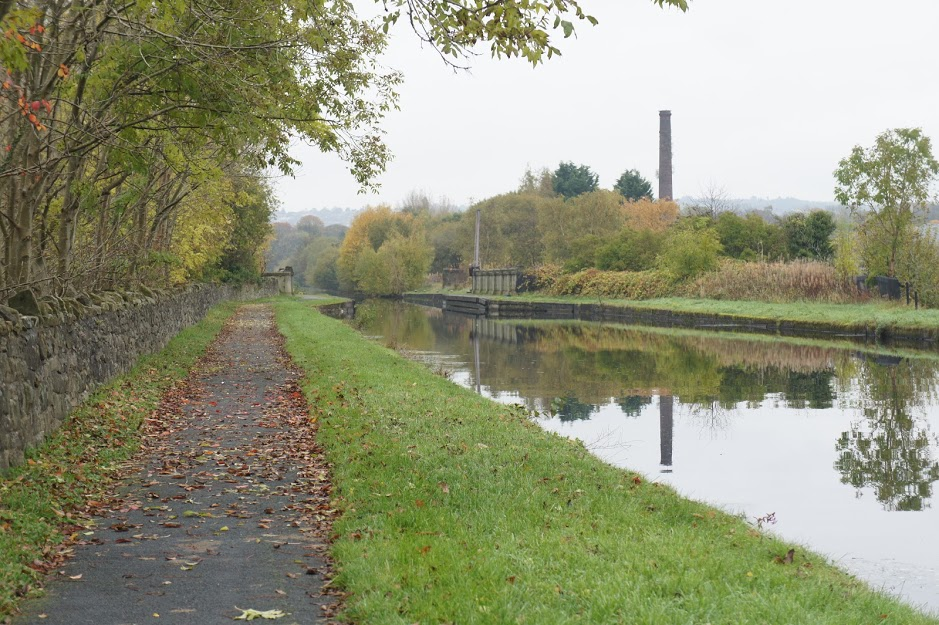
The central part of the embankment, with the chimney of Central Mill visible

Another change that may have influenced the altered route of the canal was the rapid growth in the cotton industry here after 1780. The area between the south end of Church Street and the embankment became dominated by factories during the early 19th century. The earliest factory development was Scar Top Mill, built as a woollen mill in 1787 and later used for cotton spinning. This was joined by Hill Top Mill in 1820 and Rishton Mill after 1830. Later they were extended, with Hill Top and Rishton mills expanding up the embankment to access to the towpath.

By the turn of the 20th century, twelve mills were operating alongside the embankment—all but two of which supported the town's textiles industry. Their location was likely influenced by the decision the canal proprietors took in the 1840s to allow water to be taken from the canal to power the mill engines. The embankment, carrying the canal 60 feet (18 m) above the mills, provided a suitable head of water for the mill owners and sluices were built to control abstraction. Both Hill Top and Rishton mills, once among the town's largest cotton mills, were demolished to make way for an Odeon Cinema which was built in 1937.

Other businesses which used the embankment included three corn mills that had been established on the western side by 1851. The oldest, built in 1809 a little way south of Yorkshire Street, had already been converted for other uses. Both Hill Top, built around 1838, and Pilling Field (1825) mills had been constructed up the embankment, with direct access to the towpath. Pilling Field—also known as Aqueduct Mill—was the last corn mill to close in Burnley; production ended in 1912 and it was demolished in 1939 after John Greenwood and Sons was taken over by Rank Hovis McDougall. Also at the north end, a 200-yard (180 m) rope walk was established on the embankment, parallel to the canal.

=== Influence on Burnley ===
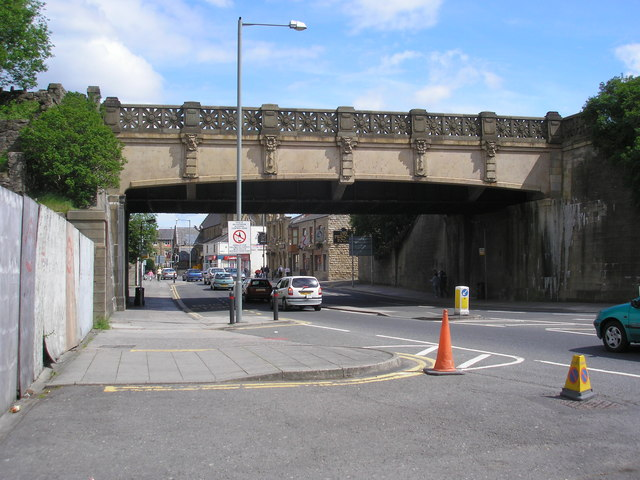
The Culvert aqueduct over Yorkshire Street in 2007

The canal embankment shaped the built environment in Burnley. At the time of its construction, the embankment was on the periphery of the town centre and followed a route through open fields. With Burnley becoming a port on the canal, the town expanded during the 19th century—the population doubled in the first 20 years—and land near the canal was used for terraced housing (including some back-to-backs) and numerous cotton mills, warehouses and wharves.

Although the arrival of the canal was a very significant event in the growth and development of Burnley, stimulating the local textile and coal trade, the embankment became a physical barrier to the eastward expansion of the town. By 1851, buildings occupied much of the space on the western side, but only a small area around the recently opened St Mary's Church to the east. At this time Burnley Wood was still developing as a discrete settlement. In 1878 Godley Lane was closed to be replaced by Ormerod Road, and the Finsley Gate swing bridge was replaced with a fixed one in 1885.

Two side tunnels (known as the "gimlet holes") were added to The Culvert in 1896 to allow pedestrians to cross the embankment without using the main portal. The entire Culvert was rebuilt in 1926 and 1927, increasing the height and widening the aperture to 70 feet (21 m)—the 1797 structure (and additional pedestrian tunnels) were no longer suitable for the increased traffic, the expansion of the Burnley Corporation Tramways, and the introduction of double-decker bus services.

On the aqueduct is a crane, used for the movement of stop planks to temporarily dam the canal for maintenance.

== Legacy ==
In 1997, the aqueduct over the River Calder, situated within the embankment, was given Grade II listed status. The four lime kilns near The Culvert gained the same status at the same time. In June 2012, a Transport Trust Red Wheel commemorated the engineering of the waterway, stating that it was the "largest canal embankment in Britain".

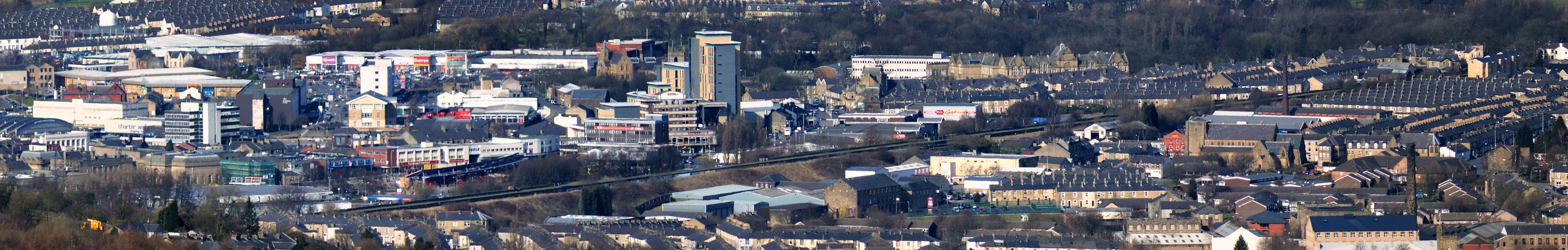
Viewed from hills to the southeast, the embankment can be seen crossing Burnley town centre. The trees in the background on the right are in Thompson Park. The steeple-less St Mary's Church on Yorkshire Street can be seen in the midground, and in the isolated group of trees centre-left foreground, near the curving purple roof of the bus station, mark the site of the Calder aqueduct.

== See also ==
- Burnley Way
- Pennine Cycleway (NCN68)
- Listed buildings in Burnley
- Weavers' Triangle
