= Thompson Park (Burnley) =

Park in Burnley, United Kingdom

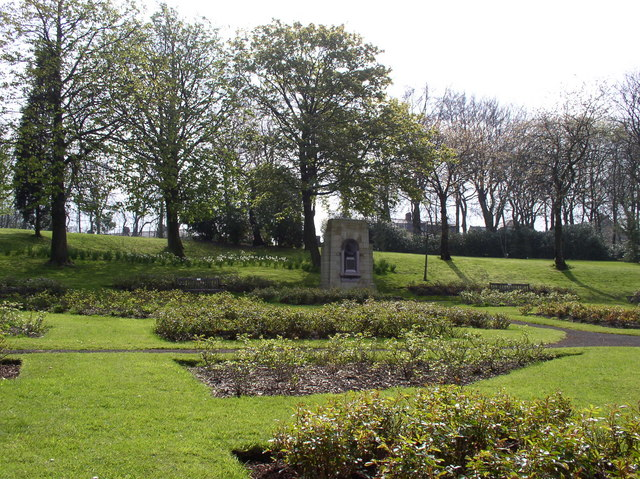
- Gardens in Thompson Park
- Interactive map of Thompson Park
- Type: Public
- Location: Burnley, Lancashire
- Coordinates: 53°47′45″N 2°14′13″W
- Created: 1930
- Operator: Burnley Borough Council
- Status: Grade II English Heritage
- Awards: Green Flag

Thompson Park is a formal Edwardian park in Burnley, Lancashire. It was opened to the public in 1930.

Located near the town centre, features include a boating lake, paddling pool, Italian gardens and a playground. Largely ornamental by design, the park contains a large number of flower beds and a rose garden. Dogs are banned from entering the park.

The land that the park occupies was part of the estate of Bank Hall. Historically known as Bank Top, it was acquired by a colliery-owner, the Rev. John Hargreaves, who had built the hall on Colne Road by 1796. Later inherited by Charlotte Anne Hargreaves, it became the home of herself and her husband, General Sir James Yorke Scarlett, a hero of the Battle of Balaclava. As the couple produced no children, the hall and shares in the executors of John Hargreaves' company passed to Charlotte's sister, Eleanor Mary, who was married to the Rev. William Thursby, and thus came under the control of the Thursby family. The company's Bank Hall Colliery, the town's largest and deepest coal mine, was developed from 1865 on land to the northeast of the park.

The lands of the estate gradually diminished as the town expanded. In 1878 Godley Lane, which curved along the southwest boundary, was closed to be replaced by the straight Ormerod Road. In 1888, Sir John Hardy Thursby donated 11.2 hectares (28 acres) to the town to create Queens Park, which lies to the east. The town's education committee constructed a building at the south end to house the technical, art and girls high schools, which opened in 1909. John's son, Sir J O S Thursby, also gave land to the town, lying between Bank Hall and Burnley Central railway station which opened as Thursby Gardens in 1910. The hall itself was sold in 1916, becoming a maternity hospital.

In 1920, a local cotton mill owner, James Witham Thompson, bequeathed £50,000 to the council to build a public park (equivalent to about £1.9 million in 2018). The council obtained the option to purchase the land from Sir J O S Thursby, completing the transaction in October 1922. Construction work began in 1928 and the official opening took place on 16 July 1930.

The River Brun runs through the park, with the Leeds and Liverpool Canal forming its eastern boundary. The double-arched Sandy Holme Aqueduct carries the canal over the river at the park's northern tip. The land on the south-east of the river was previously farmland, a plantation, and allotments, with the area on the other bank formerly part of the grounds of the hall. A weir was constructed to provide a water supply to the approximately 1.2-hectare (3.0-acre) boating lake and a paddling pool. Two bridges were built over the river and an ornamental bridge over the lake. A rose garden, herbaceous garden and Italian garden were laid-out, and a 22-metre (72 ft) by 8.4-metre (28 ft) conservatory was erected for exotic plants. Additional buildings included a boathouse, a tea-room pavilion and a lodge house, with much of the work done by the unemployed under the supervision of the council.

The park also contains a memorial, erected shortly after it opened, commemorating Dr James Mackenzie, a pioneering Scottish cardiologist who spent over 25 years as a general practitioner in the town. The memorial consists of a bronze bust by L. F. Roslyn set in a pink granite niche in a sandstone wall with stepped sides and top. The niche is round-headed with a bronze garland around the top, and with the life-sized bust standing on an inscribed pedestal.

During World War II the park was used for growing vegetables and the only bomb to fall on Burnley landed near the conservatory on 27 October 1940. In the 1970s an open air school on the northern side of the park was demolished and the park expanded into the area.

In 2017, the local council received a grant of £861,000 towards the cost of restoring the park and celebrating its heritage. Work began in the August of that year.

Thompson Park is listed as a Grade II public park by English Heritage and has also been awarded the Green Flag Award for its high standards.

== See also ==
- Listed buildings in Burnley
