= Listed buildings in Burnley =

Burnley is a town in Lancashire, England. Its unparished area contains 190 buildings that are recorded in the National Heritage List for England as designated listed buildings. Of these, one is listed at Grade I, the highest of the three grades, three are at Grade II*, the middle grade, and the others are at Grade II, the lowest grade.

Burnley was originally a market town, having been granted the right to hold a market from 1294, and it was surrounded by farmland. Much of this changed with the arrival of the Industrial Revolution. The Leeds and Liverpool Canal came to the town from Leeds in 1796, continuing west in 1801, finally connecting to Liverpool in 1816 and the town then developed into a major cotton town. Its population rose from about 4,000 in 1801 to over 97,000 a century later. During the second half of the 19th century it became "one of the most important cotton-weaving towns in the world". The number of looms in the town rose from 9,000 in 1850 to 79,000 in 1900, and more large mills were built in the early years of the 20th century.

In 1974 the borough of Burnley was established, which included the town of Burnley and surrounding towns, villages and countryside. Many of the outlying areas continued to be civil parishes, but the town of Burnley itself is unparished. This list contains the listed buildings in the unparished area of Burnley. The listed buildings in the outlying civil parishes are included in separate lists.

The listing buildings in the unparished area of Burnley reflect its history. Most of the oldest buildings originated as farmhouses or farm buildings, and also include the parish church, the country house Towneley Hall, and structures associated with these. Later there are structures associated with the Leeds and Liverpool Canal, and with the East Lancashire Railway, which arrived in the town toward the middle of the 19th century. The later buildings include industrial buildings, in particular cotton mills, together with houses for their workers, and villas for those who became wealthy at the time. There are also the buildings common to all towns, such as churches, schools, public houses, shops, banks, offices, a music hall, structures in public parks, and civic buildings.

== Key ==
Grade	Criteria
I	Buildings of exceptional interest, sometimes considered to be internationally important
II*	Particularly important buildings of more than special interest
II	Buildings of national importance and special interest

== Buildings ==
Name and location	Photograph	Date	Notes	Grade
Cross of St Paulinus; 53.79386°N 2.24083°W		c. 1295	Historically believed to be a preaching cross linked to the 7th-century mission of St Paulinus, it is now thought more likely to be the market cross from the town's first market. It was moved to another site in about 1617, and to the garden of the Burnley College Adult Training Centre in 1881. It is a millstone grit monolith on a square base. It is about 3 metres (9.8 ft) high, has a rectangular plan, and a tapering shaft with a damaged wheel-head top.	II
Towneley Hall; 53.77385°N 2.22248°W		c. 1400	A country house later used as a museum and art gallery, it was altered and extended repeatedly until the middle of the 19th century; this has resulted in a building with a U-shaped plan consisting of a hall flanked by two wings. It is in sandstone with slate roofs, and mainly in Gothic style. The hall range and the southeast wing have two storeys, and the northwest wing has three storeys, all rising to the same height. On the corners are four-storey turrets. Inside the hall is fine 18th-century plasterwork.	I
St Peter's Church; 53.79265°N 2.23992°W		15th century	St Peter's is the parish church of Burnley, its oldest part being the tower, with numerous alterations and expansions since. It is built in sandstone with slate roofs, and is in Perpendicular style. The church consists of a nave with a clerestory, aisles of unequal width and length, a south porch, a chancel and a west tower. The tower is in four unequal stages with a west doorway and window, a southeast stair turret, clock faces, and an embattled parapet with intermediate and corner pinnacles and an elaborate weathervane.	II*
Foldy's Cross; 53.77205°N 2.22538°W		1520	A commemorative cross, originally in St Peter's Churchyard, later moved to Towneley Park, and restored in 1908–11. It is in sandstone and stands on a base of seven 20th-century steps, with a moulded plinth having inscribed panels. On the plinth is a restored octagonal shaft, an original moulded cap, and an ornately carved cross.	II
Heasandford House; 53.79980°N 2.22677°W		Early 16th century (probable)	Originally a manor house, later extended and altered, and then divided into five dwellings. It is in sandstone with roofs of stone-slate and Welsh slate. The building has a U-shaped plan, with two storeys, attics and cellars, and a main range of three bays, now stuccoed.	II
Market cross and stocks 53.79368°N 2.24082°W		Early 16th century	The stocks are earlier than the market cross that was erected in about 1617, and they were moved into the garden of the Burnley College Adult Training Centre in about 1881. The cross is in gritstone, and consists of an octagonal base on a step, a plinth, and a large monolithic pedestal. The step of the cross served as the seat for the stocks, which consist of two low jambs and a damaged sill.	II
Green Hill Bowling Club; 53.78430°N 2.25272°W		Early 17th century	Originally a farmhouse, remodelled in the 19th century, and later used as a club house, it is in painted sandstone with a stone-slate roof. There are two storeys and a four-bay front. In the second bay is a two-storey gabled projecting porch with a Tudor arched doorway. The windows are mullioned.	II
Lower Howorth Fold Farmhouse; 53.77764°N 2.24232°W		Early 17th century	The farmhouse was extended in the 18th and 19th centuries. It is in sandstone, partly rendered, and has stone-slate roofs. The house is in two storeys with a basement. Its plan consists of two unequal bays, with a short parallel wing at the front, and a service wing at the rear. The doorway is Tudor arched with an inscribed lintel, and most of the windows are mullioned. In the basement is some timber-framed partitioning with wattle and daub infill.	II
Former Malt Shovel Public House; 53.79775°N 2.26061°W		17th century	Originating as Clifton farmhouse and cottage, it has since been adapted for other purposes, including as a public house. A large extension was added in the 19th century. The building is in sandstone, the older part with s stone-slate roof, and the extension with Welsh slate. The 17th-century part has an L-shaped plan, and is in two low storeys. The extension consists of a parallel range and a cross-wing to the east. It has two higher storeys and is in simple Jacobean style.	II
Towneley Farmhouse and cottages 53.77201°N 2.21937°W		17th century	The farmhouse was extended in the 19th century and has been divided into three dwellings. It is in sandstone, the original part with a stone-slate roof, and the addition is slated. Both parts have two storeys, the original part has three bays and a variety of windows. The 19th-century extension has mullioned windows containing sashes.	II
Cherryfold; 53.77979°N 2.27075°W		1687	Originally a farmhouse with attached barn and shippon, and there were later alterations and additions resulting in a single house. It is in sandstone with a stone-slate roof. The former farmhouse has two low storeys, the left part contains a six-light mullioned window in each floor, and the right has a doorway and three light casement windows on the right. The former barn is on the left, it projects forward and has been altered.	II
Barn, Towneley Farm; 53.77229°N 2.22026°W		Late 17th or early 18th century	A barn with an integral shippon in sandstone with a slate roof. It has a T-shaped plan consisting of a main range and a porch-wing. The porch has three storeys and three bays, and contains a wagon entrance and mullioned windows. The main range also has mullioned windows, together with doorways and blocked ventilation slits.	II
Finsley House; 53.78350°N 2.23948°W		c. 1700	Giving its name to the Finsley Wharf on the Leeds and Liverpool Canal, this rendered sandstone house with a stone-slate roof was remodelled in about 1790–96. It has an L-shaped plan, with two storeys and a symmetrical three-bay front. There is a central doorway, and the windows are 20th-century casements. On the right side is a single-storey gabled porch.	II
Kibble Bank Farmhouse; 53.81440°N 2.22284°W		c. 1700	The former farmhouse is in sandstone with a stone-slate roof, and has two storeys, a symmetrical two-bay front and a rear wing. The central doorway has a 20th-century porch, and there are two two-light mullioned windows on each floor.	II
Hufling Hall; 53.78004°N 2.23525°W		Late 17th century or early 18th century	Originally a farmhouse, later divided into two dwellings, it is in sandstone, the front rendered, and with a stone-slate roof. It has two storeys and three bays with a gabled porch. The windows are mullioned.	II
Old Oak Cottage; 53.78658°N 2.28906°W		Early 18th century (probable)	A sandstone cottage with a stone-slate roof. It has two low storeys, and a symmetrical two-bay front with a central doorway. The windows are 20th-century casements resembling sashes.	II
Royle Hall Farmhouse; 53.80599°N 2.26052°W	—	Early 18th century	The building originated as two cottages, with later extensions at the north and to the rear, forming a single farmhouse. It is in sandstone with a stone-slate roof, and has two low storeys. There have been alterations to the doorways and windows; some mullioned windows have been retained.	II
Shorey Well; 53.79369°N 2.24067°W		1736	The superstructure of a public well that was moved into the garden of the Burnley College Adult Training Centre (former Burnley Grammar School) probably in 1881. It is in sandstone and contains a monolithic rectangular basin, the overall dimensions being about 2 metres (6 ft 7 in) long and 0.5 metres (1 ft 8 in) high.	II
Howorth Fold Poultry Farmhouse; 53.77788°N 2.24229°W		1748	A sandstone farmhouse with stone-slate roofs, in two storeys and two bays. It has a central doorway with a moulded architrave. There are pairs of mullioned windows to the left of the doorway, and 20th-century casement windows to the right. Above the doorway is a carved plaque containing an urn, masks, initials, and the date.	II
Back Lane Farmhouse; 53.77946°N 2.27110°W		18th century (probable)	A farmhouse with attached barn and shippon in sandstone. The barn and shippon are the older part, the farmhouse probably from the 19th century. The farmhouse has a stone-slate roof, it is in two storeys with a three-bay front, and has a lower single-bay extension to the left. The central doorway has a segmental pediment, and the windows are casements. The barn and shippon have a corrugated sheet roof, and contain a wagon entrance and a blocked doorway.	II
Milestone; 53.78872°N 2.23241°W		c. 1759–60	The milestone is set into the perimeter wall of Turf Moor football ground, and served the turnpike road from Burnley to Todmorden and Halifax. It is a sandstone monolith about 0.5 metres (1 ft 8 in) wide and 1.5 metres (4 ft 11 in) high with a very worn inscription.	II
Towneley Golf Club Clubhouse; 53.77653°N 2.23243°W		Mid-to-late 18th century	Originally a farmhouse, it was later converted into a golf clubhouse, shop and cottage. The building is in sandstone with stone-slate roofs, and has two storeys. The main range has a symmetrical three-bay front with a central doorway and mullioned windows. There is a set-back single-bay extension to the right, and beyond that is a former barn.	II
Stables, Royle Hall Farm; 53.80622°N 2.26046°W	—	Late 18th century (probable)	The stables are in sandstone with a stone-slate roof, and have a rectangular plan. They have two storeys and a three-bay front. There is a central doorway with monolith jambs, a large lintel, and a cornice. To the right is a three-light stepped mullioned window, and to the left is an inserted garage door. The upper storey contains a round pitching hole.	II
Swan Inn; 53.78891°N 2.24222°W		Late 18th century	Originally a farmhouse, an extension was added to the left, and it was later used as a public house. The building is in sandstone with a composition tile roof, and is in two storeys with a three-bay front. The right two bays are symmetrical and contain a central doorway and mullioned windows. The left bay also has a doorway with a window above. All the windows are sashes.	II
Crafts Museum, Towneley Park; 53.77413°N 2.22315°W		1790	The building originated as a brew house and laundry, and was converted into a crafts museum in 1868–70. It is in sandstone with a stone-slate roof, and has a rectangular plan. There are two storeys and a three-bay front. The windows are mullioned.	II
Stable Café; Towneley Park; 53.77468°N 2.22248°W		c. 1790	Originally the stables and coach house to Towneley Hall, it was converted into a café in 1951 and extended in 2007. The building is in sandstone with a hipped slate roof, in two storeys with a four-bay front. In the ground floor are three segmental-headed wagon doorways, now glazed, and in the upper floor are sash windows.	II
Canal Bridge; 53.79638°N 2.24027°W		c. 1790–96	The bridge, No. 131, carries the A692 Colne Road over the Leeds and Liverpool Canal. It is in sandstone, and consists of a single semi-elliptical arch with rusticated voussoirs, and a parapet with ridged coping. The bridge was widened on the east side in about 1862–71.	II
Lodge Canal Bridge; 53.81002°N 2.24358°W		1790–96	Bridge No. 134 carries Barden Lane over the Leeds and Liverpool Canal. It is in sandstone, and consists of a single semi-elliptical arch with rusticated voussoirs, and has rectangular terminal piers. On the south side is a metal 20th-century footbridge.	II
New Hall Bridge; 53.80227°N 2.24453°W		1790–96	The bridge carries New Hall Street over the Leeds and Liverpool Canal. It is in sandstone, and consists of a single semi-elliptical arch with rusticated voussoirs, and has rectangular terminal piers. On the humped deck are remains of sandstone paving.	II
Sandy Holme Aqueduct; 53.79703°N 2.23447°W		c. 1790–96	The aqueduct carries the Leeds and Liverpool Canal over the River Brun and an adjacent footpath in Thompson Park. It is in sandstone and consists of two horseshoe arches with coped parapets, and sloping concave abutment walls with rectangular terminal piers.	II
Fishwicks Cottages; 53.79094°N 2.24022°W		1790–1800	A row of four cottages, the left end of which was formerly a handloom weaving workshop, all later converted for business use. They are in sandstone with roofs partly of stone-slate and partly of asbestos sheeting. The building has three storeys, and openings including a plain doorway, a shop front, and windows including sashes and mullioned windows.	II
Aqueduct; 53.78632°N 2.23867°W		1795–96	The aqueduct carries the Leeds and Liverpool Canal over the River Calder. It is in stone and consists of a single semicircular-headed arch with radiating voussoirs. There are pilasters on the sides and squared coping.	II
Canal bridge 53.78626°N 2.24618°W		c. 1796	Bridge No. 130B carries Manchester Road over the Leeds and Liverpool Canal, and it was widened in the middle of the 19th century. It is in sandstone and consists of a single elliptical arch with rusticated voussoirs, and a parapet with flat coping. On the south side is a cast iron walkway.	II
Lime kilns 53.78925°N 2.23663°W	—	c. 1796–1800 (probable)	The four lime kilns are attached to the retaining wall of the Burnley Embankment on the Leeds and Liverpool Canal. The wall is in sandstone, and the kilns are set in a canted projection. They are in pairs, and each consists of a low segmental arch with plain voussoirs.	II
South warehouse, Manchester Road Canal Wharf; 53.78662°N 2.24632°W		c. 1796–1800	The warehouse was built for the Leeds and Liverpool Canal Company, and has an integral cottage to the south. It is in sandstone with a stone-slate roof, with two storeys and a five-bay front. On the front are segmental-headed loading doorways, three-light mullioned windows, and the iron footing and jib-head of a former crane. The cottage has a two-storey canted bay window.	II
Sandygate Canal Bridge; 53.78908°N 2.25182°W		c. 1796–1802	The bridge carries Sandygate over the Leeds and Liverpool Canal. It is in sandstone, and consists of a single semi-elliptical arch with rusticated voussoirs, coped parapets, and curved abutments. A cast iron pipe crosses its north side.	II
Gannow House; 53.78976°N 2.27029°W		c. 1797	The house was built for Samuel Fletcher, the engineer of the Leeds and Liverpool Canal. It is situated close to the west portal of the Gannow Tunnel. Built of sandstone with a stone-slate roof, it has two storeys and a symmetrical south front facing the canal. There is a central doorway with a 20th-century gabled porch. All the windows are mullioned and contain altered glazing.	II
Old Vicarage; 53.78981°N 2.27010°W		c. 1797	This originated as the stables and coach house to Gannow House, and was later enlarged and used as a vicarage. It is in sandstone with a slate roof, and has two storeys. The plan is irregular; the former stable range has a cottage at the northeast corner and a domestic addition to the south with a symmetrical three-bay front. The stable range contains a wagon doorway, a stable door, and windows.	II
East Portal, Gannow Tunnel; 53.79270°N 2.26327°W		c. 1797–1801	The tunnel carries the Leeds and Liverpool Canal, and the portal is in sandstone. It consists of a semicircular arch with rusticated voussoirs, decorated pilasters and spandrels, a coped parapet, and full-height abutments.	II
West Portal, Gannow Tunnel; 53.78909°N 2.26802°W		c. 1797–1801	The tunnel carries the Leeds and Liverpool Canal, and the portal is in sandstone. It consists of a semicircular arch with rusticated voussoirs, decorated pilasters and spandrels, a coped parapet, and full-height abutments.	II
304, 306 and 308 Lowerhouse Lane; 53.79041°N 2.29356°W		Late 17th or early 18th century	A row of three sandstone cottages with a stone-slate roof. They have two low storeys, and in each house is a doorway with monolith jambs and lintel. All the cottages have one sash window on each floor.	II
11 and 13 Marsden Road; 53.81043°N 2.21833°W		Late 17th or early 18th century	Originally a pair of cottages, later joined into a single house. It is in sandstone with a stone-slate roof, with two storeys and four bays. The doorways are in the centre with a 20th-century porch. Flanking these are three-light mullioned windows, and in the upper floor are four windows, all with altered glazing.	II
25 and 27 Marsden Road; 53.81035°N 2.21931°W		Late 17th or early 18th century	A pair of sandstone cottages with a stone-slate roof and a rendered gable. They are in two low storeys, No. 25 has two bays, and No. 27 has one. The doorways have monolithic jambs and lintels, and No. 25 has a two-light mullioned window in the ground floor. The upper floor windows are casements.	II
Wall and gate piers, Manchester Road Canal Wharf; 53.78655°N 2.24586°W		c. 1800 (probable)	The boundary wall and gate piers are in sandstone. The wall has rounded coping, and is about 15 metres (49 ft) long, curving at the ends. The gate piers are square monoliths, about 2 metres (6 ft 7 in) high, each with a chamfered plinth, a plain cornice, and a deeply undercut cap.	II
Retaining wall, St Peter's Churchyard; 53.79287°N 2.24059°W		c. 1807 (probable)	The wall surrounds the north and west sides of the churchyard of St Peter's Church overlooking the River Brun. It incorporates earlier material, and is in sandstone. The wall has round coping, and it diminishes in size from about 10 metres (33 ft).	II
Wall and gates, St Peter's Churchyard; 53.79263°N 2.23932°W		c. 1807	The wall surrounds part of the churchyard of St Peter's Church, and is in sandstone. It contains two gateways, both of which are flanked by tall octagonal piers in Gothic style. These have panelled faces, moulded tops, and caps in the form of pinnacles.	II
Hand Bridge; 53.78545°N 2.23197°W		1817 (possible)	The bridge carries the A671 Todmorden Road over the River Calder. It is thought to date from when the road was turnpiked, although it carries the date 1866. The bridge was widened on the west side in the 20th century. It consists of a single low semi-elliptical arch, and on the east side are rusticated voussoirs, some decoration including faces and the date, a parapet with rounded coping, and a terminal pier.	II
58A–62 Bank Parade, 1 and 3 Raws Street; 53.79217°N 2.24124°W		c. 1820–25	Originally a terrace of three houses by Anthony Back, later used for other purposes. They are in sandstone with slate roofs, and have three storeys and cellars. Each house has two bays, and a doorway to the left with a moulded architrave and a cornice. The windows are sashes. On Raw Street are four bays, a similar doorway, and a single-storey extension.	II
64, 66 and 68 Bank Parade; 53.79233°N 2.24133°W		c. 1820–25	Originally a terrace of three houses by Anthony Back, later used as offices. They are in sandstone with slate roofs, and have three storeys and cellars. Each house has three bays, and a doorway to the left with a moulded architrave, a cornice, and a rectangular fanlight. The windows are sashes. On the right are two bays, and a two-bay, two-storey extension.	II
4 and 6 Bankhouse Street; 53.79235°N 2.24164°W		c. 1820–30	A pair of houses, later used as workshops, and then as offices. They are in sandstone with slate roofs, they have two storeys and cellars, and each house is in two bays. The doorways are to the right, and the windows are sashes.	II
2–22 Lowerhouse Fold; 53.79124°N 2.28998°W		c. 1820–30	A row of eleven workers' sandstone cottages, most with stone-slate roofs. They are in two low storeys, and each cottage has a plain doorway and one window in each floor. All have altered glazing.	II
204–238 Lowerhouse Lane; 53.79092°N 2.28976°W		c. 1820–30	A row of 18 workers' sandstone cottages, two converted into shops, and most with stone-slate roofs. They are in two low storeys, and each cottage has a plain doorway with a fanlight, and one window in each floor. All have altered glazing.	II
217–227 Lowerhouse Lane; 53.79099°N 2.29035°W		c. 1820–30	A row of six workers' sandstone cottages, two with stone-slate roofs, and four with Welsh slates. They are in two low storeys, and each cottage has a plain doorway and one window in each floor. All have altered glazing.	II
274–298 Lowerhouse Lane; 53.79054°N 2.29304°W		c. 1820–30	A row of 13 workers' sandstone cottages, some rendered, and most with stone-slate roofs. They are in two low storeys, and each cottage has a plain doorway. Most cottages have one window to each floor but Nos. 284 and 298 have two in the upper floor. All have altered glazing.	II
Spring Hill; 53.78456°N 2.25021°W		c. 1820–30	A villa that was later enlarged, built in sandstone with a hipped slate roof, and in Georgian style. It has an L-shaped plan, with two storeys, an attic and a basement, and a symmetrical three-bay front. Four steps lead up to a central porch with panelled pilasters, a plain frieze, and a moulded cornice. The windows are sashes.	II
89 and 91 Church Street; 53.79319°N 2.23950°W		c. 1820–35	A pair of sandstone houses with stone-slate roofs in three storeys. No 89 is the wider, and each house has one window on each floor, and a plain doorway. The windows have been altered.	II
Forge; 53.78330°N 2.24020°W	—	Early 19th century	Located at Finsley Wharf, the forge was built for the Leeds and Liverpool Canal Company. It is in sandstone with a composition tile roof, and is a small single-storey rectangular building. On the front are two windows, one of which is mullioned, and a doorway. The rear is built back-to-earth, To the left is a 20th-century sandstone extension.	II
The Goit; 53.79182°N 2.24023°W	—	Early 19th century	The rebuilding of a medieval mill race alongside the River Brun, serving the town's historic corn mill. It is in sandstone and has a paved surround, and is about 2 metres (6 ft 7 in) wide and 15 metres (49 ft) long.	II
Gate piers and cart shed, Royle Hall Farm; 53.80598°N 2.26024°W	—	Early 19th century (probable)	All in sandstone, the gate piers are about 3 metres (9.8 ft) high, with moulded cornices and pedestals. They are attached by screen walls to a two-bay cart shed with a stone-slate roof. This is open-fronted and has a pier in the centre and another attached to the wall.	II
St Mary's Presbytery; 53.78863°N 2.23419°W		Early 19th century	Originally two town houses, later converted into St Mary's Presbytery and part of a Franciscan convent. It is mainly in sandstone and has a slate roof. There are two storeys and a front of five bays, with a two-bay extension to the left. The building has two doorways, each with a moulded architrave, and a cornice on scrolled consoles. The windows in the right two bays are casements, and elsewhere they are sashes. The sandstone wall along the front and sides of the garden are included in the listing.	II
The Stackhouses; 53.79180°N 2.24038°W		Early 19th century (probable)	A block of houses in sandstone with a linear plan facing the River Brun. The lower houses are in a single depth with their backs to earth, and the upper houses are in a double depth.	II
Former main entrance, Towneley Park; 53.78496°N 2.23127°W		Early 19th century (probable)	The entrance, in Gothic style, consists of a sandstone archway flanked by octagonal turrets, all embattled, and a small pedestrian entrance to the north. To the south a screen wall attaches it to a cottage, also in sandstone, with a stone-slate roof. This has two storeys and it contains arched windows in the gable ends.	II
Belle Vue Terrace; 53.79028°N 2.25516°W		Before 1827	A row of four town houses, with another added later to the right. They are in sandstone with slate roofs, and have two storeys and cellars. The earlier houses have fronts of two bays, and the later house has three. The doorways have moulded architraves, plain friezes, and moulded cornices. There are some sash windows, but most contain altered glazing, and at the rear are round-headed stair windows.	II
Proctor's Works and chimney 53.78834°N 2.24604°W		1827	Originally Cow Lane Cotton Factory, and later an iron works, it was later altered for other uses. The chimney and engine house had been added in 1844–51. The factory is built in sandstone with slate roofs, and consists of a rectangular spinning block, an engine house, and a chimney. The spinning block has four storeys and an eight-bay front. The chimney is circular on a large square stone plinth.	II
St Peter's School (east range); 53.79221°N 2.23932°W		1828	The east range of the school is in sandstone with a slate roof, and is in Gothic style. The building has a rectangular plan, it is in two storeys, and has a seven-bay front. The windows are mullioned, and at the east end is Tudor arched three-light window.	II
72 and 74 Manchester Road; 53.78652°N 2.24559°W		c. 1830–45	Originally a pair of houses, later used as offices, in sandstone with a slate roof. They are in two storeys with cellars, and have two-bay fronts. The doorways have architraves with reeded jambs, patterned friezes, and cornices on consoles. The windows of No. 72 are casements, and those of No. 74 are sashes.	II
Rockwood; 53.77917°N 2.23345°W		c. 1830–48	This originated as a villa, in sandstone with a slate roof, and was later used as a school. It has two storeys and a symmetrical front of five bays. The central bay protrudes forward and contains a Corinthian portico with a balustraded parapet and a round-headed doorway with a fanlight. Above this is a French window with a cornice on consoles. The other windows are sashes.	II
Former Cuckoo Mill; 53.79096°N 2.24744°W		c. 1833 (probable)	Originally a cotton spinning mill, and later used as a warehouse, it is built in sandstone with a slate roof. The building has a rectangular plan with three storeys and a semi-basement. It contains windows and loading bays, and attached to the west side is a two-storey engine house.	II
1 and 3 Coal Street; 53.78923°N 2.24451°W		Early to mid-19th century	A pair of sandstone warehouses flanking the entrance to Paradise Street. They are in four storeys (No.1 also has a basement), and have a gabled three-bay front to Coal Street, and four bays along Paradise Street. The gabled fronts each contains a full-height loading slot, wooden doors in all floors, and an aperture for a hoist jib. The openings vary; most of the windows are replacement sashes.	II
104–108 Hebrew Road, 1–5 Lee Green Street; 53.80091°N 2.23692°W		Early to mid-19th century (probable)	A block of six back-to-back houses, in sandstone with a slate roof. They have three storeys, one bay each, and every house has a doorway and one window on each floor.	II
71 Todmorden Road; 53.78408°N 2.23146°W		Early to mid-19th century	Originally a villa, later used for other purposes, it is in sandstone with slate roofs. The building has an L-shaped plan consisting of a main block and a service block to the rear on the right. There are two storeys, and the main block has a symmetrical three-bay front with a central doorway. This has an architrave of engaged Tuscan columns, with a frieze, a moulded cornice, and a fanlight. The service wing is lower and has a two-bay front. Most of the windows are sashes.	II
Burnley House; 53.79108°N 2.25181°W		Early to mid-19th century	Originally a row of three town houses, later integrated and used as a residential home. The building is in sandstone with a slate roof, with two storeys and cellars. Each house had a symmetrical three-bay front and a central doorway with an Ionic architrave, engaged columns, a plain frieze, and a moulded cornice. All the windows contain altered glazing. There is a single-storey receding wing at the right end, and 20th-century extensions at the rear.	II
British Waterways Burnley Operations Base; 53.78345°N 2.24043°W		Early to mid-19th century	Located at Finsley Wharf, the original part was built as a boatyard warehouse for the Leeds and Liverpool Canal. It is in sandstone with a stone-slate roof, in two storeys and a symmetrical three-bay front. The building has a central doorway, and each lateral contain two windows in each floor. To the west of this is a gabled structure, and in about 1900 a brick block was built linking the two.	II
Canal boundary marker 53.79096°N 2.26519°W		Early to mid-19th century	The boundary marker is on a former footpath over the Gannow Tunnel carrying the Leeds and Liverpool Canal. It consists of a stone slab with a rounded head inscribed with "LLC".	II
Royle Cottage; 53.80675°N 2.25769°W	—	Early to mid-19th century	A sandstone cottage with a stone-slate roof in simple Jacobean style. It has 1 1/2 storeys, and a symmetrical two-bay front with a central doorway. There are two two-light mullioned windows in each floor, those in the upper floor in gabled half-dormers.	II
Sanctuary Rock Bar; 53.78920°N 2.24639°W		Early to mid-19th century	Originally a warehouse or part of a cotton mill, later converted into a restaurant. It is in sandstone with a composition tile roof, in three storeys and a front of five bays, the left bay containing a doorway and loading bays above. There is another entrance in the fifth bay. The other bays have windows, and a balcony runs along the first floor.	II
Warehouse; 53.78601°N 2.24611°W		Early to mid-19th century (probable)	A warehouse by the Leeds and Liverpool Canal, in sandstone with a rendered front and a stone-slate roof. It has a rectangular plan, with three storeys, a basement and an attic, and is in seven bays. The sixth bay on the front has a gabled dormer with an opening for a hoist jib. This bay and the central bay on the rear have loading doors that have been reduced as windows.	II
Mount Pleasant Chapel and 79 Hammerton Street; 53.78732°N 2.24619°W		c. 1835	Originally a Methodist chapel, Later used by the Baptists, altered in about 1868–71, and a Sunday school added later in the century. It is in sandstone with slate roofs, with two storeys and a symmetrical three-bay entrance front. The pedimented outer bays project forward and contain round-headed windows. In the central bay, steps lead up to paired entrances with pilasters, and a moulded cornice. On the left is a three-storey single-bay house, and the Sunday school is in right-angles at the rear.	II
Holy Trinity Church; 53.78975°N 2.25714°W		1835–36	A Commissioners' church by Lewis Vulliamy in Early English style. It was enlarged in 1871–72, damaged by fire in 1991, and converted into flats in 1993. It is built in sandstone with a slate roof, and consisted of a nave, a chancel with a north chapel and a south vestry, and a west tower. The tower has three stages, clasping buttresses, a pair of west doorways, and an embattled parapet with octagonal corner pinnacles.	II
83–87 Church Street, 2–6 Dawson Square; 53.79311°N 2.23940°W		1837	A block of six houses on a corner site, later converted for other uses. They are in sandstone with slate roofs, and have three storeys and cellars. The comer is splayed and contains a doorway and a small pediment containing the date. There are three windows and one doorway on Church Street, and four windows and three doors in Dawson Square. Many of the windows have been altered; some are sashes and other are casements.	II
Former Habergham Eaves School; 53.78852°N 2.25217°W		1840	Originally a school, and later used as a paint warehouse, it is in sandstone, partly rendered, and with a slate roof. The building is in Tudor style, and has an E-shaped plan, with a gabled porch and gabled wings. It is mainly in a single storey, with the left wing in two storeys. The windows are mullioned. The railings in front of the building are included in the listing.	II
North warehouse, Manchester Road Canal Wharf; 53.78695°N 2.24686°W		1841–44	The warehouse is parallel to the Leeds and Liverpool Canal, it is in sandstone and has a slate roof. There are four storeys and a four-bay front, with four-storey loading bays on the front, rear and north side. On the front is a large canopy carried on cast iron beams and columns, and a smaller canopy at the rear.	II
Back Oak Cottage; 53.78655°N 2.28898°W		1842	A sandstone cottage with a stone-slate roof in Jacobean style. It has two storeys and a symmetrical front of three bays, the central bay gabled and projecting forward. This contains a doorway with a four-centred arch above which is a cross-window and an inscribed shield in the gable. The other windows are casements resembling sashes.	II
Burnley Lane Baptist Church and Institute; 53.79755°N 2.23969°W		1845	The first building was a Sunday school, later converted into an institute with an attached dwelling, and the chapel was added in 1860; together they form an L-shaped plan. They are in sandstone, the institute with a stone-slate roof, and the chapel roof slated. The institute is in two and three storeys with a five-bay front. The chapel has two storeys and a four-bay pedimented entrance front containing two doorways. Along the left side are five bays.	II
Trafalgar Mill; 53.78748°N 2.24988°W		1846	There were additions and alterations later in the century, and in 1891–92 the Walker Hey iron footbridge was built over the Leeds and Liverpool Canal to give access to the town. The mill is in millstone grit with slate roofs. The main building has three storeys, attics and basements. with fronts of 16 and five bays. On the left corner is a five-storey water and stair tower, and at the rear is a two-storey six-bay warehouse and a boiler house.	II
St Mary's Church; 53.78878°N 2.23520°W		1846–49	A Roman Catholic church by Weightman and Hadfield in Decorated style, built in sandstone with slate roofs. The church consists of a nave with a clerestory, aisles, transepts, a chancel with a north vestry and a south chapel, and a west tower. The tower is in two stages, and was never completed. It has angle buttresses, a northeast canted stair turret, a west doorway, and a large five-light west window, above which is a canopied niche containing a statue. The altar was designed by E. W. Pugin. The railings, gates and gate piers in front of the church are included in the listing.	II
Railway bridge 53.79201°N 2.25189°W		1847–48	The bridge was built to carry the East Lancashire Railway over Clifton Street. It is in sandstone and consists of a single slightly skewed segmental arch with rusticated voussoirs and imposts that are flanked by piers. The bridge has a plain frieze, a chamfered cornice, a coped parapet, and sloped concave abutments.	II
Railway viaduct 53.79269°N 2.24827°W		1847–48	The viaduct was built to carry the East Lancashire Railway over the valley of the River Calder. It is built in sandstone with freestone dressings and red brick soffits. The viaduct runs in a straight line for about 400 metres (1,312 ft) and consists of 15 semicircular arches with voussoirs.	II
4–10 Paradise Street; 53.78937°N 2.24477°W		Before 1848	A row of four (previously five) sandstone cottages since used for other purposes. They were in three low storeys, later changed to two storeys in all cottages but one. The doors are in pairs with lobby doors between. They were built before the requirements of the Public Health Act 1848, and there have been many alterations since.	II
T Robinson Prospect Terrace; 53.78907°N 2.23471°W		1848	A terrace of six town houses, some of which have been converted for other uses. They are in sandstone and have slate roofs, and are in three storeys. Each house has a two-bay front. Shop fronts have been inserted into the ground floor of some houses, some of the windows are sashes, and the glazing in other windows has been altered. At the top of the terrace there are pediments at the ends and in the centre, and on the left house is an inscribed plaque.	II
78–84 Yorkshire Street; 53.78904°N 2.23426°W		c. 1848–50	A terrace of four town houses, later used for other purposes. They are in three storeys with cellars, each house has a front of two bays, and there are extensions at the rear. The doorways have pilaster jambs, moulded imposts, and cornices. No. 80 has sash windows; the glazing in the other windows has been altered.	II
Slater Terrace; 53.78922°N 2.25232°W		c. 1848–50	A terrace of eleven cottages over a warehouse, the end two cottages later converted, overlooking the Leeds and Liverpool Canal. They are in sandstone with a hipped slate roof. Each cottage has two storeys over a single-storey warehouse, and has a doorway, and a single window in each floor. A cast iron balcony runs along the front, giving access to the doorways.	II
11, 13 and 13A Nicholas Street, 8 Grimshaw Street; 53.78809°N 2.24273°W		1849 (probable)	A row of four town houses, later used as offices, in sandstone with a slate roof. There are five bays and three doorways on Nicholas Street, and one bay and one doorway on Grimshaw Street. The Nicholas Street doorways have shallow moulded cornices, and that on Grimshaw Street has a frieze and a cornice. All the windows have altered glazing.	II
4, 6 and 8 Dugdale Street; 53.78829°N 2.24268°W		c. 1850	A row of three town houses in sandstone with a slate roof. They have three storeys and cellars, and together have a five-bay front. The doorways have plain monolith surrounds, and the glazing has been altered.	II
10, 12 and 14 Dugdale Street; 53.78817°N 2.24284°W		c. 1850	A pair of town houses in sandstone with a slate roof. They have three storeys and cellars, and each house has a two-bay front. The doorways have plain monolith surrounds, there are two sash windows, and the other windows have altered glazing.	II
5 Grimshaw Street; 53.78788°N 2.24314°W		c. 1850	A house later used as an office, in sandstone with a slate roof. It has three storeys and a two-bay front. The doorway has a moulded architrave, a cornice on consoles, and a fanlight. To the right of this is a three-light window, and in the upper floors the windows are sashes.	II
1 and 3 Nicholas Street; 53.78830°N 2.24243°W		c. 1850	A pair of town houses later used as offices in sandstone with a slate roof. They have three storeys and cellars. The entrance to No. 1 is in Red Lion Street. The doorway of No. 3 has scrolled consoles, a cornice, and a fanlight. Some of the windows are sashes, others have altered glazing.	II
5, 7 and 9 Nicholas Street; 53.78822°N 2.24258°W		c. 1850	A row of three town houses later used as offices in sandstone with a slate roof. They have three storeys and cellars, and a front of five bays. The doorways each has a shallow moulded cornice, and all the windows have altered glazing.	II
Shifters; 53.78895°N 2.24561°W		1850	A house, later converted into a public house, in sandstone with a hipped slate roof on a corner site. It has three storeys and cellars, with four bays on Hammerton Street, one on Hargreaves Street, and a splayed bay on the corner. There is a doorway in the corner bay, with large windows in the flanking bays. On the Hammerton Street front is another doorway, and the other windows are sashes.	II
Wharf master's house and toll office 53.78647°N 2.24613°W		c. 1850	Built for the Leeds and Liverpool Canal, the wharf master's house and toll office are in sandstone with slate roofs, and have since been used as a museum. The house is in two storeys, with a front of two bays containing a doorway with a fanlight and a cornice, and windows with altered glazing. The toll office is in a single storey, with a doorway and sash window on its front.	II
Industrial building attached to warehouse 53.78584°N 2.24594°W		Mid-19th century	An industrial building attached to a warehouse by the Leeds and Liverpool Canal. It is in sandstone with a corrugated sheet roof. The building has a rectangular plan, with four storeys and a basement, and a six-bay front.	II
Kay Monument; 53.79234°N 2.23998°W		Mid-19th century (probable)	The monument is in the churchyard of St Peter's Church, and commemorates members of the Kay family. It is a sandstone tomb chest with inscribed panels in polished granite. On the chest is a large superstructure consisting of pedestal with scrolled console supporters on which is an elaborate gadrooned urn.	II
Royle Lodge; 53.79726°N 2.25352°W		Mid-19th century (probable)	The entrance lodge to Royle Hall (now demolished) is in sandstone with a stone-slate roof. It has an L-shaped plan, it is in Jacobean style, and has 1 1/2 storeys. There are two gabled wings, a porch in the angle, and extensive 20th-century additions. There are mullioned windows, with some mullions missing. Associated with the lodge is a pair of square 18th-century sandstone gate piers, about 3 metres (9.8 ft) high, with ball finials, which are included in the listing.	II
Centre warehouse, Manchester Road Canal Wharf; 53.78684°N 2.24656°W		Mid-19th century (probable)	The warehouse is alongside the Leeds and Liverpool Canal. It has a trapezoidal plan, its rear wall and south gable in sandstone and its roof in slate. The front is open and has a large canopy carried on four cast iron columns. At the rear are two wagon openings.	II
Park House; 53.78384°N 2.23137°W		Mid-19th century	Originally a villa, later used as a residential home, it is in sandstone with a slate roof. There are two storeys, a cellar and an attic, and an extension to the right at the rear. The main block has a symmetrical three-bay front, with set-back single-bay wings on each side. There is a central doorway with an Ionic architrave and a fanlight. The windows in the lower floor are sashes; elsewhere they have altered glazing.	II
Spring Bank; 53.78366°N 2.23127°W		Mid-19th century	Originally a villa, later used as a residential home, it is in sandstone with a slate roof, and in two storeys. The front facing the road has four bays, with three bays on the right side. On this side is a central single-storey porch that has corner pilasters, a plain frieze, a moulded cornice, and a round-headed doorway with a fanlight. At the rear is a single-storey extension. The windows are sashes.	II
Structure adjoining Slater Terrace; 53.78943°N 2.25277°W		Mid-19th century	Originating as a warehouse, it was converted into an engine house in about 1860. Adjacent to the Leeds and Liverpool Canal, it is in gritstone with a Welsh slate roof. The building has two storeys and a six-bay front. There is a loading bay in the third bay, and the other bays contain one window in each storey. A tall chimney stack, with iron hoops, rises through the first bay.	II
Tarleton House; 53.78308°N 2.23113°W		Mid-19th century	Originally a villa, later used for other purposes, it is in sandstone with a slate roof, and has two storeys. There are three parts: a main range at right angles to the road, beyond which is a cross-wing, then a set-back service wing. The main range has a symmetrical three-bay front, with a central Ionic porch and a doorway with a fanlight. On the front facing the road ios a doorway and a fire escape. The cross-wing has a Venetian-style French window above which is a cornice with urns and a curved tympanum. Beyond this the service wing has a front of four bays.	II
Warehouse and cottage, Dugdale Wharf; 53.78990°N 2.28200°W		Mid-19th century (probable)	The warehouse and cottage are alongside the Leeds and Liverpool Canal, and are in sandstone with stone-slate roofs. The warehouse has a rectangular plan and is in two storeys. In the east gabled front is a wagon doorway with a round-headed loading doorway above, both flanked by small square windows. There are similar doorways and two windows on the canal (north) side. The cottage acts as an outshut, and has two doorways and sash windows.	II
171, 173 and 175 Manchester Road; 53.78334°N 2.25359°W		c. 1850–60	A terrace of three town houses, later used for other purposes. They are in sandstone with a slate roof, and are in late Georgian style. The houses have three storeys with cellars, and each house is in two bays. Nos. 171 and 173 have doorcases with attached columns and lotus leaf capitals, and No. 175 has Doric pilasters. Each house has a two-storey canted bay window, and most of the windows are sashes. In front of the houses are walls with square gate piers that are included in the listing.	II
29 and 31 Rose Hill Road; 53.78101°N 2.25231°W		c. 1850–60	Originally a pair of staff cottages, later converted into a single dwelling, it is stuccoed with a slate roof. The house has two storeys and an extension to the rear. On the front are four windows, all with lattice glazing; those in the lower floor have moulded hood moulds, and above the windows in the upper floor are gables.	II
1 and 3 Yorke Street, 41 Manchester Road; 53.78796°N 2.24416°W		c. 1850–60	A shop and offices in sandstone with a hipped slate roof on a corner site. There are three storeys and a basement, with five bays on Yorke Street and two on Manchester Road. The shop is on the corner with a canted doorway and shop fronts on both faces. On Yorke Street is a doorway with a moulded architrave, pilasters, and a moulded cornice on consoles. The windows are sashes.	II
295–317 Lowerhouse Lane; 53.79065°N 2.29339°W		c. 1850–80	A row of twelve workers' sandstone cottages, some rendered and/or painted, and with slate roofs. They are in two storeys, and each cottage has a plain segmental-headed doorway with a fanlight, and one window to each floor. All have altered glazing.	II
147 Manchester Road; 53.78507°N 2.25098°W		c. 1850–80	A villa, later used for other purposes, in sandstone with a hipped slate roof. It has a rectangular plan, with two storeys and cellars, and a symmetrical three-bay front. The centre bay projects forward and has corner pilasters, a plain frieze, a moulded cornice, and a low parapet with a central segmental pediment. It contains a porch and is flanked by canted bay windows. The windows are sashes.	II
Aenon Baptist Chapel; 53.78766°N 2.24097°W		1851	A Baptist chapel designed by James Green in Italianate style, later converted for use as a club. It is in sandstone with hipped slate roofs. It has two storeys with a basement, and a symmetrical three-bay front, the lower storey being rusticated. The central bay projects forward with three round-headed windows in the lower floor and a three-light window above with Corinthian columns and pilasters, and a central pediment. The outer bays contain round-headed doorways in the lower storey and segmental-headed windows above.	II
Rosedale; 53.78190°N 2.25285°W		1852	A small sandstone villa with a hipped slate roof. It has a rectangular plan with an outbuilding attached to the rear. There are two storeys and a symmetrical three-bay front. The central doorway has corner pilasters with moulded imposts and elongated entablatures, a moulded cornice, a segmental inscribed parapet, and a cast iron balustrade. The glazing in the windows has been altered.	II
Jireh Baptist Chapel; 53.78850°N 2.24070°W		1853	This was built as a Baptist chapel in sandstone with a slate roof. It has a rectangular plan, is in a single storey, and has a symmetrical entrance front with a pedimental gable. There is a central doorway with a moulded cornice, above which is an inscribed plaque.	II
Burnley Mechanics; 53.78775°N 2.24440°W		1854–55	Originally a mechanics' institute designed by James Green and expanded in 1888 by William Waddington, it has later been used as a theatre and arts centre. The building is in sandstone with felted roofs, it is the style of a palazzo. It has two storeys with a basement at the rear, and a five-bay main range at the front with a central entrance, a two-bay extension to the left, and three bays on Yorke Street. On Yorke Street is a Corinthian portico. Above both entrances are Venetian windows, and there are balconies below the windows in the upper floor.	II*
Victoria Mill; 53.78963°N 2.25441°W		1855	Originally a throstle spinning mill, it was enlarged in 1889 with the addition of weaving sheds and tower. It is in stone with slate roofs, and has an L-shaped plan. The original part has four storeys and fronts of ten and six bays, and at the right end is a seven-stage tower with round-headed windows in each stage. The weaving sheds to the right have two storeys. Now University Technical College Lancashire.	II
Rosehill House Hotel; 53.77999°N 2.25311°W		1856	Originally a villa, later a hotel, it is in sandstone with slate roofs and blue crested ridge tiles. It is in eclectic Gothic style, with two storeys and a front of five unequal bays. The first and third bays are gabled, with a single-storey porch between them. In the fifth bay is a two-storey bay window with a steep polygonal roof. All the windows are different.	II
Public Hall and Technical College; 53.78741°N 2.24377°W		1862	This was built as a hall for hire, and has since been used for various purposes, included as the town hall, and as a technical college. It is in sandstone with a slate roof, and has two storeys with a basement, and a six-bay front. The sixth bay projects forward, the fifth bay contains a pedimented two-storey porch with a doorway flanked by pilasters, above which is a panel inscribed "TECHNICAL SCHOOL". The right side is gabled and contains three tall round-headed windows with a panel over the central window reading "PUBLIC HALL".	II
Belle Vue Mill; 53.79032°N 2.25458°W		1863	A cotton weaving mill, later used for other purposes, consisting of a warehouse facing the road and weaving sheds behind. The building is in millstone grit with slate roofs. The warehouse has two storeys and a basement, and a front of eleven bays, each bay containing a two-light window in both storeys. At the left end is a vehicle entrance.	II
9 Grimshaw Street, 12 Nicholas Street; 53.78773°N 2.24278°W		1864	Designed by William Waddington for the Manchester and County Bank and later used as a Registry Office. It is in sandstone with a slate roof, and has three storeys and cellars and three bays. The doorway is to the left and has a pilastered architrave and a moulded cornice. To the right are windows separated by granite colonettes with carved capitals. In the upper floors are mullioned windows.	II
12 and 14 Hammerton Street; 53.78914°N 2.24541°W		1864	Originally a store for the Co-operative Society, later altered for other uses. It is in sandstone, standing on a corner site, and has a rectangular plan with three storeys, and four bays on each front. In the ground floor are modern shop fronts, and above the windows are sashes. On the Hammerton Street front is an inscribed plaque.	II
Newtown Mill Chimney; 53.78934°N 2.24791°W		1864	The chimney of a former cotton spinning mill, it is in sandstone. The chimney is circular, slightly tapering, and at the top is a cornice.	II
Old Red Lion Hotel; 53.78890°N 2.24246°W		1865	Replacing a farmhouse on the site, the public house is in rendered sandstone with a slate roof. It curves round a corner, has two storeys and an attic, and a front of eight bays. There is an elaborate doorway on the corner with pilasters, a large fanlight, and a cornice on large crocketed brackets carrying cast iron railings. Most of the windows on the ground floor, and all on the upper floor, are sashes. In the roof are five gabled dormers with bargeboards.	II
Park View; 53.77972°N 2.23317°W		Mid-to-late 19th century	A sandstone villa with a hipped slate roof, in two storeys and with a symmetrical three-bay front. There is a central pilastered portico with a balustered parapet and a round-headed doorway. This is flanked by single-storey canted bay windows. also with balustraded parapets. The windows in the upper floor are sashes.	II
Pentridge Mill Chimney; 53.78537°N 2.23342°W		Mid-to-late 19th century	The chimney for a cotton mill, it is in sandstone, circular, and with a cornice and an oversail.	II
Waddington Monument; 53.79244°N 2.24007°W		Mid-to-late 19th century	The monument is in the churchyard of St Peter's Church, and commemorates members of the Waddington family. It is in sandstone, and is in Gothic style, consisting of a spire on a square base. It has a decorated plinth and a carved crocketed pinnacle.	II
18 and 20 Nicholas Street; 53.78751°N 2.24316°W		1866	Designed by William Waddington for the Poor Law Union, the offices are in sandstone with a slate roof. They are in two storeys with a central four-bay hall flanked by lower offices of three and four bays. There are two doorways, that on the right being simpler, and the windows are sashes.	II
St Andrew's School; 53.80188°N 2.23551°W		1866	The school is in sandstone with a slate roof, and is in Gothic style. It is in a single storey, and has an asymmetrical T-shaped plan, with an eight-bay main range, and a long south wing. In the gable ends are large windows with Geometrical tracery, and along the sides are paired windows with hood moulds.	II
St Andrew's Church; 53.80214°N 2.23522°W		1866–67	The church was designed by J. Medland Taylor, and a baptistry was added in the 20th century. It is built in sandstone with slate roofs, and is in Gothic style. The church consists of a nave with a west baptistry, aisles, a chancel with a polygonal apse, a south chapel, a north vestry, and a southwest steeple. The steeple has a three-stage tower with a west doorway and a broach spire with lucarnes.	II
22 and 24 Nicholas Street; 53.78730°N 2.24340°W		1869	Designed by William Waddington as a hotel for the Oddfellows, and later used as offices, it is in sandstone with a slate roof. There are three storeys, with six bays on Nicholas Street and four on Elizabeth Street. The principal entrance has an elaborate architrave with a cornice on large consoles, and a fanlight. All the windows are sashes.	II
34–40 Keirby Walk; 53.78989°N 2.23927°W		c. 1870	A commercial building in sandstone with a slate in Venetian style. It has three storeys with a double basement and five bays and a splayed bay on the corner. On the ground floor are windows and doorways with segmental heads, some having short corbelled columns with crocketed caps. The windows in the upper storey are sashes with roundels in the lintels.	II
Stable block, Manchester Road Canal Wharf; 53.78692°N 2.24614°W		c. 1870–80	The stable block was built for the Leeds and Liverpool Canal Company, and is in red brick with hipped slate roofs. It consists of a central block with two storeys and three bays and wings in a single storey each with three bays. On the front are doorways with fanlights, windows and a loading doorway over which is a gablet with a hoist-jib.	II
Chimney, Oak Mount Mill; 53.78990°N 2.25192°W		c. 1870–80	The chimney of a cotton mill, it is in sandstone, and is over 37 metres (121 ft) high. The chimney consists of a tapering cylindrical shaft, and stands on a square pedestal with a frieze and a band, and with an upper stage that becomes octagonal.	II
Engine house, Oak Mount Mill; 53.79008°N 2.25224°W		c. 1870–80 (probable)	The engine house of a cotton mill, it is in brick with a slate roof and has a rectangular plan. The building is in one high storey and has four round-headed windows along the front and one in the west gable end. These have triple keystones and small-paned glazing. On the gables are ball finials. The engine and engine house are also a scheduled monument.	II
Franciscan Convent and Chapel; 53.78879°N 2.23436°W		c. 1870–1930	Constructed in three phases, the building is in sandstone with slate roofs. It has an L-shaped plan, and is in mainly two storeys with attics and cellars. The first phase has five bays and includes a first-floor chapel and a short cross-wing, and has an apsidal end. The windows are sashes with lancets in the chapel. The second phase has seven bays, sash windows and a mansard roof with dormers. The third phase, which is at right angles, has three bays and casement windows.	II
Burnley Lane Baptist Church Hall; 53.79734°N 2.23983°W		1872	Originally a Sunday school, later a church hall, the building is in sandstone with a slate roof. It has a rectangular plan in two storeys, and the symmetrical entrance front has three bays. In the centre is a pair of round-headed doorways over which is a cornice, and above is a pair of round-headed windows with a similar cornice. The outer bays contain rectangular windows in the ground floor and round-headed windows above. At the top is a pediment containing a round recess that formerly contained a clock face. Along the sides are seven bays.	II
Woodtop Primary School; 53.78727°N 2.26675°W		1873	A school, now closed, in sandstone with slate roofs and pierced crested ridge tiles in Gothic style. It has an H-shaped plan with an additional wing at the rear. The main body facing the road contains three pairs of windows, and this is flanked by gabled wings with large two-light windows, The porch is in the right angle. The forecourt of the school has a sandstone wall with railings, a pair of square gate piers, and wrought iron gates with an overthrow, which are all included in the listing.	II
Railings and gateway, Burnley College Adult Training Centre; 53.79336°N 2.24106°W		1873 (probable)	Designed by William Waddington, a low sandstone wall with railings bounds the grounds of the Burnley College Adult Training Centre. Opposite the entrance to the building is a pair of monolithic gate piers in Gothic style with pyramidal tops, between which are gates.	II
Burnley College Adult Training Centre; 53.79328°N 2.24084°W		1873–74	Originally Burnley Grammar School, it was designed by William Waddington in Elizabethan style. The school is built in sandstone with slate roofs, it has an L-shaped plan, and is mainly in two storeys. On the front is a two-storey gabled porch with an oriel window, to the left of which is a canted bay, behind which is an octagonal tower with a machiolated parapet and a pyramidal roof with a weathervane. To the left of this is a gabled wing with a larger oriel window.	II
Lodge Farmhouse; 53.81085°N 2.24566°W		1874	The farmhouse incorporates material from an adjacent early 17th-century house. It is in sandstone with a slate roof, and has an L-shaped plan, and two storeys with a cellar and attic. The front is almost symmetrical and contains a gabled single-storey porch, above which is a five-stage mullioned and transomed stair window with 15 panes.	II
Chaffer monument 53.79239°N 2.24004°W		Late 19th century	The monument is in the churchyard of St Peter's Church and commemorates members of the Chaffer family. It is in sandstone and consists of a headstone and an enclosure. The headstone is large, in Gothic style, with crocketed pinnacles, and the enclosure has low traceried walls.	II
Gate piers, Royle Hall Farmhouse; 53.80565°N 2.25745°W		Late 19th century	A pair of sandstone gate piers at the entrance to the drive. They are square, about 3 metres (9.8 ft) high, with raised bands, friezes with nailhead decoration, moulded cornices, and pedestals that formerly held ball finials.	II
Lamp post, Lowerhouse Lane; 53.79103°N 2.29001°W		Late 19th century	The lamp post has been moved from another site. It is in cast iron on a circular stone base, and consists of a foliated standard with ladder bars. It carries a Windsor lantern with a corona (or a P20 gas lantern).	II
Mill chimney and engine house 53.79231°N 2.24901°W		Late 19th century	The chimney and the engine house, now derelict, are in sandstone, with a slate roof to the engine house. The chimney is cylindrical and slightly tapering. The engine house is rectangular, in one storey, and has round-headed windows with voussoirs and wooden tracery in the heads.	II
River retaining wall, Bank Parade; 53.79276°N 2.24116°W	—	Late 19th century	The wall retains the embankment to Bank Parade above the River Brun. It is in sandstone and has cast iron spearheaded railings.	II
River retaining wall, School Lane; 53.79304°N 2.24018°W		Late 19th century	The wall retains the embankment to School Lane above the River Brun. It is in sandstone and has cast iron spearheaded railings.	II
St Peter's School (west range); 53.79208°N 2.23994°W		Late 19th century	The west range of the school is in sandstone with a slate roof, it has a rectangular plan, and is in Gothic style. The building is in one storey with a basement and has a front of four bays. The windows are mullioned and transomed. At the east end is a two-bay extension linking this range to the east range.	II
British Legion Club; 53.79212°N 2.23613°W		1876	Built for the Ancient Order of Foresters, the building is in sandstone, with 2 1/2 storeys and three bays. The central doorway has a stag's head on the keystone, and a corniced entablature containing a carved bow-and-arrow and flanked by ball finials. There is a plan doorway with a fanlight to the right, and the windows are mullioned. In the gable are two pairs of blind round-headed windows, a band, and an oculus, and it is surmounted by a finial.	II
Former National Westminster Bank; 53.78791°N 2.24266°W		1876	Designed by William Waddington for the Manchester and County Bank, the building is in sandstone with a slate mansard roof. It is on a corner site, with one storey, a cellar and an attic, and has four bays on each front with a splayed corner between. The entrance is in an archway on the corner, it is flanked by polished granite columns and above the door is a tympanum containing a carved shield. The windows are round-headed and between their heads are roundels. At the top of the building is a pierced parapet, urns, pedimented features, and cast iron finials with animals.	II
Virgil Anderton's shops 53.78904°N 2.24050°W		1876	A terrace of six shops by Virgil Anderton, in sandstone with a slate roof in Venetian style. They have three storeys, and the shops are divided by pilasters. In the ground floor are modern shop fronts, and in the upper floors there are pairs of windows (other than the first floor of the left shop). Most of the windows are sashes.	II
St Stephen's Church; 53.78240°N 2.23245°W		1876–79	Designed by James Green, the church is in sandstone with slate roofs. It consists of a nave with a clerestory, aisles, a chancel with a south vestry that has an apsidal south end, and a northwest tower with a stair turret rising to a greater height than the tower. The tower has three stages, with angle buttresses, a west doorway, a clock face, and an embattled parapet with corner gargoyles. The windows contain Geometrical tracery.	II
Angle Street Baptist Chapel; 53.80132°N 2.23711°W		1877	The former Baptist chapel has been converted into other uses. It is built in sandstone with a slate roof and has Romanesque features. The building has two storeys and a symmetrical entrance front of three bays. In the front is a pair of round-headed doorways with colonnettes and semicircular fanlights, flanked by triple staggered stair windows. In the upper storey are five round-headed windows, and there are six windows along the sides. The forecourt is bounded by railings on a low stone wall and contains two pairs of gate piers with pyramidal caps and iron gates.	II
Jamia Mosque Farooq-E-Azam; 53.80130°N 2.23753°W		1878	Originally a Baptist Sunday and day school, later used as a mosque, it is in sandstone with slate roofs, and stands on a corner site. It has an E-shaped plan with a single storey, the windows are mullioned, and there are three gables on the North Street face. To the right of these is an area bounded by a wall and railings that are included in the listing.	II
Former Burnley Cooperative Society premises 53.78916°N 2.24578°W		1885	The building was extended in 1889 and in 1899. It is probably steel-framed and has sandstone cladding and a slate roof. The building is in Renaissance style, with three storeys and a basement, and a front of eleven bays in three sections. There are modern shop fronts in the ground floor. The details in the upper storeys vary between the sections.	II
Town Hall; 53.78757°N 2.24482°W		1885–88	The town hall was designed by Holtom and Fox in Renaissance style, and is built in sandstone with slate roofs. It has an irregular rectangular plan, with three storeys and a basement, and a nine-bay front, the centre and outside bays projecting forward. Above the centre is an octagonal tower with a copper dome and clock faces. The central entrance has Ionic columns in polished pink granite with elaborate wrought iron gates, and above it is a balustraded balcony with six Composite columns. The railings around the basement area are included in the listing.	II
Duke of York Hotel; 53.80145°N 2.23594°W		1888	A public house on an acute-angled triangular site, it is in sandstone with Cumberland slate roofs, and in Jacobean style. There is a main block of three storeys and six bays, a smaller block going into the angle of two storeys and three bays, and a canted bay on the corner. The main doorway has an architrave with pilasters, moulded consoles, and a dentilled cornice. Also in the main block is an oriel window, most of the other windows being sashes with mullions. In the smaller block is another oriel window, and a clock face on the corner.	II
Boundary stone (east); 53.79790°N 2.27080°W		c. 1889	The boundary stone consists of a rectangular sandstone pillar with a rounded head. On its face is a moulded iron plaque inscribed "Burnley Municipal Borough Boundary 1889".	II
Boundary stone (south); 53.77910°N 2.23604°W		1889	The boundary stone consists of a rectangular sandstone pillar with a rounded head. On its face is a moulded iron plaque inscribed "Burnley Municipal Borough Boundary 1889".	II
Boundary stone (west); 53.79787°N 2.27097°W		c. 1889	The boundary stone consists of a rectangular sandstone pillar with a rounded head. On its face is a moulded iron plaque inscribed "Burnley Municipal Borough Boundary 1889".	II
104 St James Street, 1–7 Hammerton Street; 53.78956°N 2.24535°W		1891	A row of shops in red brick with terracotta dressings. They have four storeys, with five bays on Hammerton Street and one on St James Street. In the ground floor are modern shop fronts, and in the floors above are windows with terracotta architraves.	II
Stanley Mill; 53.80147°N 2.23331°W		1891	A cotton weaving mill in sandstone with a slate roof containing glazed lights. It consists of a large weaving shed with the main range on the west side. This has two storeys and a basement, with an engine house and a boiler house at the right end, resulting in a front of 24 bays. There is a single-storey office block in front of the first eight bays. Behind the boiler house is a tapering circular chimney.	II
Stable block, Stanley Mill; 53.80089°N 2.23289°W		c. 1891	The stable block has been converted for other uses. It is in headstone with slate roofs, and has a U-shaped plan, consisting of a main range and two wings. At the front is a screen wall with a gateway. The building is mainly in a single storey. The main range has four bays, and the gabled end of the left wing has a wagon doorway. The right wing has an attic and a gabled dormer with a loading door and a crane jib. In the gable end is a square window, above which is a lunette.	II
Drinking fountain, Queen's Park; 53.79514°N 2.23192°W		1893	The drinking fountain consists of a circular sandstone bowl lined with rendered brick carried on octagonal piers with ball finials. It is surrounded by a canopy with four pairs of polished granite Ionic order columns on a stone plinth. On top of the canopy is a dome with an obelisk finial, and on the plinth are inscribed bronze panels.	II
Empire Music Hall; 53.78940°N 2.24642°W		1894	The music hall was reconstructed in 1911 and altered later, it was later used as a cinema and then as a bingo hall. It is in rendered brick and has a roughly square plan. The 1911 interior has been largely retained, including a wide proscenium arch, elaborately decorated boxes, two curved galleries, and a coffered ceiling.	II
Imperial Chambers; 53.78816°N 2.24321°W		1894	Designed by William Waddington for the Union Bank in Renaissance style, and later used for other purposes, it is in sandstone with a slate roof in three storeys with a basement and attic. There are three bays on Manchester Road, six on Grimshaw Street, and a canted bay on the corner. The round-headed doorway is in the corner bay, over which are paired windows having elaborate cresting with ball finials. At the top of the bay is a shaped gable, the other bays having segmental gables, all with finials.	II
Scott Memorial; 53.78175°N 2.25694°W		1895	The memorial is in Scott Park and commemorates John Hargreaves Scott who gave the land for the park. It consists of an elaborate square canopy, mainly in sandstone, with three polished granite colonnettes at each corner. On the top is a central octagonal pillar carrying a flaming urn. Inside the canopy is a pedestal with a marble bust of the donor.	II
Former Plane Tree Public House; 53.79005°N 2.24960°W		1895–98	Originally a house, later remodelled into a public house, it is in sandstone and in Jacobean style. There are three storeys and a front of four unequal bays. At the top of the building is a parapet with ball finials, and two upstands flanked by obelisk finials. The round-headed doorway has an architrave with Ionic pilasters and a parapet with obelisk finials. In the right bay is a bow window. All the ground floor windows are mullioned and transomed, and some of the upper floor windows have Ionic colonnettes.	II
Church of St Catherine with St Alban and St Paul; 53.78723°N 2.23261°W		1897	Designed by J. Medland Taylor in Arts and Crafts style, the church is in yellow sandstone with dressings in red sandstone and a slate roof with red ridge tiles. It consists of a nave, a northwest tower containing a porch, a southwest wing, an external south aisle formed by a row of flying buttresses, and an apsidal chancel with a north organ house and a south chapel. The tower is in three stages and has a pyramidal roof with a finial. There is a large west window, and all the other windows are lancets.	II
Town Mouse Public House; 53.79146°N 2.24672°W		c. 1900–14	Originally known as the Salford Hotel, it is a sandstone public house with a slate roof in Edwardian Baroque style. There are two storeys, cellars and an attic containing a Venetian window. The front has five bays; the central three bays project slightly forward and have an open pediment with corner pilasters and a modillioned cornice. The doorway has Ionic columns and a frieze, and the windows are sashes.	II
Post Office; 53.78901°N 2.24514°W		1900	The Post Office has three storeys and an attic, and a front of nine bays. It is in Baroque style, standing on a granite plinth, the ground floor is in terracotta resembling stone, and the upper parts are in red brick with terracotta dressings. Above the central three bays is a gable with finials surmounted by a pedimented feature. The doorway has a granite architrave and columns, over it is a segmental canopy, and above this is an extended Venetian window. All the windows are sashes.	II
Bridge Inn; 53.79016°N 2.24178°W		1901	A sandstone public house with a slate roof in Edwardian Baroque style standing on a corner side. It has two storeys, with five bays on Bank Parade and four on Bridge Street. The splayed corner between them contains a cartouche, a window in the first floor, and at the top a pedimented feature containing an Art Nouveau design and flanked by pilasters. The doorway on Bank Parade has a pilastered architrave, a moulded lintel, a plain frieze, a dentilled cornice and a fanlight. The windows are sashes. In front of the Bridge Street face are railings with Art Nouveau panels.	II
10 Hammerton Street; 53.78924°N 2.24533°W		1905	Originally a drapery shop for the Co-operative Society, and later altered for other purposes. The building is in sandstone with dressings in polished granite, and with slate roofs, in Edwardian Baroque style. There are three storeys and a symmetrical four-bay front. In the centre of the top floor is an architrave of engaged Ionic columns with a pedimented entablature containing a cartouche. All the windows are sashes.	II
Steeple, former Methodist Church; 53.78443°N 2.25126°W		c. 1905	The church was designed by Waddington, Son and Dunkerley, and has been demolished, other than the steeple. This is in sandstone and consists of a two-stage tower and a spire. The tower contains a west doorway, windows, and bell openings, and at the top is a parapet with pinnacles. Flying buttresses pass from the pinnacles to the splay-footed spire. In front of the steeple is a balustrade, which is included in the listing.	II
Former Burnley College; 53.79318°N 2.23752°W		1905–08	Designed as a technical institute by G. H. Pickles, it has a steel frame clad in sandstone, and slate roofs. It is in free Jacobean style. The front range has two storeys and a full basement storey, and is symmetrical with nine bays. The central entrance is approached by a bridge over the basement area, it is round-headed, and above it is a cartouche, a four-light window, and a large tympanum. Other features include gables of different types, mullioned and transomed windows, and railings in front of the basement area, which are included in the listing.	II
The Castle; 53.77477°N 2.25563°W		1908	A house designed by Edgar Wood with Modernist, Arts and Crafts, and Vernacular Revival features. It is in sandstone with a flat concrete roof covered in asphalt. The house has a square plan, with a wing at the rear, in two storeys and with three bays on each side. Three steps lead up to the doorway, which has a shallow canopy, and to the right is a two-storey canted bay window. The windows are mullioned, some also with transoms, and around the top of the house is a parapet with flat coping containing pairs of small flat-headed openings, and raised over the bay window.	II
Garden wall, The Castle; 53.77482°N 2.25588°W		c. 1908	The wall was designed by Edgar Wood. It is in sandstone, it is about 2 metres (6 ft 7 in) high and raised at the ends, and has a flat coping. At the left end is a round-headed doorway.	II
Former Billiards Hall; 53.79002°N 2.25611°W		1910	The billiards hall was designed by Samuel Keighley for local table manufacturer Willie Holt, and is in millstone grit with a stone slab roof. It has two storeys and a five-bay front. The ground floor bays are divided by pilasters, and each contains two casement windows. Above these is a cornice, and in the upper floor there are three windows in each bay. On the corner is a canted entrance.	II
White Lion Public House; 53.78887°N 2.24119°W		1910	A public house by H. Thompson in sandstone with Accrington brick at the rear. It has a hipped slate, it is in Edwardian Baroque style, and stands on a corner site. The public house has three storeys and a splayed bay on the corner. The main doorway is round-headed, and has a moulded surround with a keystone, pilasters, and a cornice on consoles. There is another round-headed doorway in the corner bay, above which is a mullioned and transomed oriel window. Of the other windows, some are mullioned, and others contain sashes.	II
16 St James Street; 53.78897°N 2.24069°W		1911	A shop by H. Thompson in sandstone with a slate mansard roof in Edwardian Baroque style. It has two storeys and an attic, with a single-bay front. The ground floor contains a modern shop front, and above is a Venetian window with an architrave containing a crested cornice on consoles. This is set within a semicircular open pediment with ball finials. In the roof is a flat-topped dormer.	II
18 St James Street; 53.78889°N 2.24083°W		1911	A public house by H. Thompson in sandstone with a slate roof in Edwardian Baroque style on a corner site. It has two storeys and six bays, with two bays on St James' Street, three on Parker Street and a curved bay between. Along the top is a parapet decorated with roundels, and with a panel in a round-headed architrave on the corner. In the bays flanking the corner are doorways with pilasters and open pediments. The windows are sashes, most of them in mullioned surrounds.	II
Habergham Eaves War Memorial; 53.783645°N 2.254381°W		1922	Located outside St Matthew's Church, the war memorial was designed by J Harold Gibbons. Made of Portland stone, it has an orb set on a triangular-sectioned shaft rising from a triangular plinth standing on a circular base. On the front face of the shaft is a carved wreath encircling the text 1914 / 1919. There is an inscription on the plinth.	II
War Memorial, Towneley Park; 53.77385°N 2.22079°W		1926	The war memorial was designed by Walter Gilbert. It has a concave plinth of grey granite on which stands a wall of Portland stone, sculpted to create three figures emerging from the top, a soldier, an airman and a sailor. By the sides are bronze female figures, one bending down and holding a wreath, and the other, younger figure looking upwards and cradling flowers. There is an inscription at the foot of the wall.	II*
14 and 16 Nicholas Street; 53.78765°N 2.24296°W		1927	Built for the Borough Building Society and designed by G. and S. Keighley in sandstone. It has 2 1/2 storeys and a five-bay front. In the ground floor are two pairs of windows separated by polished granite colonnettes, and a segmental-headed doorway. All the windows are sashes.	II
Burnley Building Society; 53.78777°N 2.24225°W		1927–30	Designed by Briggs and Thornely, the offices are probably steel-framed with ashlar sandstone cladding, and are in Modernist Classical style. The offices stand on a corner site, have two storeys and a basement, with a main front of five bays on Grimshaw Street and eleven bays along Parker Street. The main front is framed by a Greek key band and contains a central doorway (converted into a window) that has an architrave with a cornice on consoles. Also on the front are four giant fluted columns with Composite capitals.	II
Central Library; 53.78771°N 2.24158°W		1928–30	The public library was designed by George Hartley in Beaux-Arts style. It has a steel frame with Darley Dale stone cladding and roofs in Cumbrian slate. The library has two storeys and a symmetrical front including a central loggia with two giant fluted Order columns flanked by square windows on each floor. Above this is a zigguratal three-stage roof.	II
Mackenzie Memorial; 53.79489°N 2.23543°W		1931	The memorial is in Thompson Park, and commemorates Dr James Mackenzie a cardiologist who spent over 25 years as a general practitioner in the town. The memorial consists of a bronze bust by L. F. Roslyn set in a pink granite niche in a sandstone wall with stepped sides and top. The niche is round-headed with a bronze garland around the top, and with the bust standing on an inscribed pedestal.	II
Prestige Building; 53.79461°N 2.24117°W		1937	The surviving section of a factory by Wallis, Gilbert and Partners, it is metal framed and in red brick with concrete dressings, in Modernist style. It has a long rectangular plan, with a two-storey centre of seven bays, and single-storey four-bay wings. In front of the centre are six concrete lamp standards, and in the centre is a square-headed doorway.	II

== See also ==
- Listed buildings in Briercliffe
- Listed buildings in Cliviger
- Listed buildings in Habergham Eaves
- Listed buildings in Hapton, Lancashire
- Listed buildings in Ightenhill
- Listed buildings in Padiham
- Listed buildings in Worsthorne-with-Hurstwood
