= Seven Wonders of the Waterways =

Notable landmarks on the waterways of the United Kingdom

The Seven Wonders of the Waterways is a list of landmarks on the navigable waterways of the United Kingdom. The list was originally compiled in 1946 by Robert Aickman, co-founder of the Inland Waterways Association (IWA), at a time when the waterways network was largely derelict. Today, the Canal & River Trust—formerly British Waterways—has jurisdiction over (and responsibility for) all of the sites except for the Barton Swing Aqueduct, which is owned and operated by the Bridgewater Canal Company.

== Background ==
In 1946, the Inland Waterways Association was formed to campaign for the conservation of navigable waterways in the United Kingdom. Robert Aickman, one of the co-founders of the association, proposed the list in his book Know Your Waterways as a method of highlighting significant feats of engineering on the canal network, as well as bringing attention to those at risk of becoming derelict. At the time of the list's publication, six of the locations were navigable. The London Midland and Scottish Railway Company Act of 1944 formally closed the Llangollen Canal, although the Pontcysyllte Aqueduct remained in use as a water feeder for the wider Shropshire Union Canal network. Aickman successfully passed through the Standedge Tunnel in Yorkshire with L. T. C. Rolt in 1948, at a time when it was closed to all other traffic and awaiting restoration from its state of disrepair. The Caen Hill Locks in Wiltshire became derelict shortly after the list's publication, with the last boat passage before restoration occurring in 1948. The Anderton Boat Lift only became inoperational for a sixteen-year period beginning in the 1980s, and the Barton Swing Aqueduct, the Bingley Five Rise Locks, and the Burnley Embankment have always—except for general maintenance—been navigable.

== List ==
Locations of the original Seven Wonders (green) and additional candidates (orange)

The original list comprises two aqueducts, two lock systems, one tunnel, one boat lift and one embankment. All but two of the sites date from around the Canal Mania period:

Name	Type	Description	Waterway	Principal engineer(s)	Location	Opened	Heritage	Coordinates	Image
Pontcysyllte Aqueduct	Navigable aqueduct	Longest and highest aqueduct in the United Kingdom	Llangollen Canal	Thomas Telford; William Jessop	Froncysyllte, Clwyd, Wales	26 November 1805; 220 years ago	UNESCO World Heritage Site; Grade I listed	52.970556°N 3.087778°W	
Standedge Tunnel	Canal tunnel	The longest, deepest, and highest canal tunnel in the United Kingdom	Huddersfield Narrow Canal	Benjamin Outram; Thomas Telford	Standedge, West Yorkshire, England	4 April 1811; 214 years ago	Grade II* listed (north portal)	53.59107°N 1.96219°W	
Caen Hill Flight	Lock flight	One of the longest continuous lock flights in the country, with a gradient of 1:44	Kennet and Avon Canal	John Rennie	Devizes, Wiltshire, England	28 December 1810; 215 years ago	Scheduled Monument	51.35253°N 2.02559°W	
Barton Swing Aqueduct	Navigable aqueduct	The world's only swinging aqueduct	Bridgewater Canal	Edward Leader Williams	Barton upon Irwell, Greater Manchester, England	1 January 1894; 132 years ago	Grade II* listed	53.4748°N 2.3521°W	
Anderton Boat Lift	Boat lift	The world's first commercially successful boat lift	Trent and Mersey Canal, River Weaver	Edward Leader Williams; Edwin Clark	Anderton with Marbury, Cheshire, England	26 July 1875; 150 years ago	Scheduled Monument	53.2728°N 2.5305°W	
Bingley Five Rise Locks	Staircase locks	Early example of staircase lock and steepest flight in the country (1:5)	Leeds and Liverpool Canal	John Longbotham	Bingley, West Yorkshire, England	21 March 1774; 251 years ago	Grade I listed	53.8558°N 1.8379°W	
Burnley Embankment	Embankment	Innovative solution to a canal crossing a wide river valley	Leeds and Liverpool Canal	Robert Whitworth	Burnley, Lancashire, England	April 1801; 224 years ago	Grade II (partial)	53.7885°N 2.237472°W	

=== Additional wonders ===
A number of other canal locations have been proposed to expand or amend the list. In 2002, British Waterways published an alternative list based on the results of a poll, which removed the Burnley Embankment and the Barton Swing Aqueduct. This list saw the first inclusion of a Scottish location, the Falkirk Wheel:

Name	Type	Waterway	Principal engineer(s)	Location	Opened	Heritage	Coordinates	Image
Falkirk Wheel	Boat lift	Forth and Clyde Canal/Union Canal	Tony Kettle (design); BWB/Arup/Butterley/RMJM	Falkirk, Stirlingshire, Scotland	24 May 2002; 23 years ago		56.000278°N 3.841667°W	
Sapperton Tunnel	Canal tunnel	Thames and Severn Canal	Robert Whitworth; Josiah Clowes	Sapperton, Gloucestershire, England	20 April 1789; 236 years ago	Grade II listed (north portal); Grade II* listed (south portal)	51.7162°N 2.0666°W	

A list published by canal multimedia production company Videoactive proposed the "New Seven Wonders of the Waterways", replacing the Caen Hill Locks, Standedge Tunnel and Burnley Embankment and introducing the only non-navigable location:

Name	Type	Waterway	Principal engineer(s)	Location	Opened	Heritage	Coordinates	Image
Foxton Inclined Plane	Inclined plane	Grand Union Canal	Gordon Cale Thomas (design)	Market Harborough, Leicestershire, England	1900; 126 years ago	Scheduled Monument	52.4998°N 0.983°W	
Harecastle Tunnel	Canal tunnel	Trent and Mersey Canal	Thomas Telford	Kidsgrove, Staffordshire, England	30 April 1827; 198 years ago	Grade II listed (both portals)	53.074167°N 2.236389°W	
Crofton Pumping Station	Pumping station	Kennet and Avon Canal	John Rennie	Great Bedwyn, Wiltshire, England	1809; 217 years ago	Grade I listed	51.35827°N 1.62511°W	

In 2015, the Canal & River Trust ran a competition to establish the Lost Wonders of the Waterways World. The resultant list highlighted three locations where canal restoration schemes are planned or underway:

Name	Type	Waterway	Principal engineer(s)	Location	Derelict	Heritage	Coordinates	Image
Horse Park Bridge	Accommodation bridge and canal bed	Lancaster Canal	John Rennie	Sedgwick, Cumbria, England	1944; 82 years ago	Grade II listed	54.281285°N 2.746755°W	
Combe Hay Locks	Lock flight	Somerset Coal Canal	William Bennet	Combe Hay, Somerset, England	1898; 128 years ago	Grade II listed	51.343878°N 2.368865°W	
Walbut Lock	Lock	Pocklington Canal	George Leather	Thornton, East Riding of Yorkshire, England	1932; 94 years ago	Grade II listed	53.888043°N 0.827573°W	
