= St Peter's Church, Burnley =

Coordinates: 53.7927°N 2.2399°W

St Peter's, Burnley
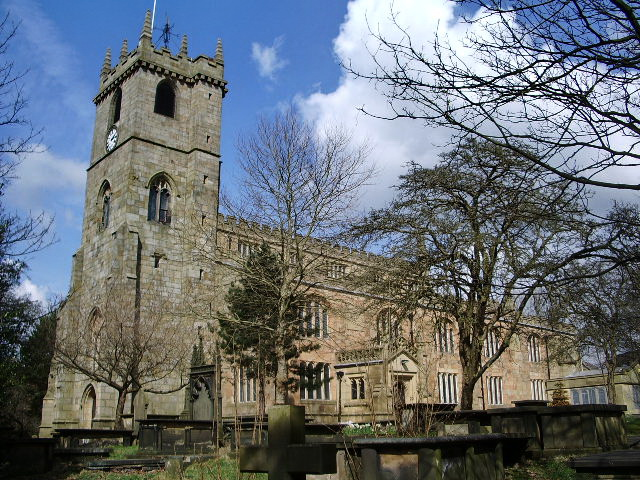
- St Peter's Church from the south

- Location in Burnley town centre
- OS grid reference: SD 84296 32957
- Location: Burnley, Lancashire
- Country: England
- Denomination: Anglican

History
- Status: Parish church

Architecture
- Functional status: Active
- Heritage designation: Grade II*

Administration
- Province: York
- Diocese: Blackburn
- Archdeaconry: Blackburn
- Deanery: Burnley

St Peter's Church is an Anglican church in the town of Burnley, Lancashire, England. It is an active parish church in the Diocese of Blackburn and the archdeaconry of Blackburn. The oldest part of the church, the lower tower, dates from the 15th century, and there are several later additions and restorations. St Peter's is recorded in the National Heritage List for England as a designated Grade II* listed building. From 1901 to 1977, its rectors simultaneously occupied the suffragan bishopric of Burnley.

== History ==
St Peter's lies close to the banks of the River Brun. There was a church on the site prior to 1122; this was largely rebuilt in the 1530s by Thomas Sellars and Nicholas Craven. The lower part of the tower is the oldest part of the current building and dates from the 15th or 16th century. There have been enough additions and alterations to the tower that Hartwell & Pevsner (2009) state that "little genuine C16 work survives". A gallery was added to the west in 1735 to accommodate the growing population of Burnley. The south aisle was rebuilt in 1789, and the north aisle in 1802. An upper part was added to the tower in 1803. Interior restoration work took place in 1854 by Miles Thompson, who built nave arcades and clerestory. In 1872–1873, the chancel was enlarged.

== Present day and assessment ==
St Peter's was designated a Grade II* listed building on 10 November 1951. The Grade II* designation—the second highest of the three grades—is for "particularly important buildings of more than special interest". An active church in the Church of England, St Peter's is part of the diocese of Blackburn, which is in the Province of York. It is in the archdeaconry of Blackburn and the Deanery of Burnley.

== Architecture ==
=== Exterior ===
St Peter's is constructed of sandstone with slate roofs, and is in the late Perpendicular style. Its plan consists of a nave with a west tower, aisles to the north and south, and a chancel to the east. The tower is of four stages and has four-stage square, angled buttresses that reach halfway up the tower. The fourth stage of the tower is set back and has a crenellated parapet with pinnacles. There is a west doorway with a pointed arch and a hood mould.

=== Interior and fittings ===
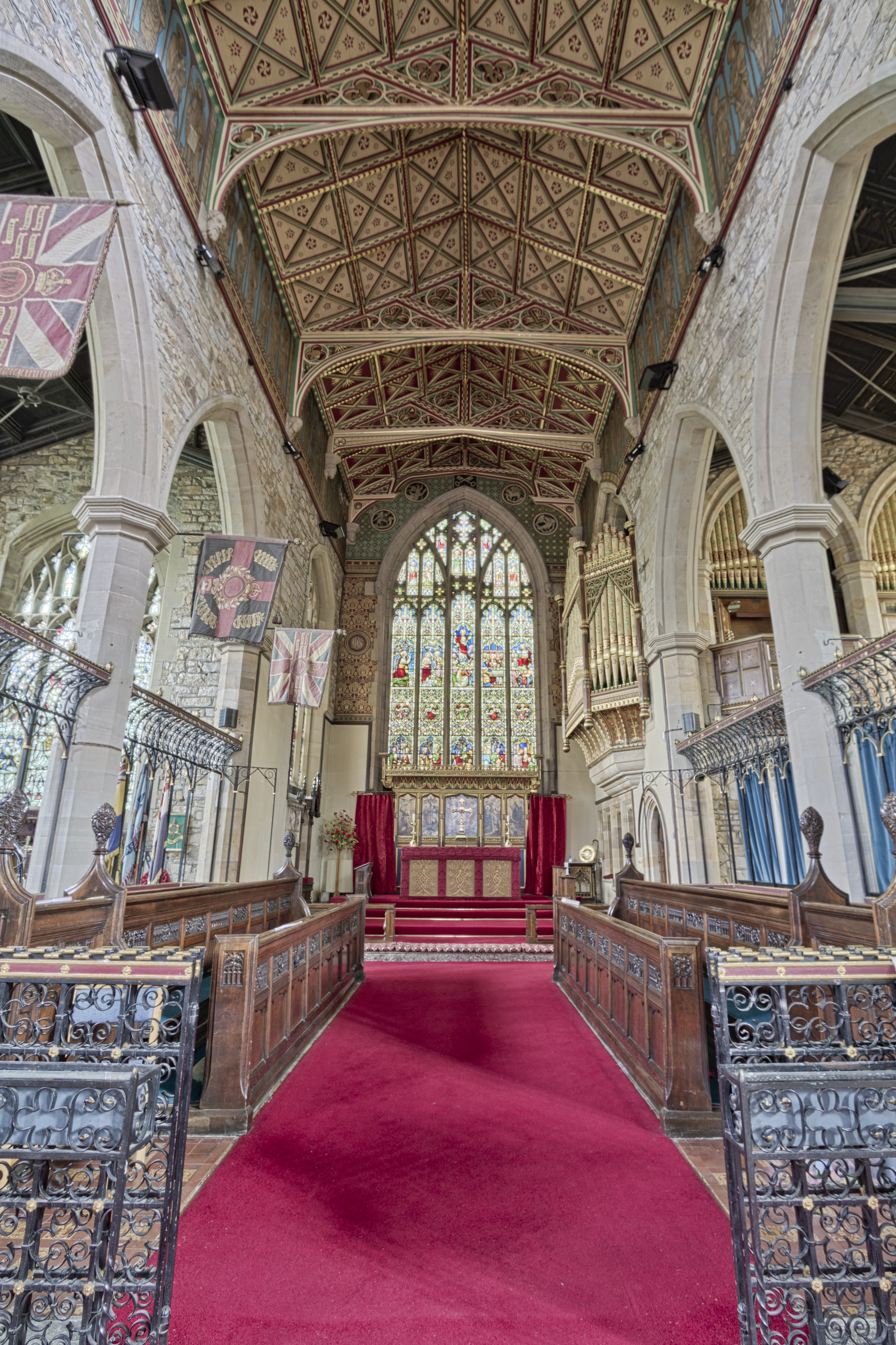
St Peter's Church interior

Internally, the tower is 13 feet (4.0 m) square. It has a vice (spiral staircase) in the south-east corner that is accessed through an external door. The nave measures 70 feet (21 m) by 20 feet 6 inches (6.25 m). It has a clerestory and arcades with arches over slender piers. There are two arches between the nave and the chancel.

== Churchyard ==
The churchyard contains what Hartwell & Pevsner describe as a "good crop" of monuments, including some chest tombs from the 19th century. South of the church there is a group of monuments including one dedicated to the Chaffer family, one dedicated to the Kay family and one dedicated to the Waddington family; all of these have been given a Grade II designation by English Heritage. The Chaffer monument, approximately 39 feet (12 m) from the church, is from the late 19th century. It is constructed of sandstone in the Gothic Revival style and has corner pinnacles. The Kay Monument is approximately 98 feet (30 m) from the church and probably dates from the mid-19th century. It is a chest tomb built of sandstone and solid granite. The Gothic-style Waddington monument, about 33 feet (10 m) from the church, is a free-standing spire of sandstone from the 19th century.

The scientist and astronomer Richard Towneley was buried at St Peter's Church in 1707.

The sandstone churchyard wall and gates date from about 1807. The wall is about 3 feet 3 inches (0.99 m) high and has gateways in the centre and south end. Additionally, there is a retaining wall on the north and west sides of the churchyard that also dates from about 1807, but includes some parts from 1736. This wall is built of coursed sandstone rubble. The churchyard walls, gates and retaining wall have all been given a Grade II listing by English Heritage.

=== Gallery ===
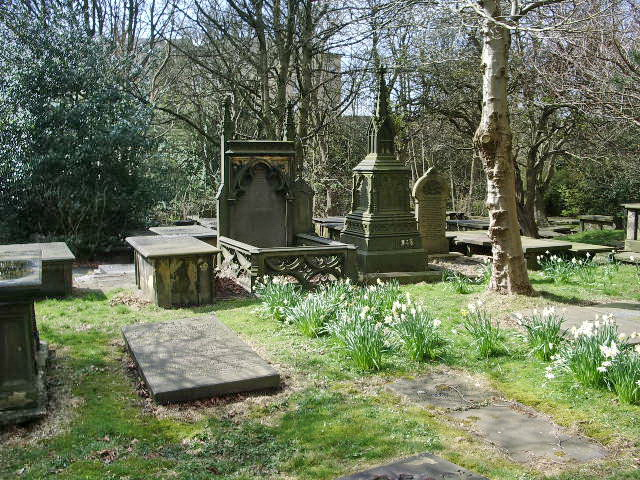
Tombs in the churchyard.

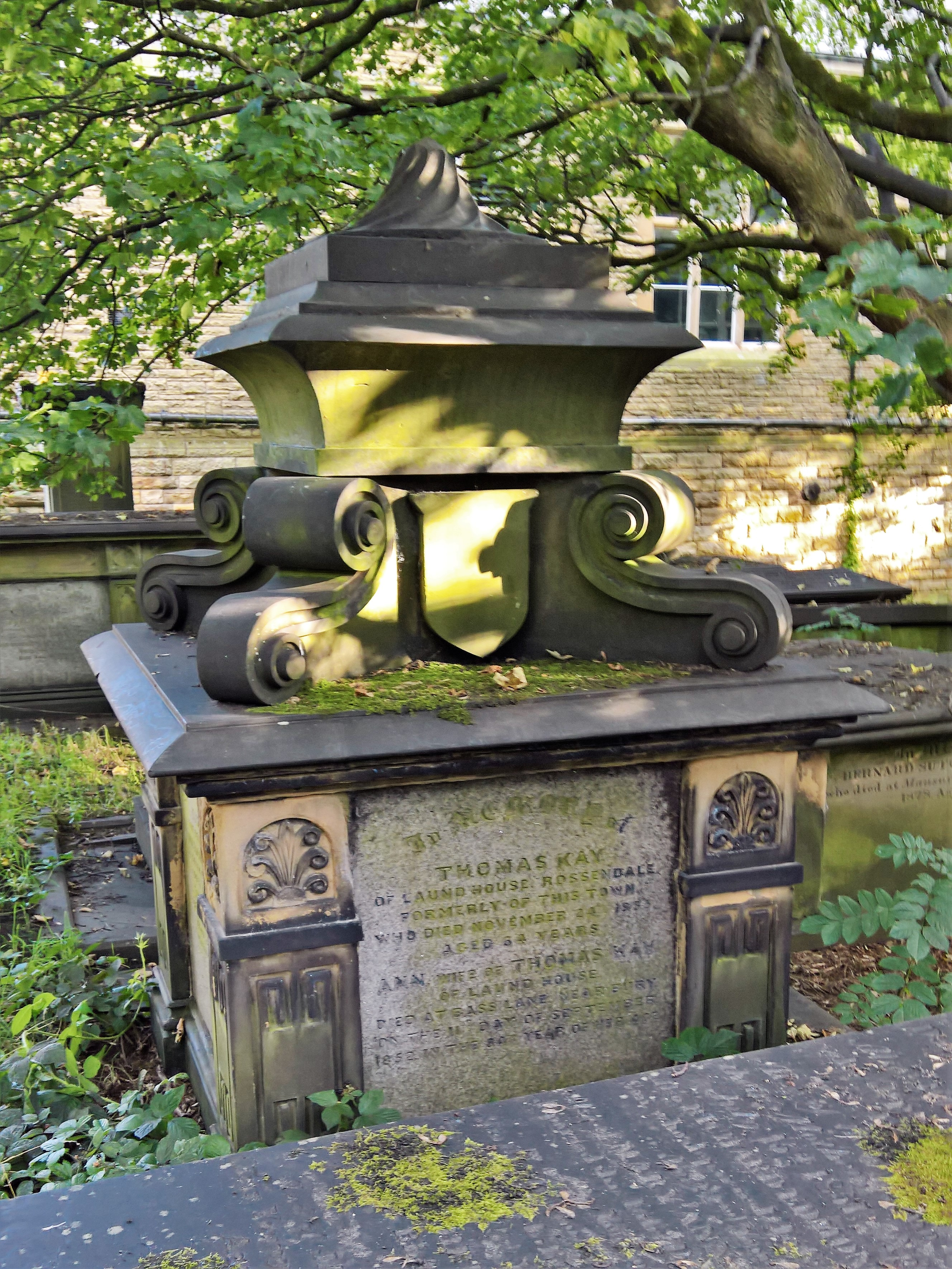
Kay Monument.

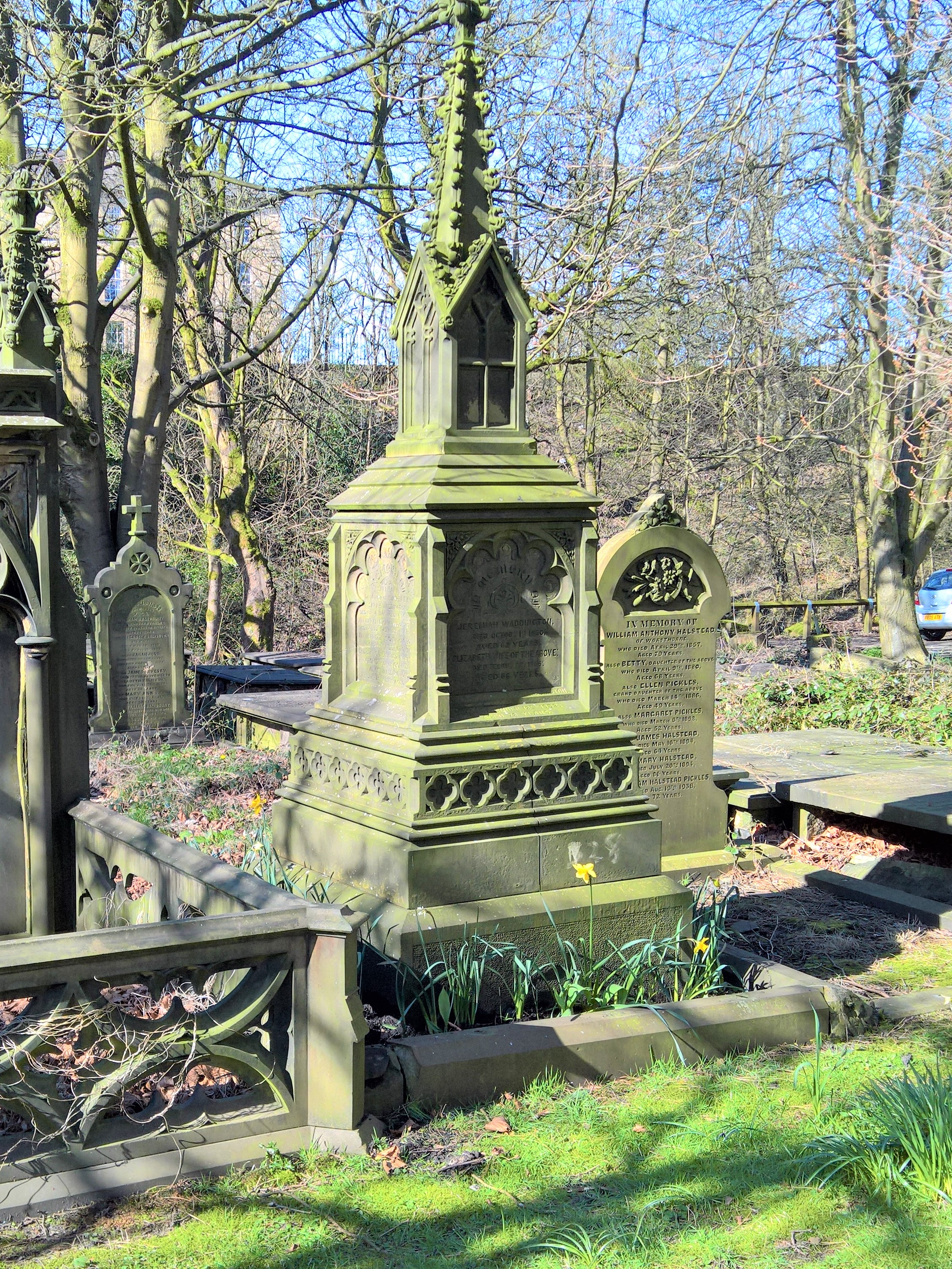
Waddington Monument.

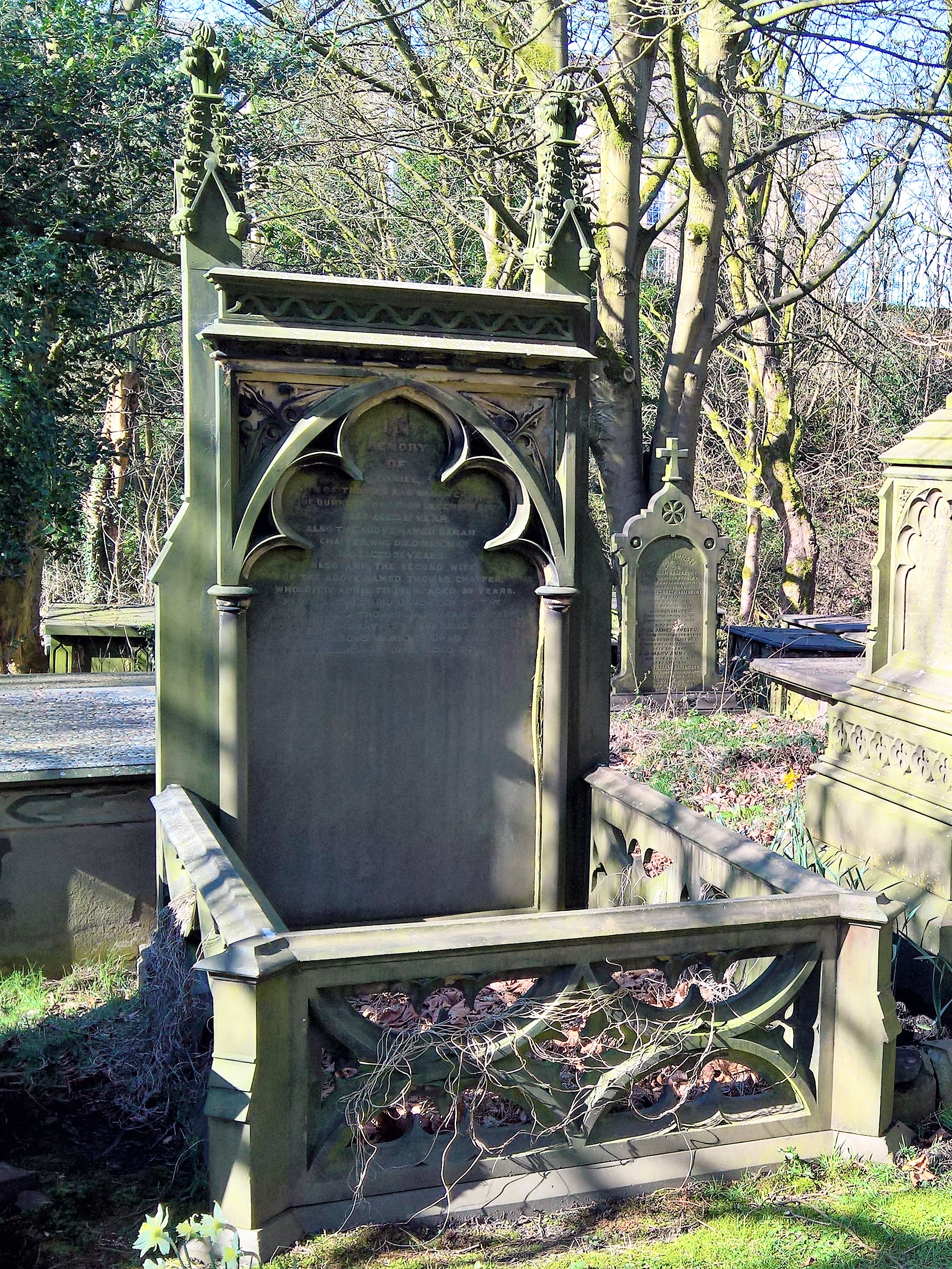
Chaffer Monument.

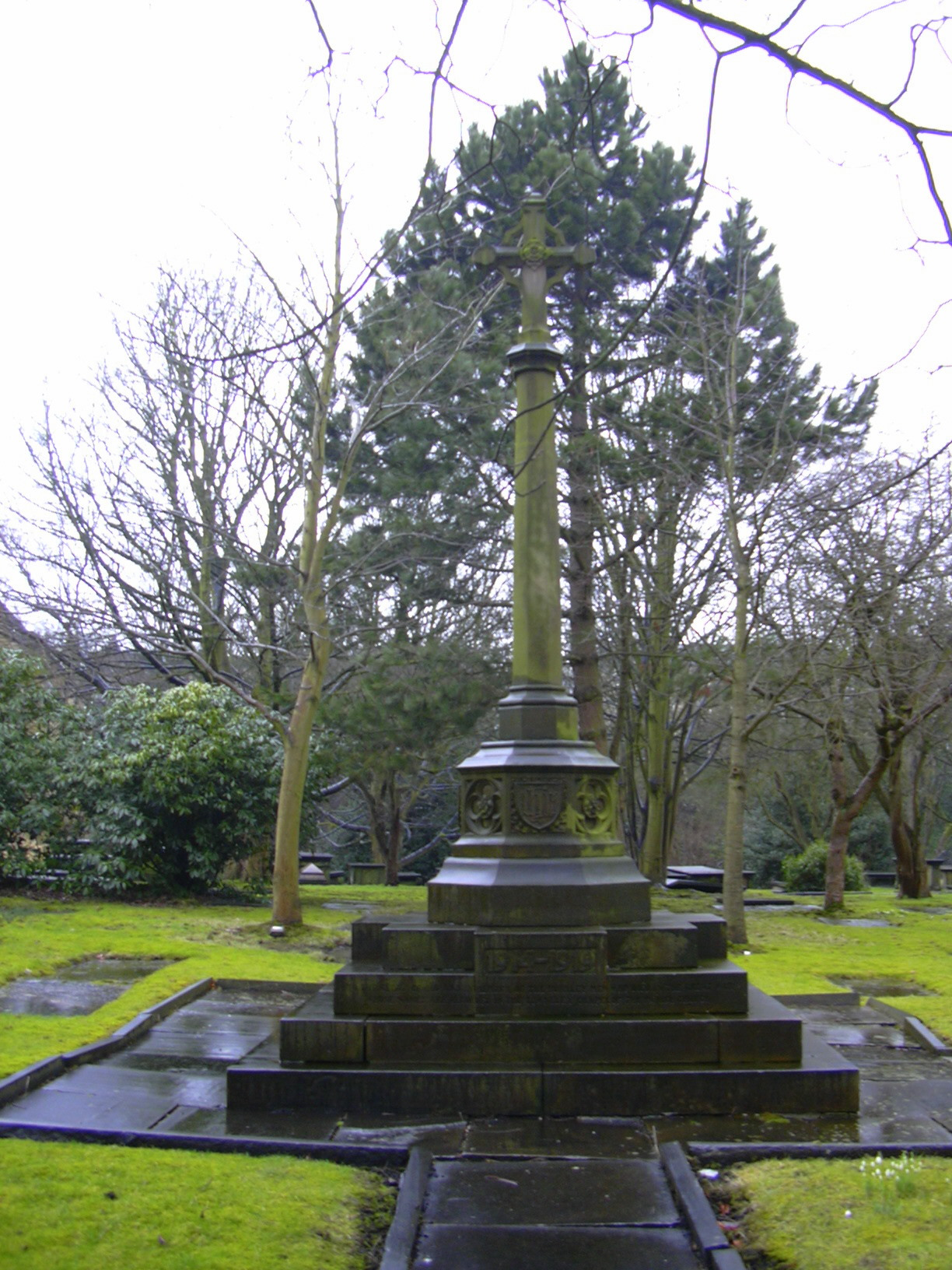
War Memorial

== See also ==
- Grade II* listed buildings in Lancashire
- Listed buildings in Burnley
- Places of worship in Burnley
