= Bank Hall Colliery =

Decommissioned coal mine in Lancashire

Coordinates: 53.798°N 2.235°W

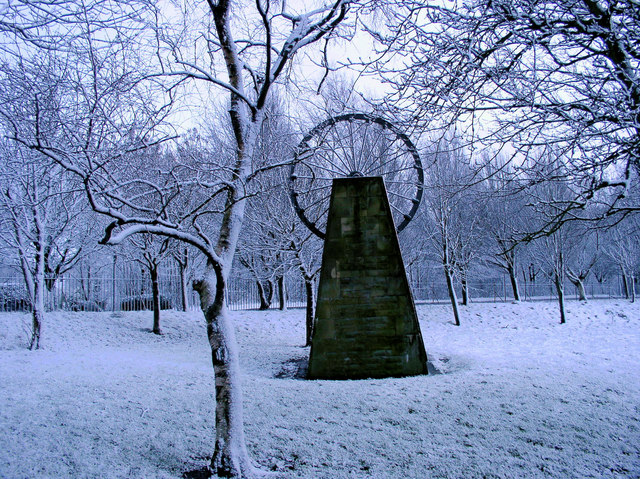
Monument in Bank Hall Park.

Bank Hall Colliery was a coal mine on the Burnley Coalfield in Burnley, Lancashire near the Leeds and Liverpool Canal. Sunk in the late 1860s, it was the town's largest and deepest pit and had a life of more than 100 years.

== History ==
The Rev. John Hargreaves (1732-1812), had purchased the Bank Hall estate—previously called Bank Top—by 1796. He entered the local coal industry through marriage in 1755 and in 1797 he acquired the lease-holds for most of the mineral rights in the area. After his death, the company adopted the name 'The Executors of John Hargreaves'. His nephew, Colonel John Hargreaves (1775-1834) continued the business until his death. His son had died young, and the property, including Bank Hall and Ormerod Hall in Cliviger, was divided between two daughters. The younger, Charlotte Anne, had married General Sir James Yorke Scarlett, a hero of the Battle of Balaclava, but the couple produced no offspring. The elder, Eleanor Mary, married the Rev. William Thursby and thus the company came under the control of the Thursby family. The Bank Hall estate covered a greater area than the later coal mine, with the hall itself located on the southwest side of the canal next to Colne Road. Its grounds on the River Brun, today make up part of Thompson Park. The estate also presumably covered the site of Queen's Park—southeast of the mine—which was donated to the Burnley Corporation by Sir John Hardy Thursby in 1888, for the purpose of creating the first public park in the town.

Bank Hall Colliery's first shafts were sunk to the Arley mine (Note: In this part of Lancashire a coal seam is referred to as a mine and the coal mine as a colliery or pit.) at a depth of 287 yards by Executors of John Hargreaves between 1865 and 1869. The four feet thick seam was worked until 1925. The King mine was worked between 1905 and 1925, and the Dandy (or Upper Arley) mine from 1910 to 1935. No. 3 shaft was sunk to the Dandy mine in 1903 and became known as the Dandy Pit. No.4 shaft was sunk to the Union mine, which had been formed by the merger of the Upper Foot and true Lower Mountain mines. Production from the Union mine started in 1915 and became the pit's the major source of coal. The fourth shaft at 1,500 feet was the deepest in the coalfield.

Worsley Mesnes Ironworks in Wigan built a twin horizontal winding engine with 26 inch cylinders for No. 1 shaft in 1912. Its 18 foot drum could wind up to 1,554 feet. Yates & Thom of Blackburn built No. 4 shaft's cross compound horizontal engine in 1914. It had 38 inch and 60 inch cylinders, a 19 feet drum and could wind to 1,464 feet. Walker Brothers of Wigan supplied a steam fan engine with a 5 feet diameter fly wheel.

The colliery was taken over by the National Coal Board (NCB) on 1 January 1947 and significant investments were made. Haulage roads were made for battery locomotives, which pulled five-ton mine cars and the pit botton at No.4 Shaft was modernised.

The Union mine proved to be gassy and ignitions of firedamp were caused by sparks made when mechanised cutter picks hit coal balls containing nodules of iron pyrites. The problems led to the NCB stopping the last coal face working in January 1971 and closed the pit on 17 April. Salvage work was completed and the site cleared in 1972.

== See also ==
- Hapton Valley Colliery
- Collieries in the Burnley area since 1854
- Glossary of coal mining terminology
