= Queens Park, Burnley =

Park in Burnley, United Kingdom

Queens Park
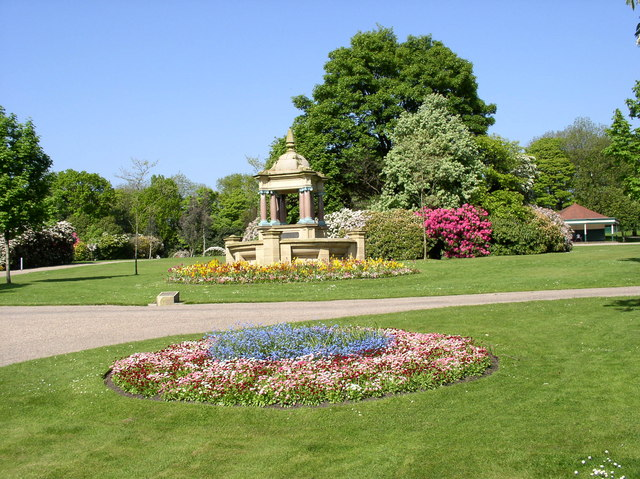
- Queens Park
- Interactive map of Queens Park
- Type: Public
- Location: Burnley, Lancashire
- Coordinates: 53°47′45″N 2°13′48″W
- Area: 11.2 hectares (28 acres)
- Created: 1893
- Operator: Burnley Borough Council
- Status: Grade II English Heritage
- Awards: Green Flag

Queens Park is a public park in Burnley, Lancashire. It covers 11.2 hectares and was opened in 1893, making it Burnley's oldest park.

Located approximately one km northeast of the town centre, attractions include a skate park, tennis courts, a children's play area, a bandstand, football pitches, putting greens, a cycle track and a cafe.

In the second half of the nineteenth century Burnley's population increased almost five-fold and there was a pressing need for public open space so from 1872, the council opted to provide recreation grounds, with several opened around the town in the following years which proved to be popular. In 1881, John Hargreaves Scott, a former mayor of Burnley, died leaving £10,000 to be used upon his wife's death to create a public park for the town. Although Mrs Scott died in 1884, the trustees took some time to decide where to use the money, meaning that Scott Park would not be the town's first.

In 1888, a local colliery owner, Sir John Hardy Thursby, donated the land, valued at £27,000 (equivalent to about £3 million in 2018), for the purpose of creating a public park in the town and the Burnley Corporation used its own money to lay-out the grounds. His company's Bank Hall Colliery was located to the north, and in the early years a tram road crossed the park to transport coal from Bee Hole and Rowley Collieries.

The approximately triangular site is bounded by Queen Victoria Road to the northwest, Queen's Park Road to the northeast and Ormerod Road on the south. The original entrances are located at the corners. Those on Queen Victoria Road consist of a carriage entrance flanked by pedestrian entrances set between stone gate piers, all three gateways supporting ornamental iron gates. The central pair bear the coat of arms of the Borough of Burnley. The simple metal gates at the southeast corner were installed later, after coal mining had ceased under that area. An ornate drinking fountain was built to commemorate the gift. It consists of a circular sandstone bowl lined with rendered brick carried on octagonal piers with ball finials. It is surrounded by a canopy with four pairs of polished granite Ionic order columns on a stone plinth. On top of the canopy is a dome with an obelisk finial, and on the plinth are inscribed bronze panels.

The extension northwards of Belvedere Road in the early 20th century separated the southwest tip of the park, containing a two-storey stone-built lodge, from the remainder.

Queens Park is listed as a Grade II public park by English Heritage and has also been awarded the Green Flag Award for its high standards.

== See also ==
- Listed buildings in Burnley
