= Church of St Mary of the Assumption, Burnley =

Coordinates: 53.7888°N 2.2352°W

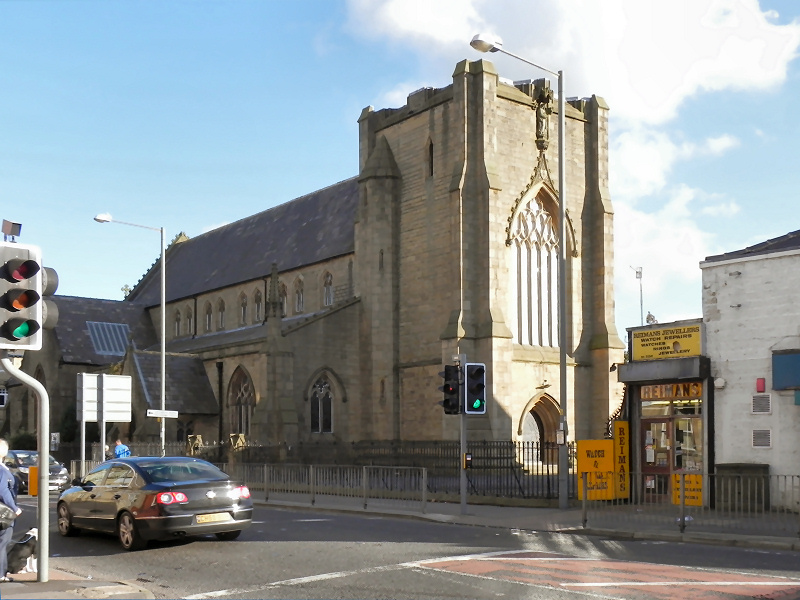
- Church from the northwest

- Location in Burnley
- OS grid reference: SD 846 325
- Location: Yorkshire Street, Burnley, Lancashire
- Country: England
- Denomination: Roman Catholic
- Website: Parish of the Good Samaritan, Burnley

History
- Status: Parish church

Architecture
- Functional status: Active
- Heritage designation: Grade II
- Designated: 29 September 1977
- Architect(s): Weightman and Hadfield
- Architectural type: Church
- Style: Gothic Revival (Decorated)
- Groundbreaking: 1846
- Completed: 1879

Specifications
- Materials: Sandstone, slate roof

Administration
- Diocese: Salford

Clergy
- Priest: Fr David Featherstone

The Church of St Mary of the Assumption is in Yorkshire Street, Burnley, Lancashire, England. It is an active Roman Catholic parish church in the diocese of Salford. The church is recorded in the National Heritage List for England as a designated Grade II listed building. It was built between 1846 and 1849 to replace a smaller chapel on a different site. The church was designed by Weightman and Hadfield in Decorated style, and a chapel was added to it in 1879.

== History ==
Until the 19th century the Roman Catholics in the Burnley area worshipped in a chapel in Towneley Hall. St Mary's parish was founded in 1819 when a chapel known as Burnley Wood Chapel, or St Mary's Chapel, was built by Peregrine Towneley on Todmorden Road, near the entrance lodge to Towneley Park. The present church was built between 1846 and 1849, and was designed by Weightman and Hadfield. The land was donated by Towneley, with the stone coming from a quarry on his land near Todmorden. It was opened in August 1849, the sermon being preached by Cardinal Wiseman. In 1879 a north chapel was added to the church. Known as the Towneley Chapel, it is a memorial to Colonel John Towneley and his son Richard, the last of the male line of the Towneley family at Towneley Hall. It was dedicated to Our Lady of the Angels, which seems to relate to John’s daughter Mary, who had taken the name ‘Sister Marie des Saints Anges’ when she became a nun.

== Architecture ==
=== Exterior ===
The church is constructed in sandstone with slate roofs, and is in Decorated style. Its plan consists of a five-bay nave with a clerestory, north and south aisles, north and south transepts, a chancel with a north and south chapels, and a west tower. The tower is uncompleted, and has two stages. It stands on a moulded plinth with angle buttresses and a northeast canted stair turret. There is a west doorway, above which is a large five-light window. At the top of the window is a canopied niche containing a statue. In the clerestory are two-light windows, and along the sides of the aisles are buttresses and three-light windows. In the second bay of each aisle is a gabled porch. The transepts are also buttressed, and they contain windows with varied tracery; the south transept also has a circular window. The east window in the chancel has five lights, above which is a tripartite niche with a crocketed surround, containing a statue of the Virgin Mary.

=== Interior ===
Inside the church, the aisle arcades are carried on alternate round and octagonal piers. The richly carved altar dating from the 1860s is by E. W. Pugin. The Towneley Chapel contains dark panelling and painting on a gold surround, and has ironwork gates. In the nave is a scheme of stained glass windows from the late 19th century by Mayer of Munich. The two-manual pipe organ was built by Gray and Davidson in 1855, and has been awarded a Historic Organ Certificate.

== Associated structures ==
Attached to the north and south sides of the church are cast iron railings, divided by standards with fleur-de-lis heads. On the north side is a gateway with stone piers in Gothic style between which are elaborate cast iron gates. To the east of the church are a Franciscan convent containing a chapel, and a presbytery.

== Appraisal ==
St Mary's Church was designated as a Grade II listed building on 29 September 1977. Grade II is the lowest of the three grades of listing and is applied to buildings that are "nationally important and of special interest". The railings and gate piers are included in this listing. The Franciscan convent and the presbytery were also designed as Grade II listed buildings on the same date.

== See also ==
- Listed buildings in Burnley
- Places of worship in Burnley
