= Robert Whitworth (canal engineer) =

English land surveyor and engineer

- Born: 1734; Sowerby, England
- Died: 30 March 1799 (aged 64–65); Halifax, West Riding of Yorkshire
- Children: Robert and William Whitworth
- Engineering career
- Discipline: Civil
- Projects: Calder and Hebble Navigation, Leeds and Liverpool Canal

Robert Whitworth (1734 – 30 March 1799) was an English land surveyor and engineer, who learnt his trade under John Smeaton and James Brindley, and went on to become one of the leading canal engineers of his generation.

== Biography ==
Whitworth was born in Sowerby, West Riding of Yorkshire to Henry and Mary Whitworth. He was baptised on 15 November 1734, and was their sixth child of seven. His father worked as a combsmith, and the family lived in a house called Waterside or Wheatleyroyd, where he probably lived until he married Sarah Irwin on 26 December 1765. After a brief period in Norton in the Moors around 1772, Whitworth and his family, which by now included two sons, returned to Sowerby, and stayed there until the 1790s. During the latter part of this period he lived in Waterside, but moved to Burnley for the final years of his life, to be closer to the Leeds and Liverpool Canal, on which he was working. He died on 30 March 1799 at the White Lion Inn in Halifax, aged 64.

=== Early career ===
Details of Whitworth's early life have not been found, but in 1761 he produced plans of an estate in Erringden, by which time he was a qualified land surveyor. He undertook a variety of tasks, which included measuring the stonework of Sowerby Church, so that the contractors who had built it could be paid the correct amount, and conducting a survey of the religious affiliations of families in Sowerby. Although its purpose is unknown, he surveyed part of the River Calder and produced a plan. The engineer John Smeaton had been working on the Calder and Hebble Navigation since 1759, working upstream from Wakefield. There is no direct evidence to connect the two men, but it seems likely that Whitworth would have taken an interest in such a significant project, and that he learnt a great deal from watching Smeaton's methods.

Smeaton was replaced by James Brindley as the engineer for the Calder and Hebble project in 1765, and again there is no direct evidence to link the two men at this stage, but plans for the Huddersfield Broad Canal, produced for Sir John Ramsden in 1766, are variously attributed either to Brindley or to Whitworth, and by 1767, Whitworth had become the chief surveyor and draughtsman within Brindley's organisation. There are a number of cases where Brindley was able to obtain commissions for survey work because of his reputation, but the work was then delegated to Whitworth to carry out. During this period he produced plans for the Staffordshire and Worcestershire Canal's Birmingham to Aldersley Junction route, the canal from Coventry to Fradley Heath on the Trent and Mersey Canal, the Droitwich Barge Canal and the Oxford Canal. He also attended Parliament to assist Brindley during the 1767–68 session.

His next projects were farther afield, as he went to Ireland to assess proposals for the Lagan Canal, and then to County Durham to produce plans and reports for a proposed canal to link Winston to Stockton-on-Tees. Nearly a year later, he collaborated with Brindley on the production of an estimate for the cost of the scheme. He assessed John Longbotham's plans for the Leeds and Liverpool Canal, and a year later reviewed plans for a more southern route for that canal, which was rejected when he pointed out flaws in the levels used for the route. After advising on a scheme for a canal from Leeds to Selby, he spent three months in Devon, surveying possible routes for a ship canal to link Exeter to the Bristol Channel. Next he made a survey for the Andover Canal in 1770, and then joined Brindley in London, to advise on improvements to the River Thames. The joint report, suggesting that the river channel be bypassed from Isleworth in West London to Monkey Island near Bray, Berkshire, was supported by a 7-foot (2.1 m) long plan, drawn by Whitworth. He then surveyed a second bypass, from Monkey Island to Reading, and gave evidence in Parliament to support a bill for its construction, which was eventually defeated.

Recognition by his peers occurred in 1771, when they voted to admit him to the newly formed Society of Civil Engineers, later renamed the Smeatonian Society of Civil Engineers after its founder, John Smeaton. Wider public recognition occurred when the editor of the Gentleman's Magazine approached him for information and plans to support a series of articles about proposed canals and those being constructed. He assisted in this way between 1771 and 1774. He continued to produce plans and reports, which covered the River Trent at Newark in collaboration with John Grundy, Jr., the Lancaster Canal to Kendal in the Lake District, and the Chelmer and Blackwater Navigation in Essex. A plan to bypass the lower Lee Navigation by the construction of a canal from Waltham Abbey to Moorfields, close to the City of London, with a branch to Marylebone, provided an opportunity for him to show how his canals could be integrated into a wider urban landscape.

=== Canal engineering ===
In 1774, Whitworth and Thomas Yeoman were asked to report on improvements to the River Thames between London and Staines. The report was produced in June 1774, after which Whitworth became Surveyor to the Navigation Committee, a post which he held until 1784. Initially, he received £250 per year, although this was reduced to £100 in 1780, as the amount of work required of him reduced. Through much of this period, he continued to act as a consultant, assessing plans and producing reports. In 1777, he reported on the Herefordshire and Gloucestershire Canal, and between 1779 and 1780, on a possible route to extend the Stort Navigation from Bishop's Stortford to Cambridge. Also in 1779, he reported on the completion of the Oxford Canal between Oxford and Banbury. In 1782 there were rival schemes for a link between the River Severn and the River Thames. Following a review of them, he found in favour of the extension of the Stroudwater Navigation to Lechlade, on the basis that it was more fully planned than the alternative to Tewkesbury. He gave evidence in Parliament in support of the bill for what became the Thames and Severn Canal, and although he did not act as engineer for the project, he probably recommended Josiah Clowes for the post, and later assisted him with the most difficult part of the engineering, which was the setting out and production of profiles for Sapperton Tunnel.

He went on to act as Chief Engineer for the extension of the Forth and Clyde Canal between 1785 and 1791, and as Engineer for the Leeds and Liverpool Canal Gargrave to Accrington section between 1790 and 1799. Again, his duties were reduced from 1795, as was his salary, and he was involved with a number of other canal schemes, including the Ashby Canal, the Wilts and Berks Canal, the Dearne and Dove Canal, and the Herefordshire and Gloucestershire Canal. His sons Robert and William both worked on canal projects, and were assisted by their father.

== Bibliography ==
- Skempton, Sir Alec; et al. (2002). A Biographical Dictionary of Civil Engineers in Great Britain and Ireland: Vol 1: 1500 to 1830. Thomas Telford. ISBN 0-7277-2939-X.
