= River Brun =

River in eastern Lancashire, England

Coordinates: 53.7914°N 2.2475°W

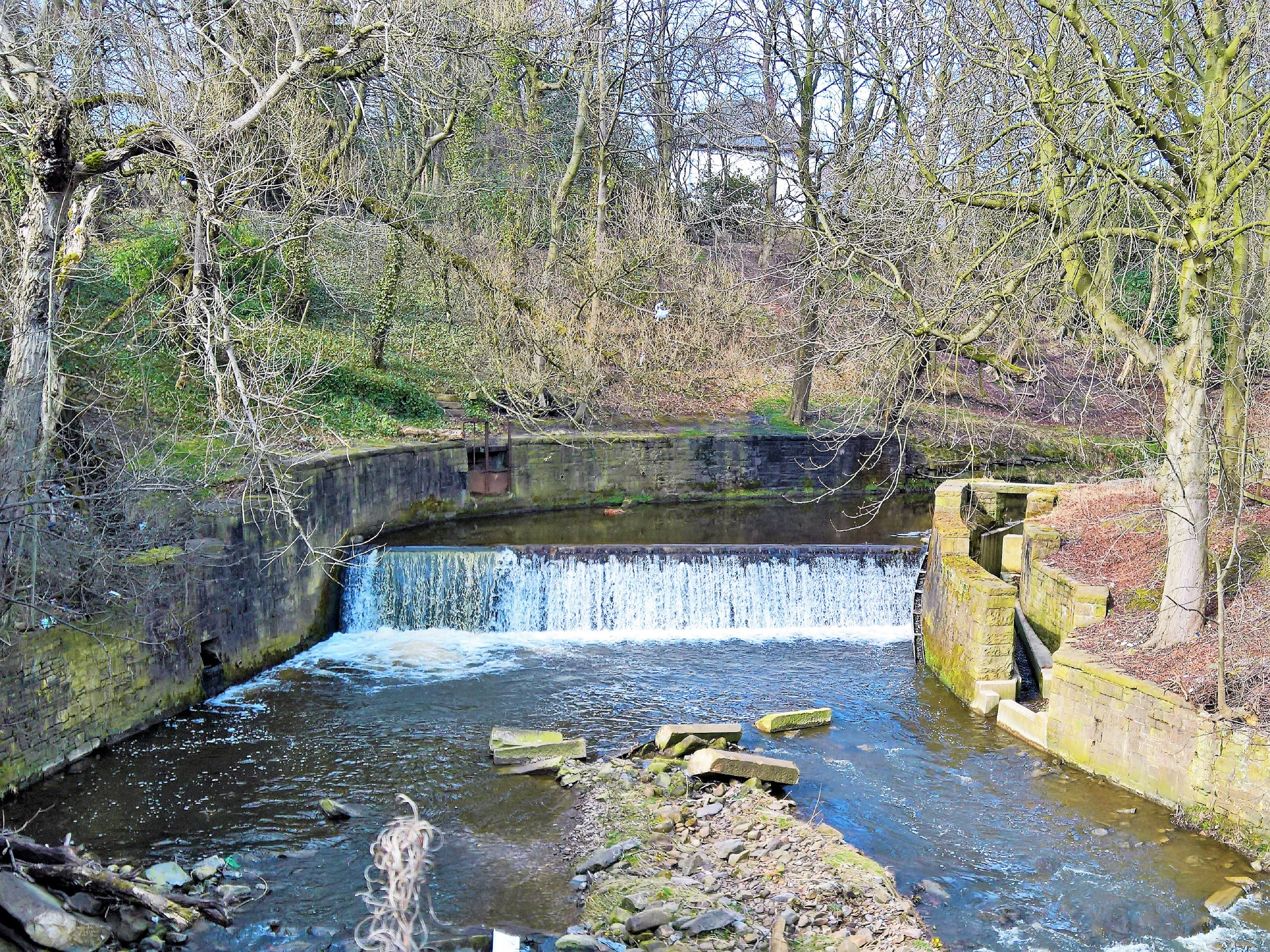
- The Brun as it falls over the old weir in Burnley

Location
- Country: England

Physical characteristics
- Source
  - location: Hurstwood, Worsthorne, Lancashire
- Mouth
  - location: River Calder, Burnley
- Length: 4.5 mi (7.2 km)

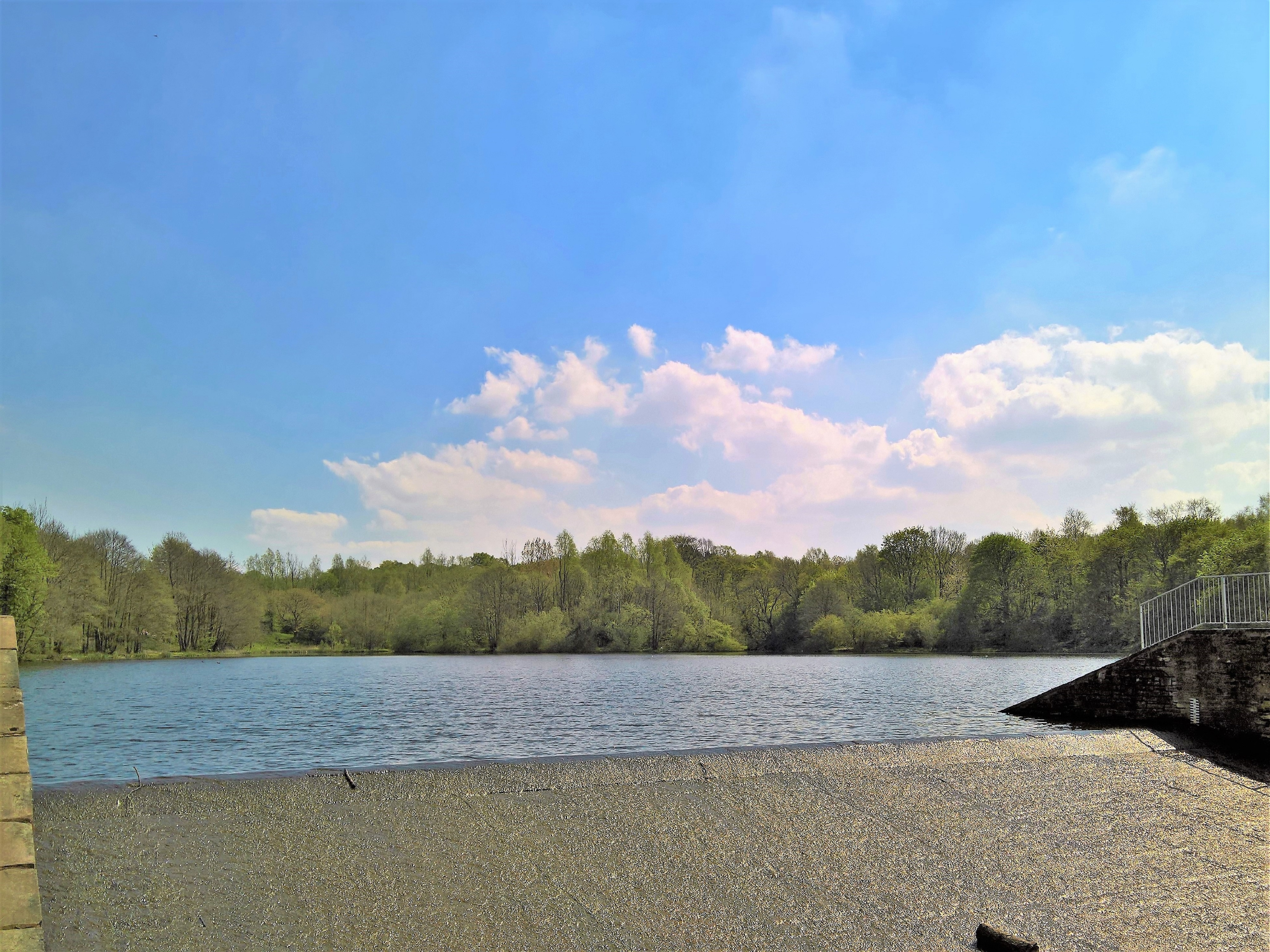
The dam and weir at Rowley Lake.

The River Brun is a river in eastern Lancashire. It is approximately 4.5 miles (7.2 km) long and has a catchment area (not including the River Don) of 9.32 square miles (24.134 km^{2}). (Note: Measured using mapping website.)

== Course ==
Thought to begin at the confluence of Hurstwood Brook (draining Wether Edge, Hameldon and supplying the Hurstwood Reservoir) and Rock Water at Foxstones Bridge near the village of Hurstwood, the river runs northwest towards the town of Burnley. Rock Water only begins a short distance to the southeast, where Cant Clough Beck (from that reservoir) meets Shedden Clough stream.

Heading northwest, the river passes Ormerod and is met by the small stream that flows through Worsthorne. It continues past the Hollins, the hamlet of Brownside and through the Rowley Lake near Rowley Hall before collecting Swinden Water and then the River Don at Netherwood Bridge and turning west. Entering Burnley at Heasandford, the Brun collects Walshaw Clough stream as it passes Burnley Youth Theatre. Turning southwest and travelling on through Bank Hall Park and under the Leeds and Liverpool Canal into Thompson Park (where it supplies the boating lake) and on past St Peter's Church. As it moves through the town centre it is briefly culverted at the St Peter's Centre and again as it passes under the Charter Walk shopping centre. Having turning back toward the west, the Brun falls over one final weir as it joins the River Calder close to the roundabout on Active Way.

== History ==
The river is generally thought to have given its name to Burnley (from the Old English brūn lēah), with the name thought to mean the meadow or clearing by the brown river. However it is impossible to be certain that the town is not named after the brown meadow and river renamed after the settlement achieved some significance.

West of Hurstwood the Brun flows under Salterford Bridge, the site of a ford on an ancient saltway. At the end of the Don are the remains of sluices and dams that supply water to the mill lodge for the old Heasandford Mill, historically located further downstream near the old manor house (thought to be anciently the pheasant ford). Close to St. Peter's the remains of a weir can still be seen, the water went through a goit (part of which has been preserved) to a lodge for the town's old corn mill located next to the Bridge Inn. The mill is thought to have been originally erected around 1290 and was still water-powered until 1820. The ancient bridge near the church was demolished in June 1736 and a new one 4 yards wide, with a 16-yard arch was erected nearby. The last crossing before the confluence with the Calder is called Salford, (Note: The Salford is thought to mean the willow ford.) the area of the town that developed around it was also known by that name in the early 20th century.

The lake at Rowley and the Brun's course onward to Heasandford is an artificial creation of the 1970s. Previously this section of the river flowed further to the west, with the Don collecting Swinden Water before meeting the Brun close to the mill lodge. Bank Hall was formerly the site of a significant coal mine that operated for over 100 years up to 1971, with another near Rowley Hall that operated between 1861 and 1928, and the area was used as a spoil tip for generations. The mine workings caused significant levels of pollution in the river and the diversion scheme also allowed the valley of the old route to be used as a landfill site.

Restoration works led by Lancashire County Council for over 40-years, has seen the Bank Hall site turned into a park and also the ongoing creation of the Brun Valley Forest Park along the river between Brownside and Heasandford. This was helped by the 2011-15 Urban River Enhancement Scheme (URES) which made improvements the river habitat in the town, including constructing fish passes on the weirs.

Next confluence upstream	River Calder	Next confluence downstream
-	River Brun	Pendle Water (North)
