= Burnley Way =

Long-distance footpath in Lancashire, England

Coordinates: 53.7861°N 2.2465°W

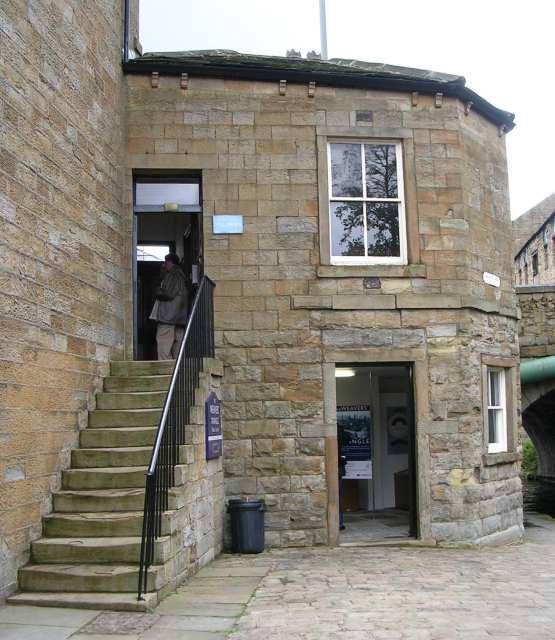
- Weavers' Triangle Visitor Center, usual start/end of route
- Length: 40 mi (64 km)
- Location: Lancashire, England
- Trailheads: Circular based on Burnley
- Use: Hiking

The Burnley Way is a 40-mile (64 km) long distance footpath in Lancashire, England. As a circular walk it can be walked from any point, but it is common to start and finish at the Weavers' Triangle Visitor Centre in Burnley. It covers a range of terrain from canal towpaths to open moorland.

The path is waymarked by a letter "B" and a bird symbol. It was created in 1993 and updated in May 2008.

== Route ==
The route is described in a series of six sectional leaflets, updated in 2008, which are available from Burnley Tourist Information Centre. The first section begins at the Manchester Road canal bridge (where the Weavers' Triangle Visitor Centre is located), and follows the towpath of the Leeds and Liverpool Canal over the Burnley Embankment to Thompson Park. It then follows the River Brun through Bank Hall Park and past Heasandford House where it joins the route of the Brontë Way out of Burnley, almost to Lea Green Reservoir. It then passes the ruined Extwistle Hall and over the River Don to Queen Street Mill Textile Museum in Harle Syke. The second section crosses Todmorden Road, passing a number of farms and over Thursden brook. It then follows the road up the Thursden valley and crosses into West Yorkshire, descending to Widdop Reservoir. Joining the Mary Towneley Loop section of the Pennine Bridleway at the Gorple track, it moves back into Lancashire and past Hurstwood Reservoir to the Elizabethan hamlet of Hurstwood.

The third section rejoins the Mary Towneley Loop, going through some of the new woodland created by the Forest of Burnley project and crosses Sheddon Clough into Cliviger (There was a limestone hushing operation here in the 17th century). It then joins an ancient road called The Long Causeway, and passes Coal Clough Wind Farm before descending into the Cliviger Gorge toward the village of Portsmouth, West Yorkshire. Section four ascends the opposite side of the gorge to Heald Moor, and onto the highest point of the route at Thieveley Pike (449 metres (1,473.1 ft)). Here part of the path follows a Medieval saltway route that ran from Cheshire via Manchester to Knaresborough and Wetherby. And next to the triangulation station are the remains of what is thought to be an ancient beacon, possibly reusing the site of upland round barrow. The path then steeply descends back into the valley toward Holme Chapel before reconnecting with the Mary Towneley Loop over Easden Clough. At this point walkers are offered a choice between two paths: one passes Dyneley Hall, the home of Lady Mary Towneley (late wife of Sir Simon) in whose honour the local section of the Pennine Bridleway is named, while the other passes a wooded hillock called the Fireman's Helmet. At Walk Mill the route continues on to Barcroft Hall and then to the Towneley Hall museum and park.

Section five again climbs the hillside into Habergham Eaves where a choice is offered of crossing or bypassing the golf course at Burnley Golf Club. After crossing Crown Point Road the route descends into Dunnockshaw and Clowbridge Reservoir before summiting Hameldon Hill. As well as the old rifle range on the common at Higher Barley Green, the descent into Hapton passes the Hameldon Hill Wind Farm. This is also the site of Hapton Tower around which, in the late 15th century, Sir John Towneley was given licence to create a deer park of 1,000 Lancashire arces. From Mill Hill Lane it shares the route of the Hyndburn Clog and Huncoat Trail through Castle Clough Wood before crossing the Railway, M65 motorway and the canal near Shuttleworth Hall. The sixth section descends to the River Calder, and enters Padiham through Memorial Park. At Padiham Town Hall it follows the Calder out of the town on the Grove Lane Greenway, with views of Gawthorpe Hall and Burnley FC's training ground. To cross the Calder, the route again joins the Brontë Way and at this point connects to the Pendle Way for the Forest of Pendle and Pendle Hill. Passing through Ightenhill, the route again joins the canal towpath to pass over the M65 aqueduct and return to the old cotton mills of the Weavers' triangle.

== Media gallery ==
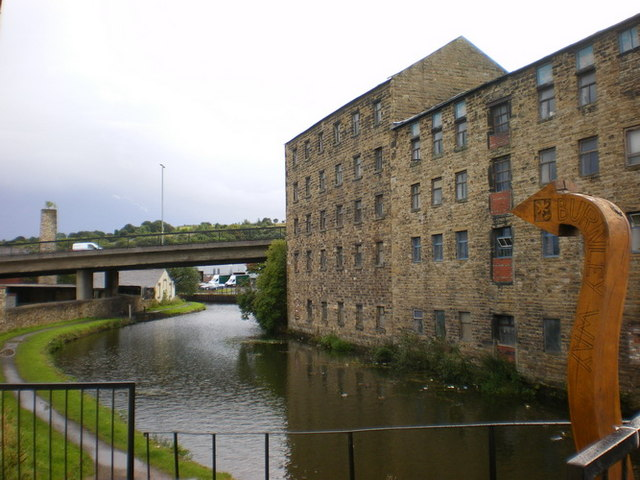
Towpath of the Leeds and Liverpool Canal in the Weavers' Triangle

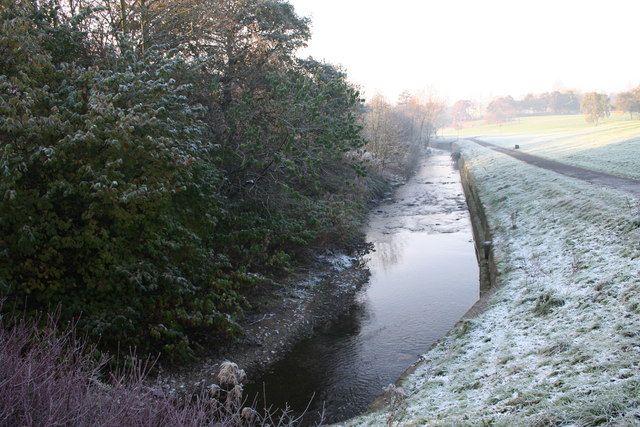
Following the River Brun through Bank Hall Park

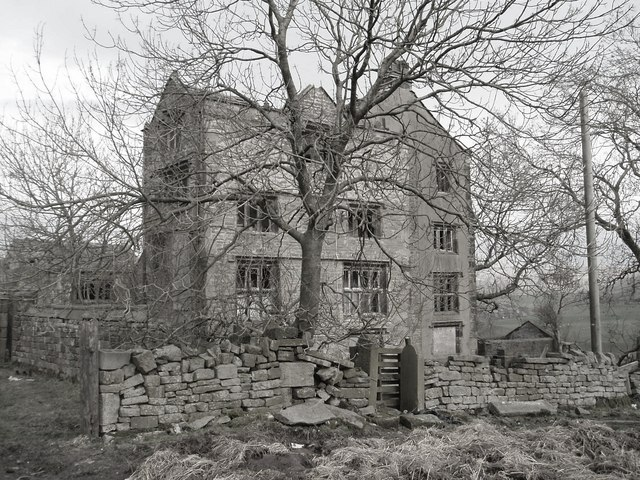
Extwistle Hall, Briercliffe

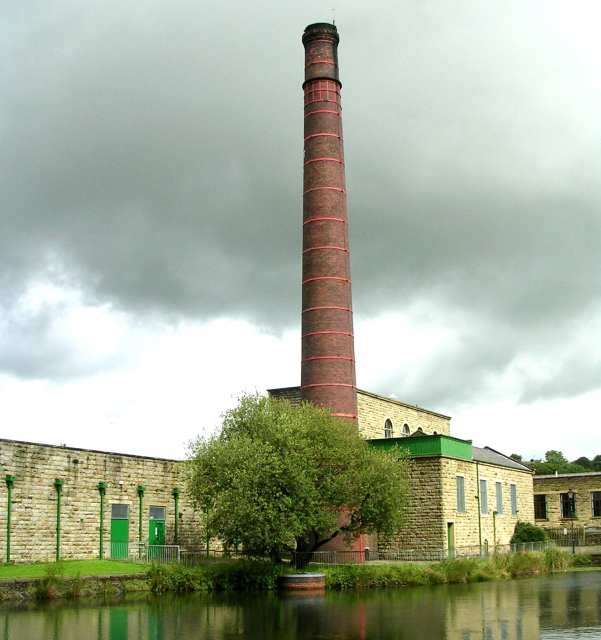
Queen Street Mill Textile Museum, Harle Syke

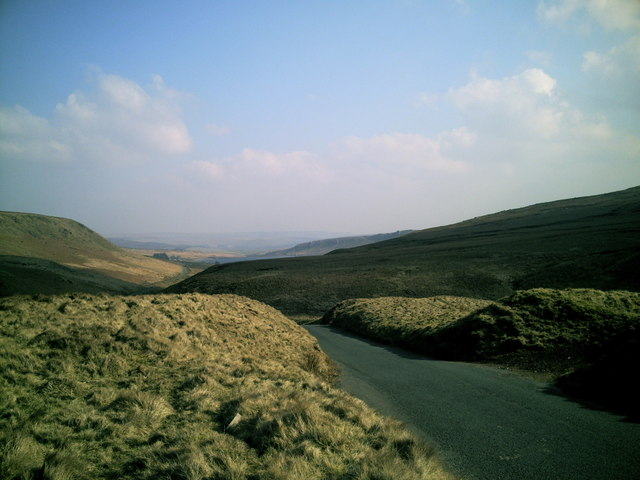
Heading into West Yorkshire at Widdop Reservoir

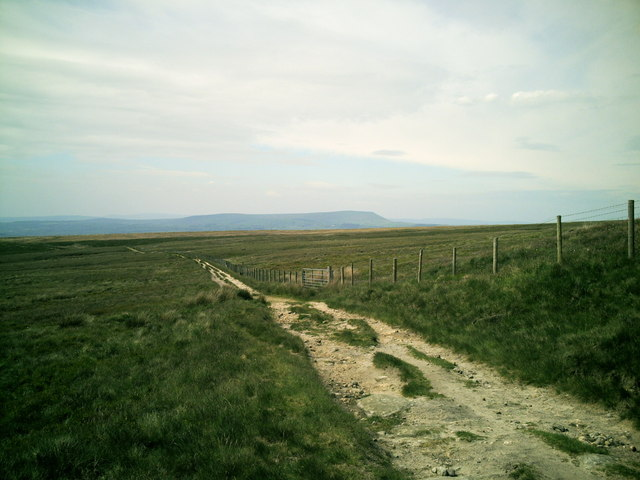
Gorple Road crossing back into Lancashire

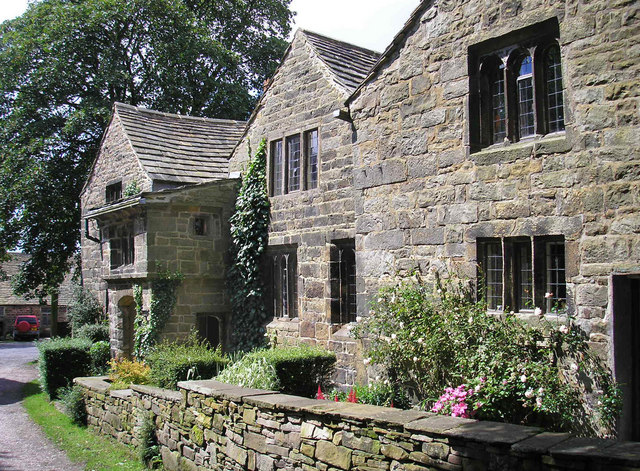
Spenser's House, Hurstwood

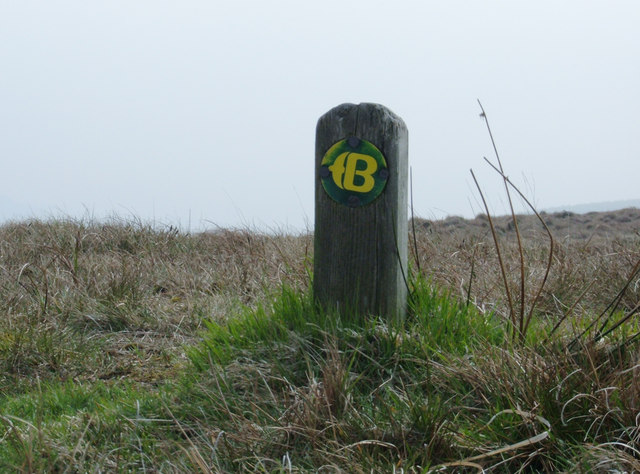
Waymarker on Heald Moor, Cliviger

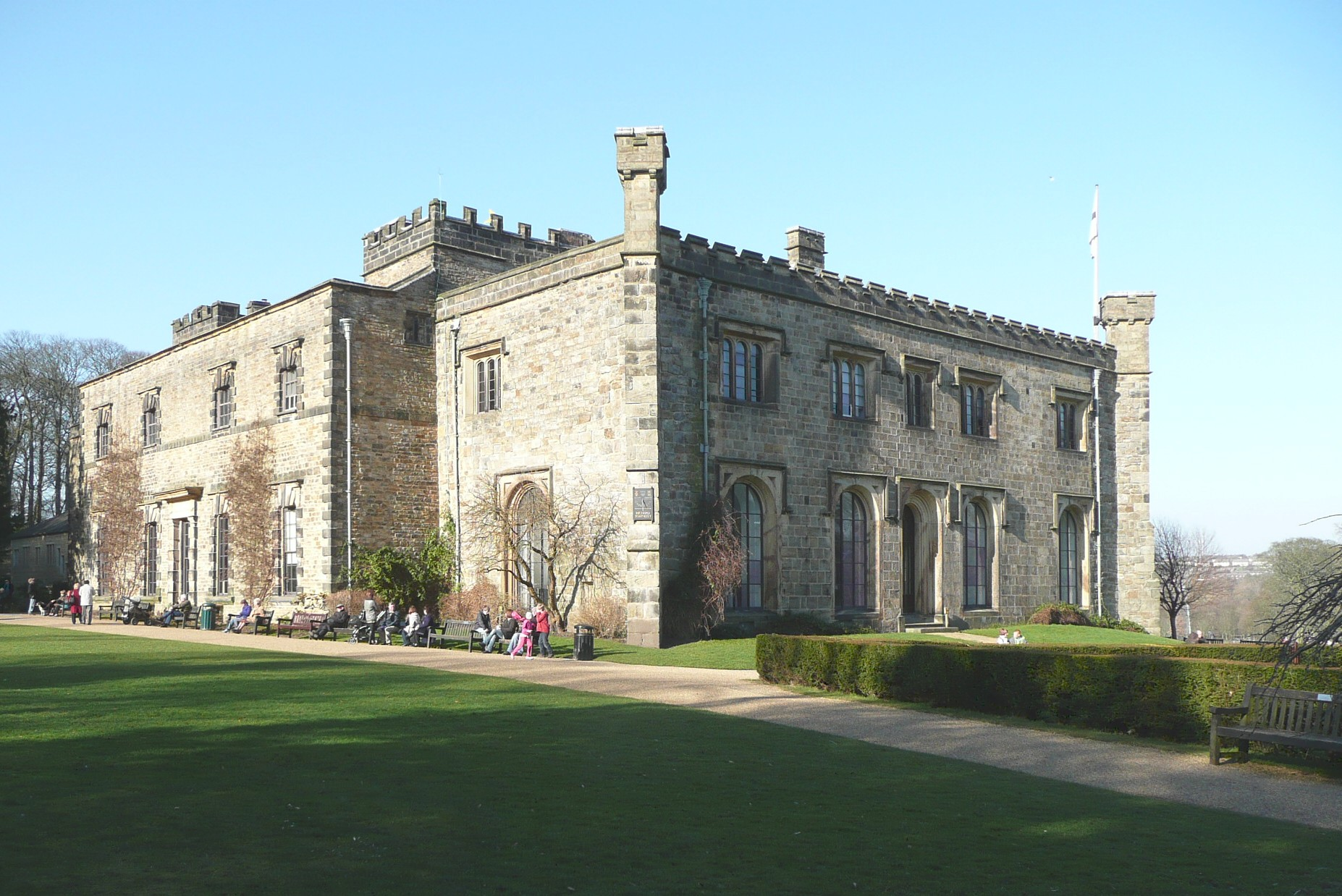
Towneley Hall

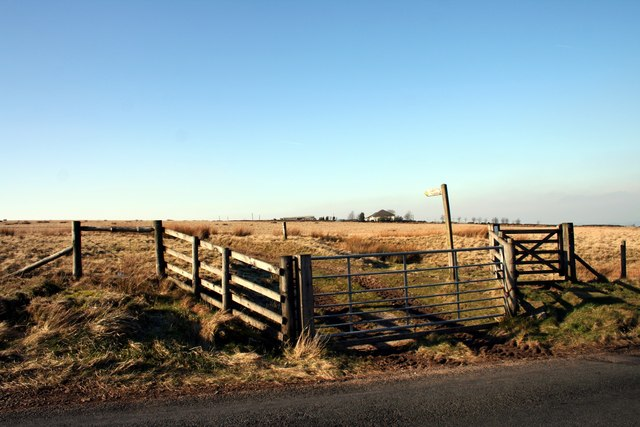
Crossing Crown Point Road in Habergham Eaves

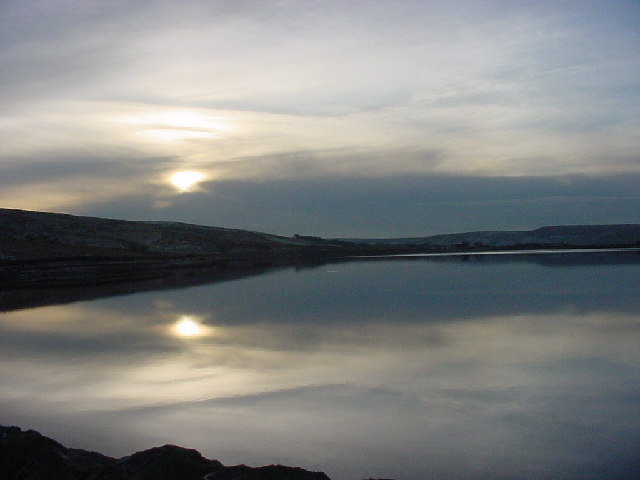
Clowbridge Reservoir, Dunnockshaw

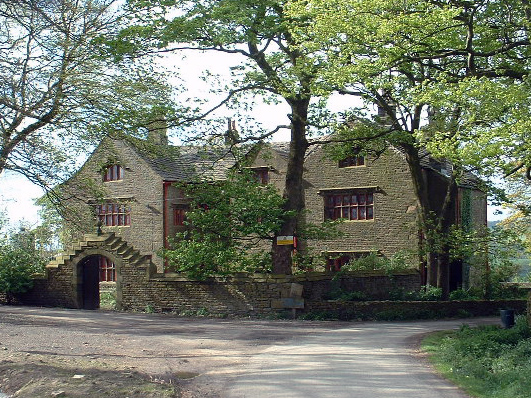
Shuttleworth Hall, Hapton

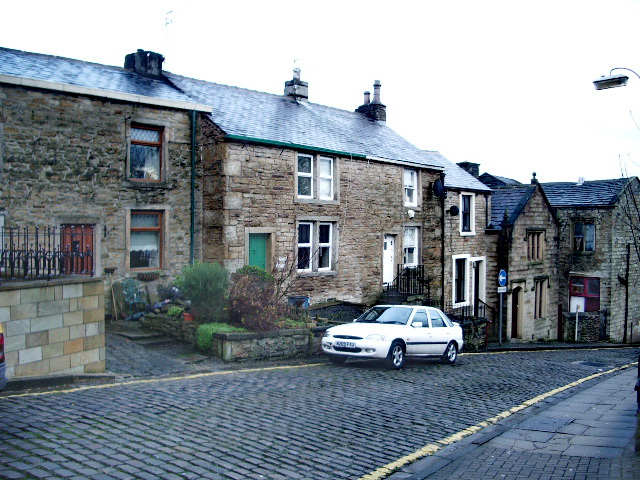
Mill Street, Padiham

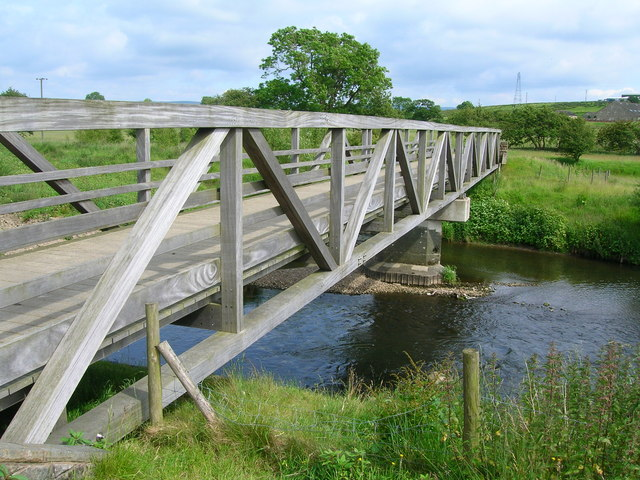
Bridge over the River Calder at Ightenhill

== See also ==
- Brontë Way
- Hyndburn Clog
- Mary Towneley Loop - Pennine Bridleway (National Trail)
- Pendle Way
