= Reyntiens =

Reyntiens is a surname. Notable people with the surname include:

- Patrick Reyntiens (1925–2021), British stained-glass artist
- Priscilla Reyntiens (1899–1991), British administrator
