= Listed buildings in Habergham Eaves =

Habergham Eaves is a civil parish in the borough of Burnley, Lancashire, England. It contains four buildings that are recorded in the National Heritage List for England as designated listed buildings, all of which are listed at Grade II. This grade is the lowest of the three gradings given to listed buildings and is applied to "buildings of national importance and special interest". The parish was originally entirely rural, but there has since been residential and industrial encroachment from Burnley in its northern parts. The listed buildings consist of two farmhouses, a cross base, and a group of coke ovens.

== Buildings ==
Name and location	Photograph	Date	Notes
Cross base 53.77074°N 2.26253°W		Medieval (possible)	The base of a former butter cross is in an isolated position in a field. It is a single cubical block of stone, partly sunk. In the centre of the top is a square socket for a shaft.
Lower Micklehurst Farmhouse; 53.76763°N 2.27215°W		Late 16th century (probable)	This originated either as a farmhouse or a wing of a larger house. It is in whitewashed rendered sandstone with stone-slate roofs. The building consists of two unequal units in two storeys with a single-storey wing. The windows vary, and include some that are mullioned.
Habergham Hall Farmhouse; 53.77551°N 2.27320°W		18th century	A sandstone farmhouse with a stone-slate roof, in two storeys and three bays, with single-storey extension on the east side. The windows are mullioned and contain sashes.
Coke ovens 53.77321°N 2.23094°W	—	c. 1850	A group of coke ovens in brick with a sandstone retaining wall, partly ruinous. There were originally two rows of six ovens forming a rectangular block. Each oven has a circular plan with a domed vault.
