= Worsthorne-with-Hurstwood =

Civil parish in Lancashire, England

Coordinates: 53.78°N 2.18°W

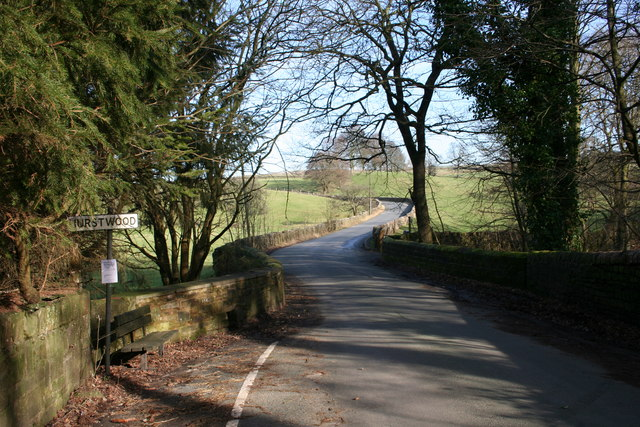
- Entering the parish across Salterford Bridge

- Shown within Burnley Borough Location within Lancashire
- Area: 5.60 sq mi (14.5 km^{2})
- Population: 2,963 (2011)
  - Density: 529/sq mi (204/km^{2})
- OS grid reference: SD875325
- Civil parish: Worsthorne-with-Hurstwood
- District: Burnley
- Shire county: Lancashire
- Region: North West
- Country: England
- Sovereign state: United Kingdom
- Post town: BURNLEY
- Postcode district: BB10
- Dialling code: 01282
- Police: Lancashire
- Fire: Lancashire
- Ambulance: North West
- UK Parliament: Burnley

Worsthorne-with-Hurstwood is a civil parish in the Borough of Burnley, in Lancashire, England. Situated on the eastern outskirts of Burnley, in 2011 it had a population of 2,963.

The parish contains part of the Pike Hill and Brownside suburbs of Burnley, the village of Worsthorne although this finishes at the sunshine houses and the hamlet of Hurstwood and the rural area east of the town.

The parish adjoins the Borough of Burnley parishes of Briercliffe and Cliviger, the unparished area of Burnley and the West Yorkshire district of Calderdale.

== History ==
The second element in the name Worsthorne is probably from the Old English þorn, a thorny bush. Its first is less certain, possibly worþ (homestead) or a personal name as in Worthing. With Hurstwood, hyrst is thought to mean a wooded prominence, as 'wood' (OE wudu) has been appended, it may just mean a prominence in this case.

A Bronze Age round cairn and bowl barrow are located on Hameldon Pasture, with a ring cairn nearby on Slipper Hill. The remains of two Romano-British farmsteads known as Ring Stones camp is also in the area. All are protected as Scheduled monuments. Traces of a Roman road have been reported heading north-west from Ring Stones.

After the Norman conquest of England, the area may have been part of Briercliffe township, and the lords of Clitheroe appear to have divided Worsthorne among a number of free tenants. In 1292 Henry de Lacy granted the homage and service of the free tenants of Worsthorne to Oliver de Stansfield, his receiver for Pontefract. In 1311 Worsthorne was listed as a manor, and by 1332 it was regarded as an independent township. Control of the manor would stay with the Stansfield family until 1560.

During World War II a Starfish site bombing decoy was constructed off Gorple Road to the east of Worsthorne, part of a network designed to protect Accrington. Also a B-24 Liberator from the 491st Bombardment Group USAAF crashed on Black Hameldon in February 1945.

== Geography ==
Hurstwood and Cant Clough reservoirs are in the south-east of the parish, both are passed by the Mary Towneley Loop section of the Pennine Bridleway National Trail and the Burnley Way footpath. Swinden and Lea Green reservoirs are in the north on the boundary with Briercliffe.

== Governance ==
Worsthorne-with-Hurstwood was once a township in the ancient parish of Whalley. This became a civil parish in 1866, forming part of the Burnley Rural District from 1894. Since 1974 Worsthorne-with-Hurstwood has formed part of the Borough of Burnley.

The parish is part of the Cliviger with Worsthorne ward of the borough council, along with the neighbouring parish of Cliviger. The ward elects three councillors, currently Beki Hughes and Jack Launer of the Green Party and Ivor Emo (Conservative). The parish is represented on Lancashire County Council as part of the Burnley Rural division, represented since 2017 by Cosima Towneley (Conservative).

The Member of Parliament for Burnley, the constituency into which the parish falls, is Oliver Ryan of the Labour Party, who was first elected in 2024.

== Demography ==
According to the United Kingdom Census 2011, the parish has a population of 2,963, a decrease from 2,986 in the 2001 census. This represents a decline of 0.8% over ten years. The parish has an area of 1,452 hectares (5.61 sq mi; 14.52 km^{2}), giving a population density of 2.04 inhabitants per hectare (530/sq mi; 204/km^{2}). The developed parts of the parish were included in the Burnley Built-up area, defined in the 2011 census which had a population of 149,422.

In 2011 the average (mean) age of residents was 44.7 years, with a distribution of 51.1% female and 48.9% male. The racial composition was 99% White (98% White British), 0.6% Asian and 0.6% Mixed. The largest religious groups were Christian (77.6%) and Muslim (0.2%). 71.6% of adults between the ages of 16 and 74 were classed as economically active and in work.

Population of Worsthorne-with-Hurstwood parish over time
Year	1901	1911	1921	1931	1951	1961	2001	2011
Population	852	1,101	1,326	1,239	1,606	1,640	2,986	2,963

== Media gallery ==
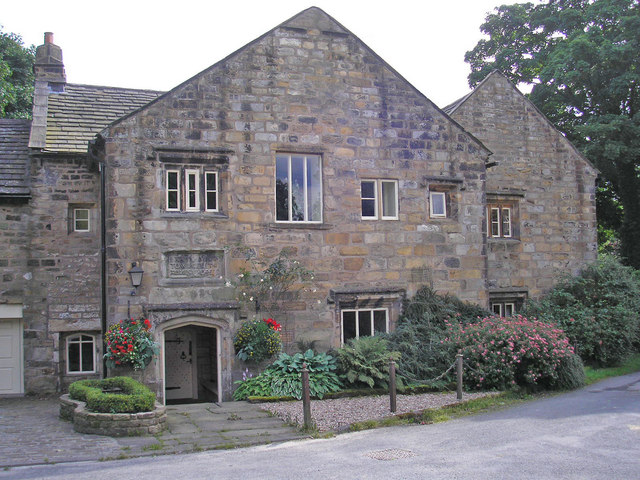
Hurstwood Hall, built in 1579

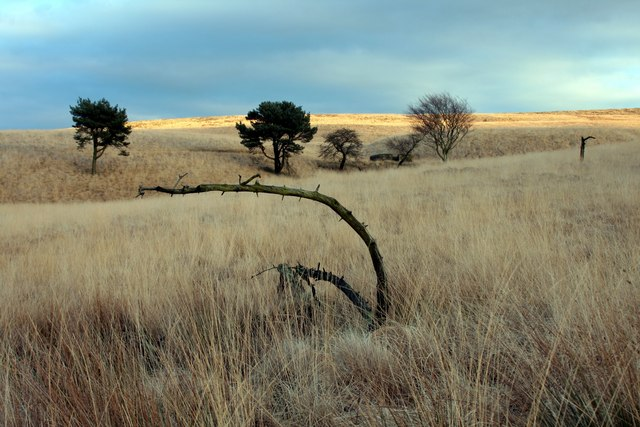
Shedden Heys

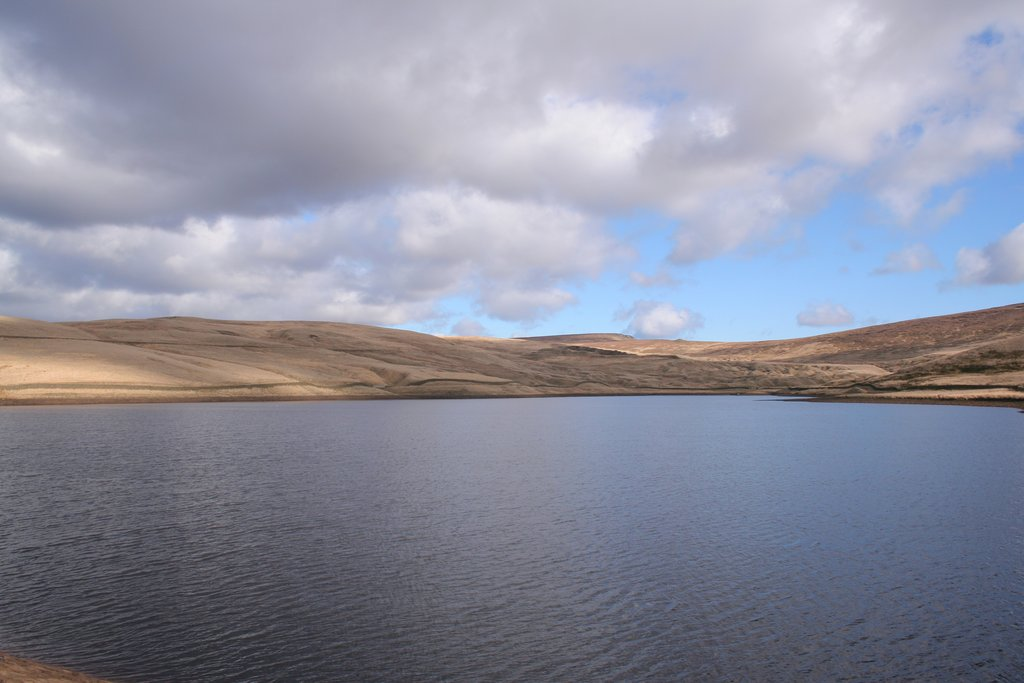
Cant Clough reservoir

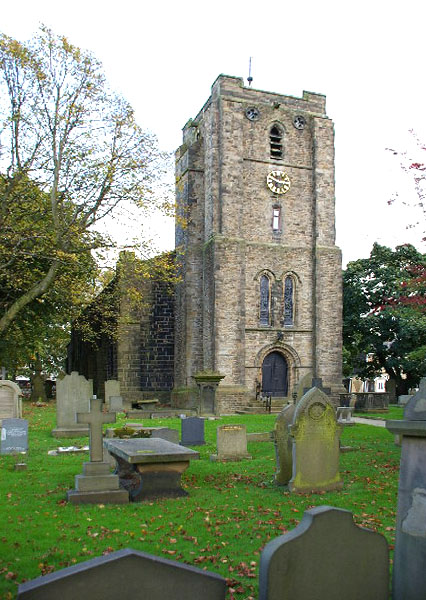
St John the Evangelist's Church, Worsthorne

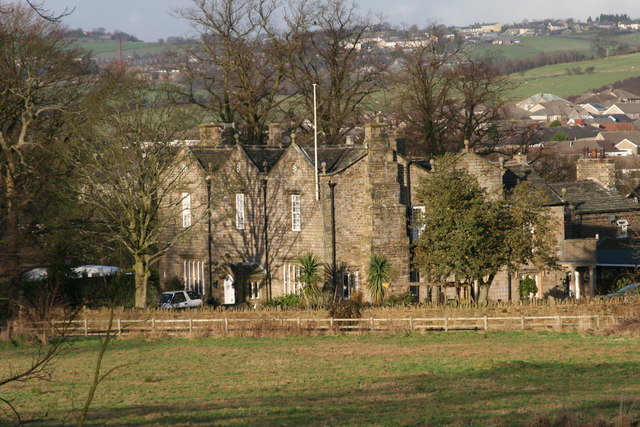
Hollins Hall

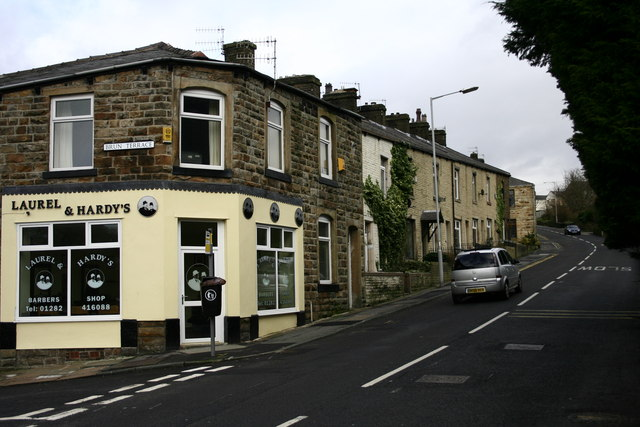
Brownside Road, Brownside

== See also ==
- Listed buildings in Worsthorne-with-Hurstwood
- Scheduled monuments in Lancashire
