= Borough of Burnley =

Borough in Lancashire, England

- Borough and non-metropolitan district
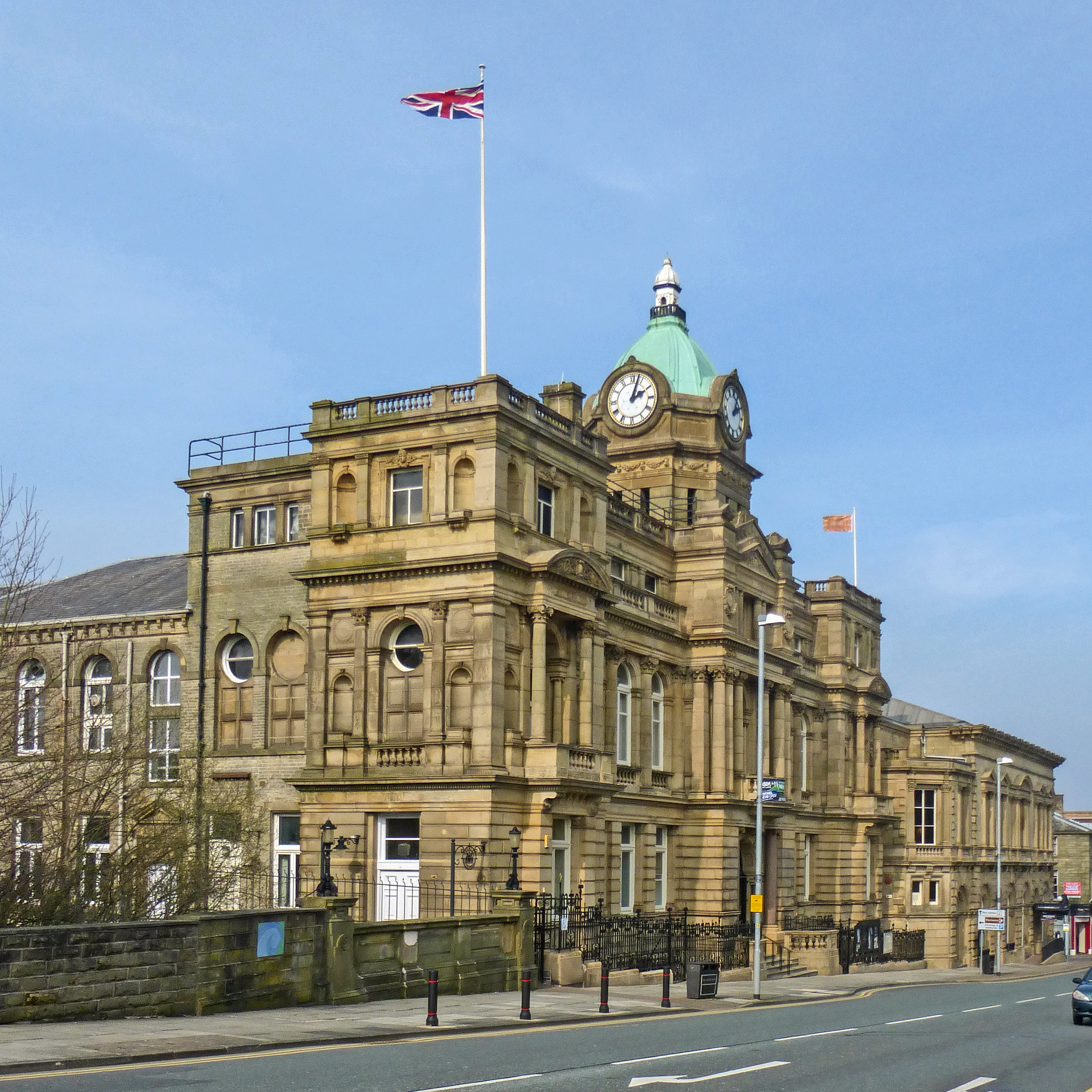
- Burnley Town Hall

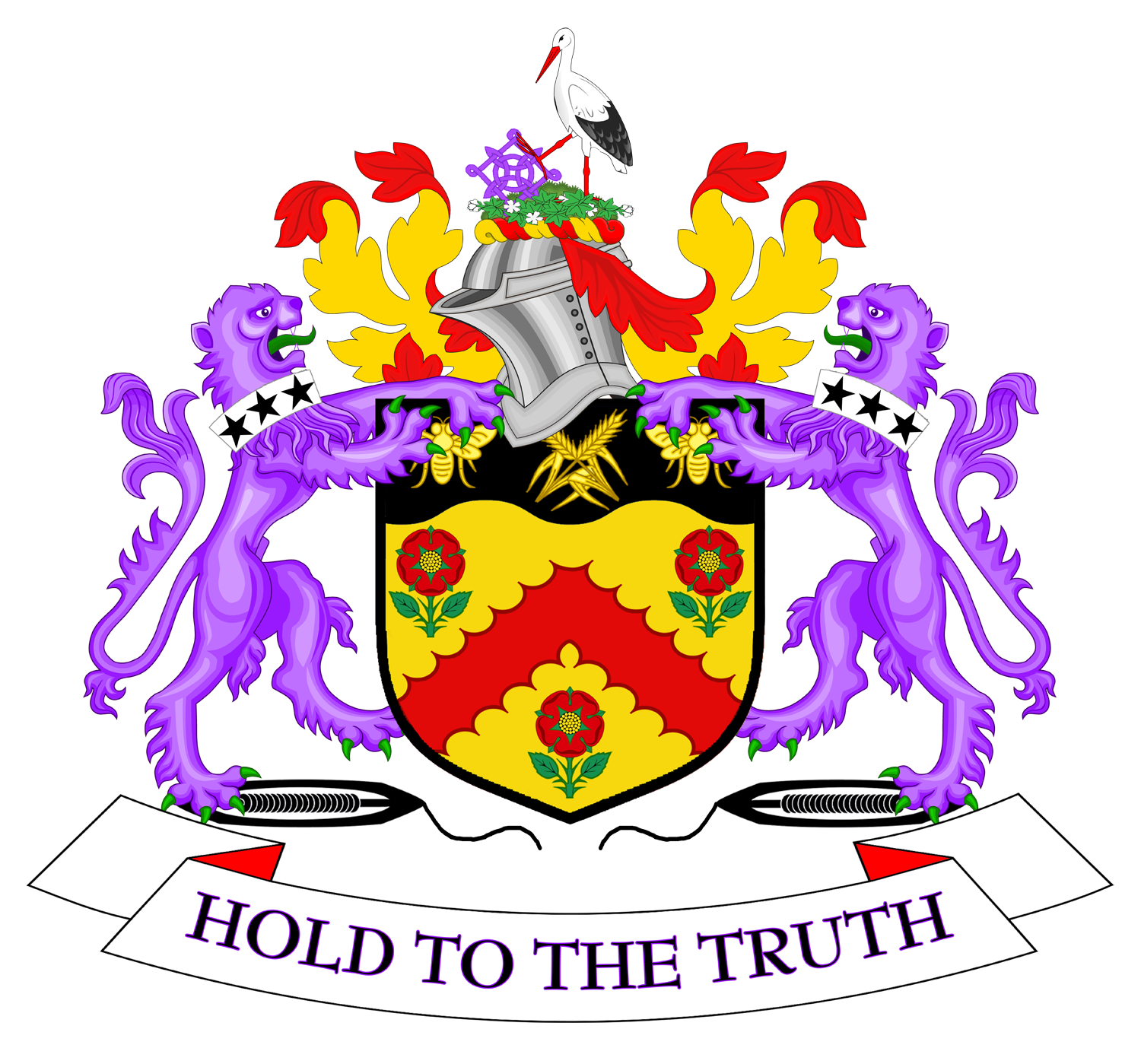
- Coat of Arms of the Borough Council

- Shown within ceremonial Lancashire
- Sovereign state: United Kingdom
- Constituent country: England
- Region: North West England
- Ceremonial county: Lancashire
- Admin. HQ: Burnley

Government
  - Type: Burnley Borough Council
  - MPs: Oliver Ryan

Area
  - Total: 43 sq mi (111 km^{2})
  - Rank: 186th

Population (2024)
  - Total: 99,233
  - Rank: Ranked 251st
  - Density: 2,320/sq mi (894/km^{2})

Ethnicity (2021)
  - Ethnic groups: List: 82.5% White; 14.7% Asian; 1.6% Mixed; 0.8% other; 0.3% Black

Religion (2021)
  - Religion: List: 48.2% Christianity; 31.5% no religion; 14% Islam; 5.4% not stated; 0.4% other; 0.2% Buddhism; 0.2% Hinduism; 0.1% Sikhism; 0.1% Judaism
- Time zone: UTC+0 (Greenwich Mean Time)
  - Summer (DST): UTC+1 (British Summer Time)
- Postcode: BB10-12
- Area code: 01282
- ONS code: 30UD (ONS); E07000117 (GSS)

The Borough of Burnley (/ˈbɜːrnli/) is a local government district with the borough status in Lancashire, England. It has an area of 42.9 square miles (111 km^{2}) and a population of 99,233 (2024), and is named after its largest town, Burnley. The borough also contains the town of Padiham along with several villages and surrounding rural areas.

The neighbouring districts are Rossendale, Hyndburn, Ribble Valley, Pendle and Calderdale.

== History ==
The town of Burnley had been governed by improvement commissioners from 1819. The commissioners were replaced in 1861 when the town was made a municipal borough, governed by a body formally called the "mayor, aldermen and burgesses of the borough of Burnley" but generally known as the corporation or town council. After elections, the corporation first met in January 1862 when Burnley's first mayor was appointed. When elected county councils were established in 1889, Burnley was considered large enough to provide its own county-level services, and so it became a county borough, independent from the new Lancashire County Council.

The modern district was created on 1 April 1974 under the Local Government Act 1972, covering the whole area of two former districts and part of a third, which were all abolished at the same time:

- Burnley County Borough
- Padiham Urban District
- Burnley Rural District (parishes of Briercliffe, Cliviger, Dunnockshaw, Habergham Eaves, Hapton, Ightenhill, North Town, Simonstone and Worsthorne-with-Hurstwood only, rest split between Pendle, Ribble Valley and Hyndburn)

The new district was named Burnley after the area's largest town. It was granted borough status from its creation, allowing the chair of the council to take the title of mayor, continuing Burnley's series of mayors dating back to 1862.

The parish of North Town (which had been created in 1894 from the parts of Padiham parish outside the urban district) was abolished in 1983, being absorbed into Simonstone. Simonstone was subsequently transferred to Ribble Valley in 1987, with some adjustments to its boundaries with neighbouring areas.

In 2007 a proposal to merge Burnley with neighbouring Pendle Borough Council to form a larger unitary authority was rejected by the government.

The creation of the Burnley Bondholders scheme, an initiative which brings together local firms to promote Burnley as a place for business saw Burnley awarded an Enterprising Britain award from the UK Government in 2013, for being the 'Most Enterprising Area in the UK'.

Under current local government reorganisation plans, all district councils in Lancashire, as well as the county council, will be abolished in 2028, with the district becoming part of a new Pennine Lancashire unitary authority.

== Governance ==
- See main article: Burnley Borough Council

== Geography ==
Places in the Borough of Burnley

The Borough of Burnley roughly covers the upper part of the catchment basin of the River Calder, a major tributary of the River Ribble. This includes the catchment of the River Brun, which meets the Calder in Burnley town centre, but not that of Pendle Water. The Calder has its source in the Cliviger gorge which cuts through the Pennines into Yorkshire, very close to that of the West Yorkshire river with the same name. The gorge is located in the south east of the district and separates the South Pennines to the east from the area known as the Forest of Rossendale to the south. After passing through Burnley, the Calder turns around Ighten Hill forming part of the northern boundary and exits the borough at the west once it has flowed through Padiham. The exceptions to this occur along the southern boundary. The River Irwell and its feeder Whitewell Brook both have their sources on Deerplay Moor in Cliviger. Another tributary, Limy Water begins in Dunnockshaw and supplies the Clowbridge Reservoir. All three flow south into Rossendale. Catlow Brook forms part of the northern boundary (from the Coldwell Reservoirs to Walverden Reservoir) before continuing as Walverden Water into Nelson in Pendle. The banks of the Calder on the western boundary lie approximately 70 metres (230 ft) AOD, but the hilltops on the eastern side—also the border between Lancashire and West Yorkshire—exceed 450 metres (1,480 ft) in several places. Hameldon Hill (409 metres (1,342 ft)) stands in the southwest corner, forming part of the boundary with Hyndburn.

The Burnley Way, a 40-mile (64 km) waymarked circular footpath, visits much of the district, also passing briefly into the Calderdale district of West Yorkshire. It is considered to start/end at the Weavers' Triangle Visitor Centre at Burnley Wharf on the Leeds and Liverpool Canal.

Name	Civil parish	Classification	Co-ordinates
Burnley	N/A	Town	53.789°N 2.248°W
Padiham	Padiham	Town	53.797°N 2.311°W
Hapton	Hapton	Village	53.780°N 2.315°W
Worsthorne	Worsthorne-with-Hurstwood	Village	53.788°N 2.191°W
Brownside	Worsthorne-with-Hurstwood	Hamlet	53.789°N 2.200°W
Walk Mill	Cliviger	Hamlet	53.768°N 2.210°W
Lane Bottom	Briercliffe	Hamlet	53.816°N 2.187°W
Mereclough	Cliviger	Hamlet	53.771°N 2.193°W
Southward Bottom	Cliviger	Hamlet	53.762°N 2.198°W
Overtown	Cliviger	Hamlet	53.766°N 2.196°W
Holme Chapel	Cliviger	Village	53.753°N 2.191°W
Hurstwood	Worsthorne-with-Hurstwood	Hamlet	53.779°N 2.182°W
Cockden	Briercliffe	Hamlet	53.810°N 2.192°W
Clowbridge	Dunnockshaw	Hamlet	53.750°N 2.267°W
Dunnockshaw	Dunnockshaw	Hamlet	53.746°N 2.280°W
Rogerham	Briercliffe	Hamlet	53.800°N 2.180°W

=== Media gallery ===
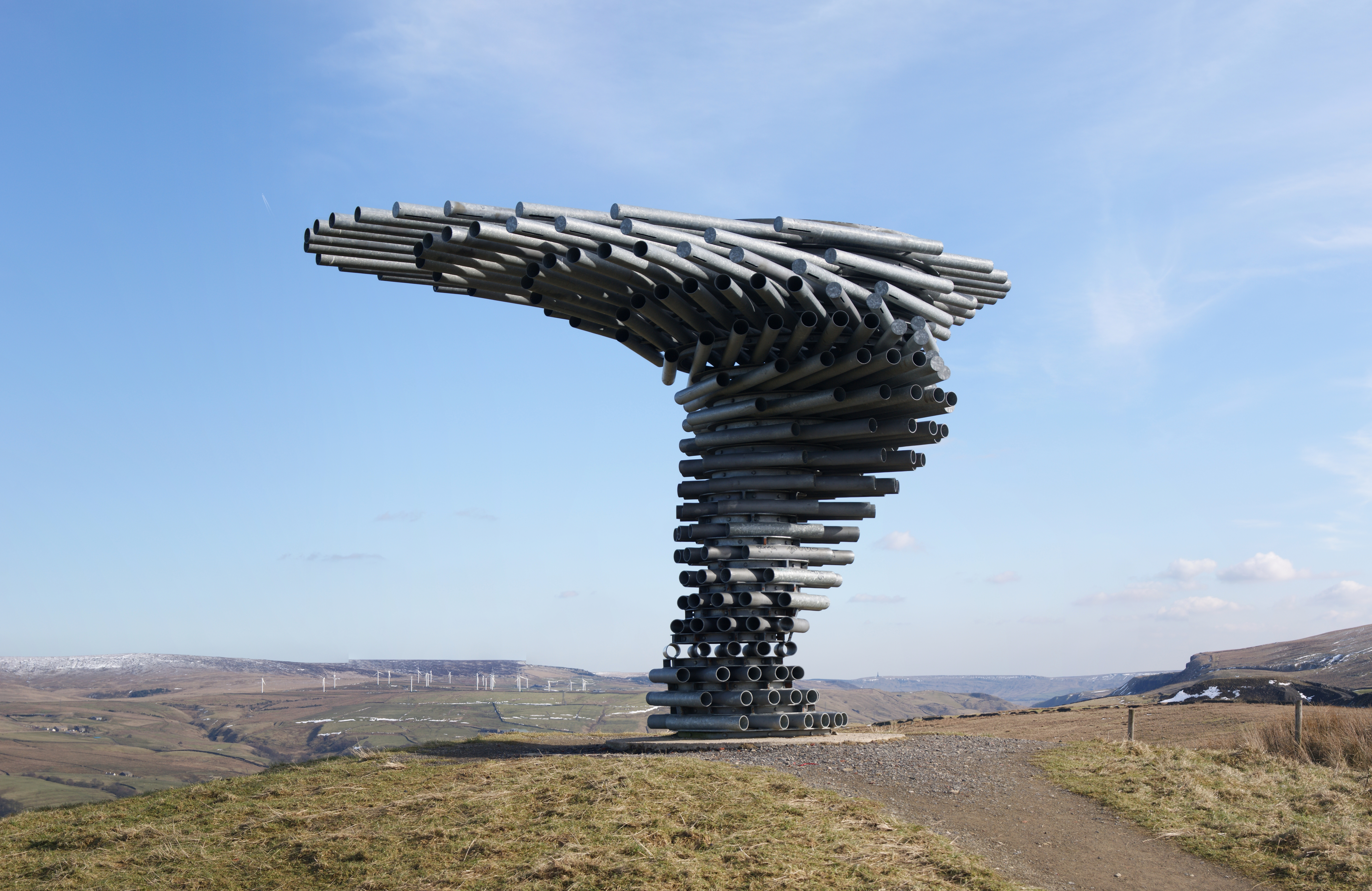
The Singing Ringing Tree, overlooking Burnley.

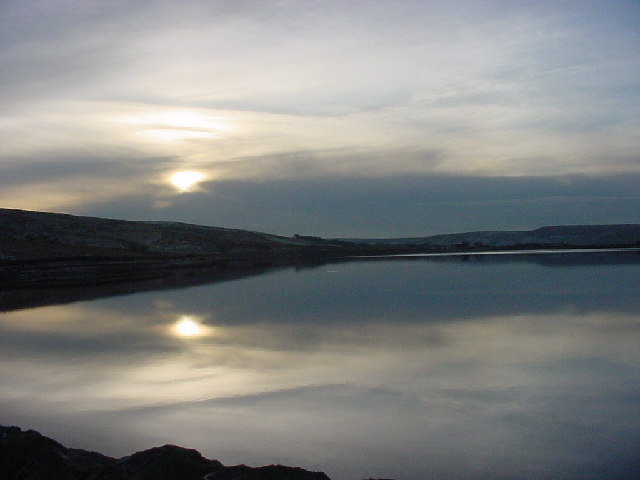
Clowbridge Reservoir, Dunnockshaw.

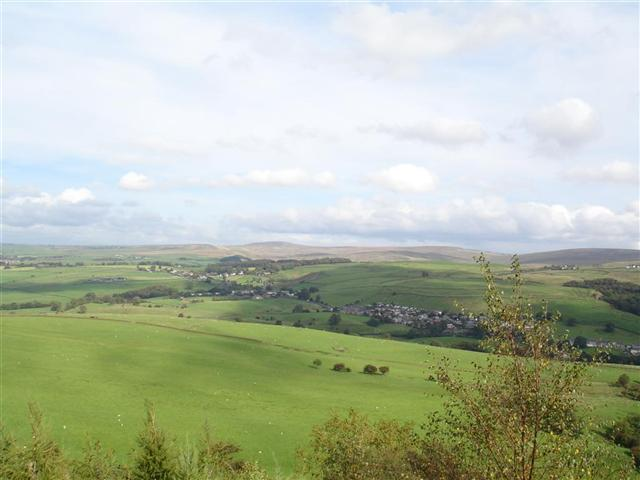
The Cliviger gorge that cuts through the Pennines into Yorkshire.

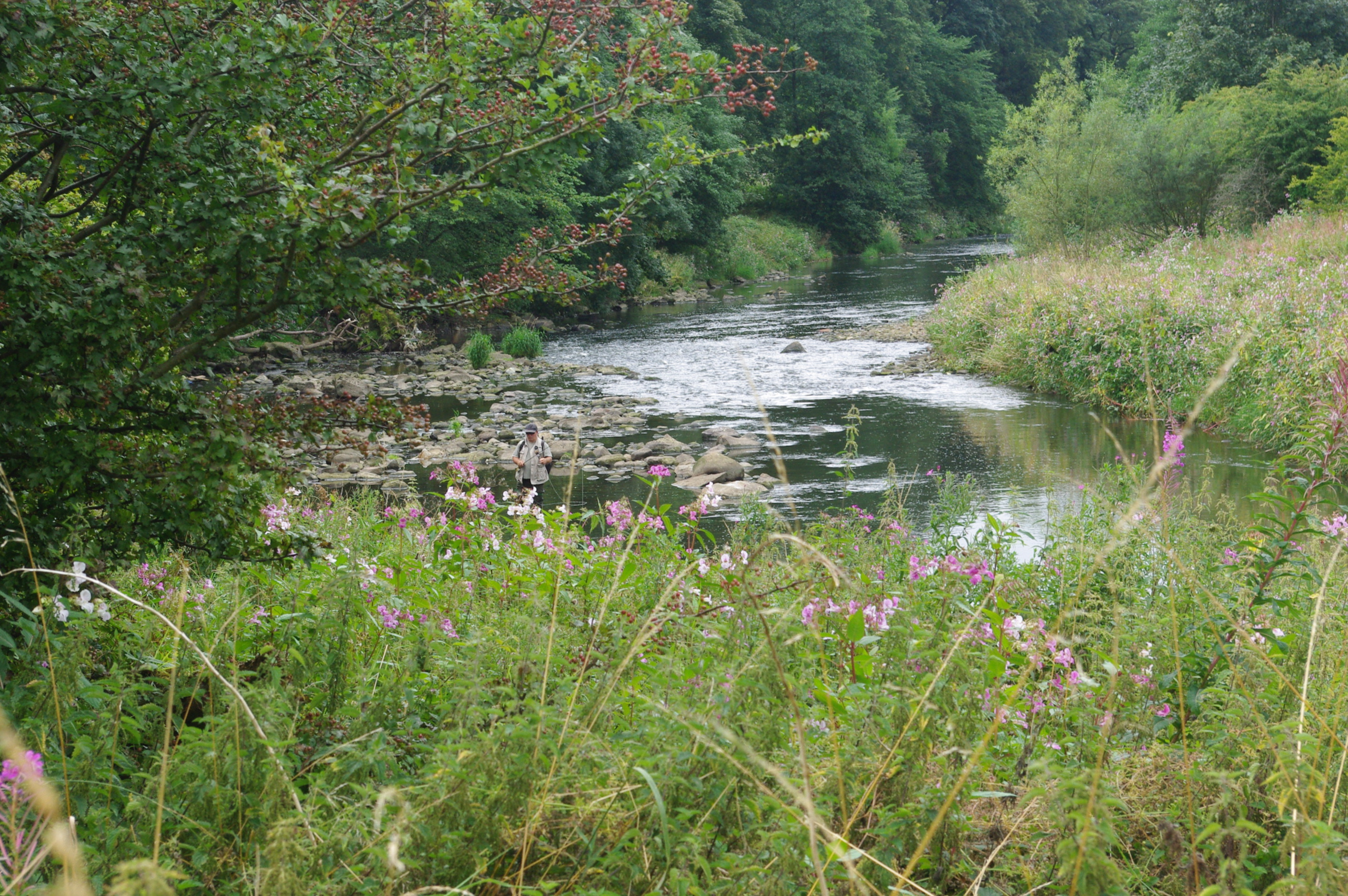
River Calder near Gawthorpe Hall.

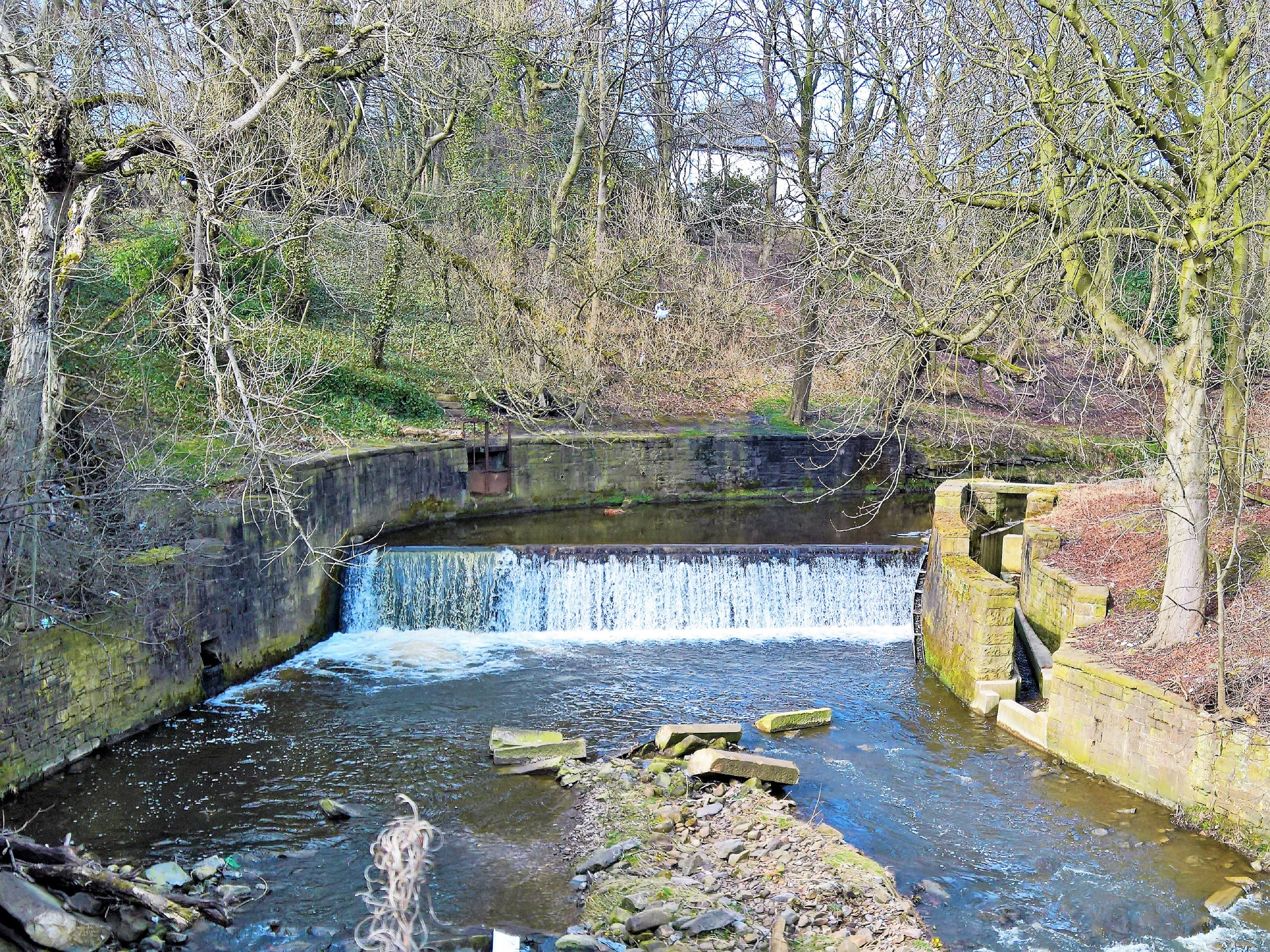
The old weir on the River Brun near Bank Hall in Burnley.

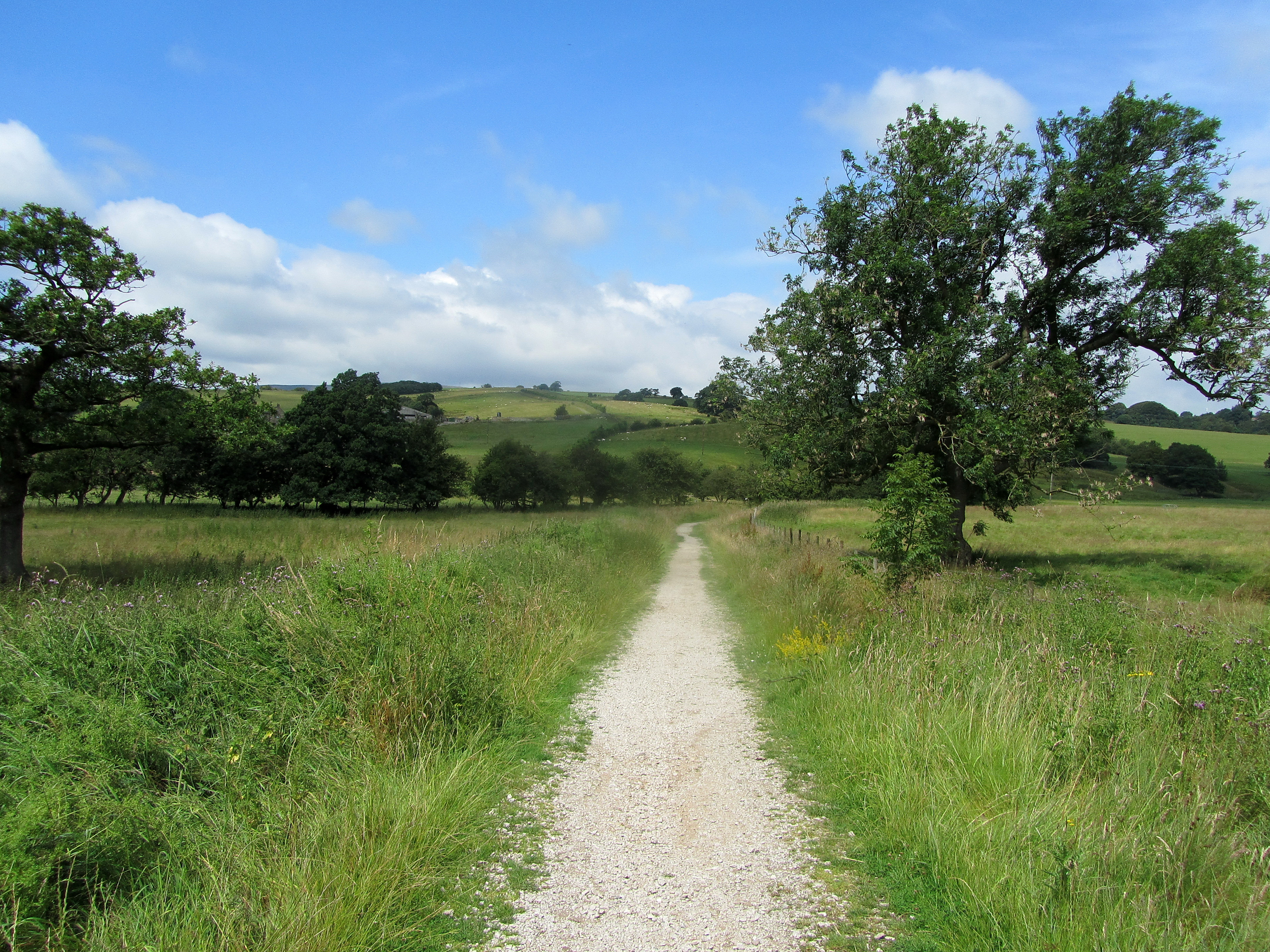
On the Burnley Way in Ightenhill. The footpath circles the borough.

== Towns and parishes ==
Civil parishes: 1.Briercliffe, 2.Cliviger, 3.Dunnockshaw, 4.Habergham Eaves 5.Hapton, 6.Ightenhill, 7.Padiham, 8.Worsthorne-with-Hurstwood

The borough contains eight civil parishes. The parish council of Padiham takes the style "town council". The central part of the borough, roughly corresponding to the pre-1974 borough of Burnley, is an unparished area. The parishes are:

- Briercliffe
- Cliviger
- Dunnockshaw
- Habergham Eaves
- Hapton
- Ightenhill
- Padiham
- Worsthorne-with-Hurstwood

Padiham was also unparished from the abolition of its old urban district council in 1974 until a new parish was created in 2002, covering a similar area to the old urban district.

== Demography ==
The Borough of Burnley compared
UK Census 2021	Burnley	NW England	England
Total population	94,646	7,417,397	56,490,048
Foreign born	12.7%	11.7%	17.4%
White	82.5%	85.6%	81.0%
Asian	14.7%	8.4%	9.6%
Black	0.3%	2.3%	4.2%
Christian	48.2%	52.5%	46.3%
Muslim	14.0%	7.6%	6.7%
Hindu	0.2%	0.7%	1.8%
No religion	31.5%	32.6%	36.7%
Under 19	23.1%	23.4%	23.1%
Over 65	17.9%	18.7%	18.3%
Unemployed	3.6%	3.4%	3.5%
Perm. sick / disabled	6.7%	5.3%	4.1%

The borough's population has fallen from a high of 130,339 in 1911 to an estimated 87,700 in 2005. Between 1991 and 2001, it fell by 2.6%. Its employment rate of 59.0% places it 261st out of 376 local authorities in England & Wales; just 12.6% of its workforce are graduates, placing it 325th out of 376 local authorities.

The 2001 census recorded the population as 89,542 and the average (mean) age of residents was 37.7 years. The area of 11,070 hectares (42.7 sq mi; 110.7 km^{2}), giving a population density of 8.09 inhabitants per hectare (2,100/sq mi; 809/km^{2}). The gender makeup of the population was 43,408 male and 46,134 female. 64.3% of residents aged 16 to 74 were classed as economically active, with 0.8% long-term unemployed, but 8.9% classified as long-term sick or disabled. The largest employment sectors were manufacturing 29.3%, wholesale and retail trade including motor vehicle repairs 18.2%, and health and social work 12.9%. The ethnic makeup of the district was 91.8% white and 7.2% Asian, with the other ethnic minorities and people of mixed heritage making up the remaining 1%.

A 2010 report commissioned by the BBC and compiled by Experian ranked the borough as having the second lowest property prices in England, this combined with GCSE results and crime rates, led to the borough being ranked as the worst place in England.

By the 2011 census the population was 87,059 (a decline of 2.9% from 2001). The average age of residents had increased to 39.4 years. The population density then 7.86 inhabitants per hectare (2,040/sq mi; 786/km^{2}). The gender makeup of the population was 42,794 male and 44,265 female. 66.1% of residents aged 16 to 74 were classed as economically active, with 2.1% long-term unemployed and 7% long-term sick or disabled. The largest employment sectors continued to be manufacturing 17.9%, wholesale and retail trade including motor vehicle repairs 16.7%, and health and social work 15.7%. The ethnic makeup of the district had shifted slightly to 87.4% white and 11% Asian, with other ethnic minorities and mixed-heritage people at 1.6%.

At the 2021 census the population was 94,646 (an increase of 8.7% from 2011). The population density then 8.55 inhabitants per hectare (2,210/sq mi; 855/km^{2}). The gender makeup of the population was 46,797 male and 47,849 female. 56.8% of residents aged 16 and over were classed as economically active, with 3.6% unemployed and 6.7% long-term sick or disabled. Although the largest employers continued to be in the same sectors, the mix had changed to wholesale and retail trade including motor vehicle repairs 19.6%, health and social work 17.2% and manufacturing 14.4%. The ethnic makeup of the district then 82.5% white and 14.7% Asian, with other ethnic minorities and mixed-heritage people at 2.8%.

=== Ethnicity ===
Ethnic Group	Year									
Ethnic Group	1981 estimations		1991 census		2001 census		2011 census		2021 census	
Ethnic Group	Number	%	Number	%	Number	%	Number	%	Number	%
White: Total	87,755	96.5%	86,988	94.3%	82,171	91.7%	76,054	87.3%	78,112	82.5%
White: British (Note: New category created for the 2001 census)	–	–	–	–	80,685	90.1	74,464	85.5	73,752	77.9%
White: Irish	–	–	–	–	848	0.9	527	0.6	457	
White: Gypsy or Irish Traveller (Note: New category created for the 2011 census)	–	–	–	–			10	0.0	83	
White: Roma	–	–	–	–					106	
White: Other	–	–	–	–	638	0.7	1,053	1.2	3,714	
Asian or Asian British: Total	2,888	3.2%	4,795	5.2%	6,527	7.3%	9,578	11.1%	13,930	14.7%
Asian or Asian British: Indian	225		302		426	0.5	321	0.4	378	
Asian or Asian British: Pakistani	1996		3260		4,426	4.9	5,924	6.8	10,102	
Asian or Asian British: Bangladeshi	512		991		1,411	1.6	2,425	2.8	2,737	
Asian or Asian British: Chinese (Note: In 2001, listed under the 'Other ethnic group' heading.)	75		105		118	0.1	222	0.3	164	
Asian or Asian British: Other Asian	80		137		146	0.2	686	0.8	549	
Black or Black British: Total	154		216		121	0.1%	211	0.2%	326	
Black or Black British: African	53		66		72	0.1	76	0.1	180	
Black or Black British: Caribbean	30		45		37	0.0	120	0.1	95	
Black or Black British: Other Black	71		105		12	0.0	15	0.0	51	
Mixed or British Mixed: Total	–	–	–	–	630		976	1.1%	1,505	
Mixed: White and Black Caribbean	–	–	–	–	130	0.1	228	0.3	191	
Mixed: White and Black African	–	–	–	–	78	0.1	90	0.1	165	
Mixed: White and Asian	–	–	–	–	332	0.4	476	0.5	826	
Mixed: Other Mixed	–	–	–	–	90	0.1	182	0.2	323	
Other: Total	139		202		93		240	0.3%	778	
Other: Arab	–	–	–	–	–	–	55	0.1	157	
Other: Any other ethnic group					93	0.1	185	0.2	621	
Non-White: Total	3,181	3.5%	5,213	5.7%	7,371		11,005		16,539	
Total	90,936	100%	92,201	100%	89,542	100%	87,059	100%	94,651	100%

== Economy ==
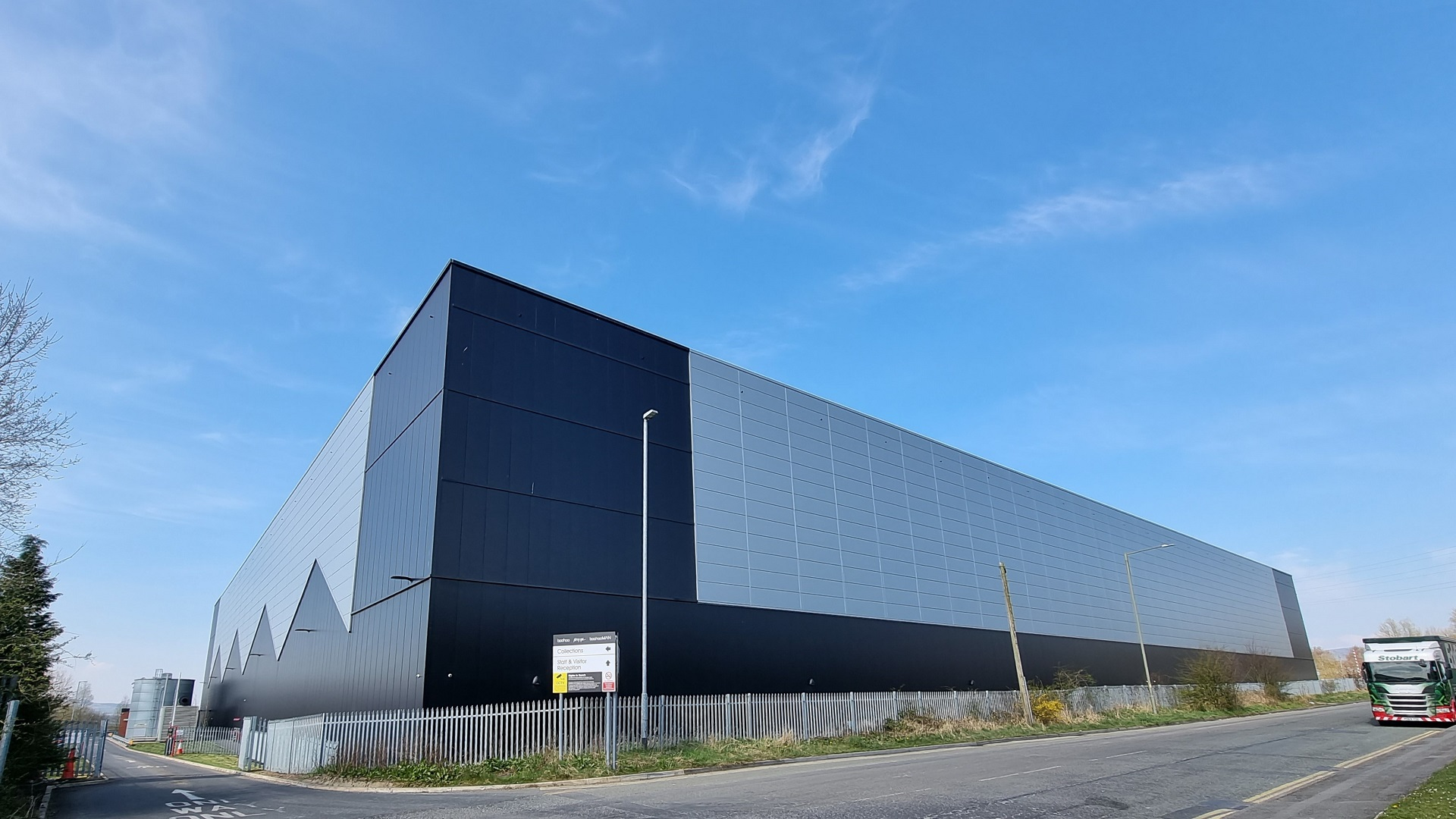
Eastern section of the Boohoo distribution centre at Heasandford.

There are several industrial estates and business parks within the borough of varying ages and sizes. The largest are:

- Burnley Bridge Business Park

A new 70-acre (28 ha) development in Hapton parish, to the south of Padiham. It is connected to Junction 9 of the M65 motorway via a bridge over the Leeds and Liverpool Canal.

- Network 65 Business Park

Also located in Hapton on the western side of Burnley, on the south side of M65 Junction 9. Owned by Burnley Council, occupiers include GlenDimplex.

- Rossendale Road Industrial Estate

Located in Habergham Eaves on the western side of Burnley, occupiers include The Original Factory Shop, Warburtons and VEKA. The AMS Technology Park has been developed here, focused on advanced technology manufacturers, principally AMS Neve.

- Heasandford Industrial Estate

Situated on the eastern side of Burnley crossing into Briercliffe, occupiers include boohoo.com and Safran Aircelle. It has seen recent expansion with the Innovation Drive development.

- Shuttleworth Mead Business Park

Located west of Padiham, on the former Padiham Power Station site (closed 1993). Occupiers include Graham and Brown and Whatmore UK.

There are also a number of smaller sites throughout historically industrial parts of Burnley. Burnham Gate Trading Estate was the site of Duckett's earthen sanitary ware works. Smallshaw & Chestnut Business Park was built over part of the railway sidings connected with Rose Grove railway station. Elm Street and Gannow Business Parks along with Healeywood Industrial Estate all incorporate converted Victorian cotton mill buildings. Empire Business Park, located between Rosegrove and Lowerhouse also opened in 2008.

== Public services ==
=== Education ===
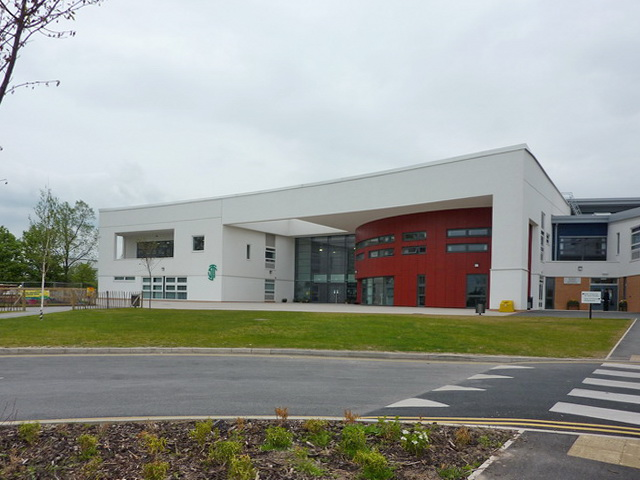
Sir John Thursby Community College (opened in 2009)

Education Services in the borough are provided and controlled by Lancashire County Council.

=== Fire and rescue ===
Fire and rescue services in the borough are provided by Lancashire Fire and Rescue Service and controlled by Lancashire County Council.

=== Health ===
Health services in the borough are provided by East Lancashire Primary Care Trust and East Lancashire Hospitals NHS Trust, with additional services provided by the North West Ambulance Service and North West Air Ambulance.

The Hospital Trust operates Burnley General Hospital, while the PCT operates the network of GP surgeries, and recently opened 2 Primary Health Care Centres in the borough (St. Peters Centre in 2006 and Briercliffe in 2007).

=== Housing and construction ===
In 2000 Burnley Council transferred its stock of around 5300 council houses to Burnley & Padiham Community Housing. Re-branded as Calico Homes in 2004, a nod to the cotton fabric historically so important to the area's economic success, the housing association has since grown and diversified into construction, support and training. The council is still able nominate tenants, prioritised by need, to Calico and the other associations that provide accommodation in the borough. All have agreements stipulating that they will allocate approximately half of their vacancies to council nominees.

Burnley Council's development control team deals with planning permission applications within the borough, subject to appeal to the Government Planning Inspectorate. The council adopted a new planning framework in July 2018, which sets out the overall development strategy for the district up to 2032.

=== Museums and libraries ===
The museum at Towneley Hall is owned, funded and managed by the borough council. Queen Street Mill Textile Museum is owned and operated by Lancashire County Council. Since cost-cutting measures saw a temporary closure of the site, a transfer to another operator, possibly the National Trust, is reportedly being investigated. Gawthorpe Hall on the edge of Padiham is owned by the National Trust but managed by the county council.

The county council is also responsible for library provision in the district. As well as the Central Library in Burnley there are smaller sites at Padiham Town Hall, Burnley Campus in Daneshouse, on Coal Clough Lane, and Pike Hill. The mobile library service also serves the area.

=== Parks and green public spaces ===
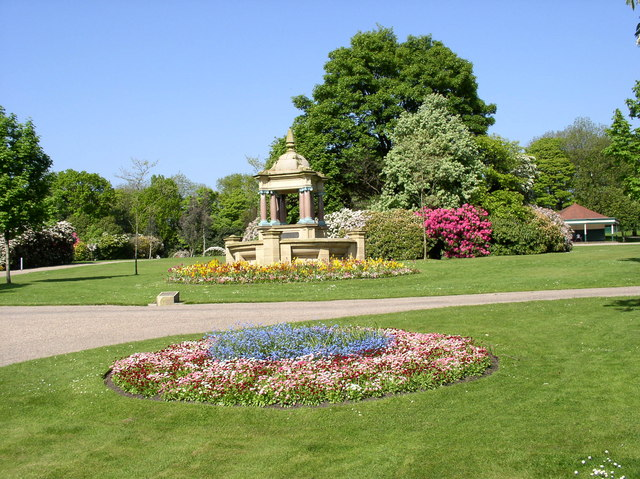
Queens Park

The borough council owns and manages six Green Flag Award parks: Ightenhill Park, Padiham Memorial Park, Queens Park, Scott Park, Thompson Park, and Towneley Park. In addition it is also responsible for the maintenance of over 500 hectares (1,200 acres) of public woodlands and informal open spaces including: Byerden Holme Linear Park in Stoneyholme; Cemetery Wood near Rosegrove; Healey Heights in Rosehill; Rowley Lake and woodland in Brunshaw. Additionally Gawthorpe Hall is situated within over 16 hectares (40 acres) of wooded grounds.

=== Policing ===
Policing Services in the borough are provided by the Pennine division of Lancashire Constabulary based at Burnley Police station, and controlled by Lancashire County Council. Plans are in place to merge the pennine division into the neighbouring eastern division, based in Blackburn. Policing Services of the borough's Railways are provided by Pennine division of the British Transport Police – the nearest Transport Police office being in Preston.

=== Sports and leisure ===
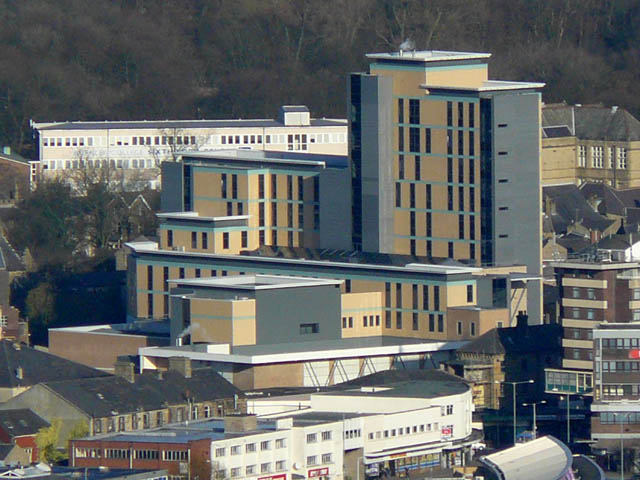
St Peter's Centre (opened in 2006)

From 2014, management of the majority of the borough's leisure facilities has been transferred from Burnley Council's sport and culture services department to the Burnley Leisure trust, a registered charity. Overseen by a board of trustees made up of local community members, the trust works in partnership with the council to deliver cultural services, leisure facilities, sport and play development, and promotion of healthy lifestyles.

As of 2021, the trust operates the following sites:

- Barden Athletics Track – 400m synthetic running track and grass pitches.
- The Boathouse, Thompson Park – Cafe with boat hire.
- Burnley Mechanics Theatre
- Padiham Leisure Centre – Swimming, gym, sauna, cycling studio, tennis.
- Prairie Sports Village – Golf driving range, floodlit 3G football pitches.
- St Peter's Leisure Centre – Swimming, gym, squash, multi-sports halls, cycling and dance studios, and a spa.
- Towneley Golf – Full 18 hole golf course and separate nine hole course, 18 hole pitch and putt, and a footgolf course.

Also the council's green spaces team still manage sports pitches and courts at: Briercliffe Recreation Ground (football), Ightenhill Park (tennis), Padiham Fennyfold Playing Fields (football), Hapton Recreation Ground (football), Prairie Playing Fields (football, rugby), Scott Park (tennis), Sycamore Avenue (juniors football), Towneley Park (football, tennis), Queens Park (football, tennis).

=== Waste and recycling ===
Refuse and Recycling Collections, and Street Cleansing services are the responsibly of the borough council, and these services are currently contracted to Urbaser Ltd.

The borough Council has signed up to Lancashire's Municipal Waste Management Strategy, which specifies that the borough must recycle or compost 56% of all waste by 2015 and 61% by 2020.

There are currently 2 household waste recycling centres run by Lancashire County Council in the borough. One located on Grosvenor Street in Burnley and the second on Park Road in Padiham. Lancashire County Councils long-term plans to replace the Burnley site with facility at Heasandford Industrial Estate on the north eastern edge of the town, where approved in 2010 despite local objections regarding the site's suitability. 3 months later they then announced the closure of the Padiham site as part of cost-cutting measures, increasing the unsuitability of the new Burnley site's location.

== Freedom of the Borough ==
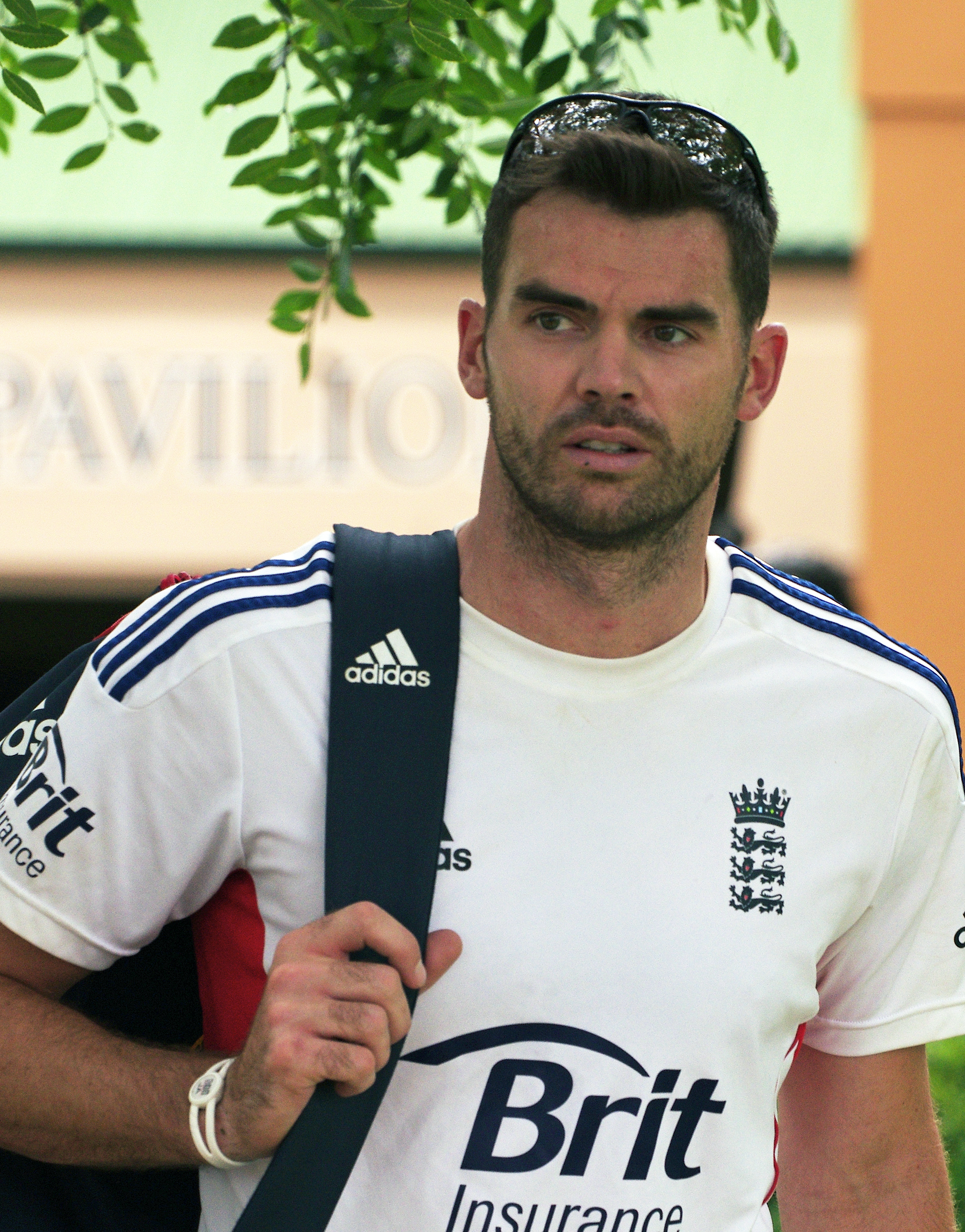
Cricketer James Anderson

The following people and military units have received the Freedom of the Borough of Burnley.

=== Individuals ===
- James McIlroy: December 2008.
- James Anderson: 8 December 2011.
- Mark Crabtree: 22 October 2021.

=== Military Units ===
- HMS Active, RN: 1989.
- The Duke of Lancaster's Regiment: 2013.

== See also ==
- Listed buildings in Burnley
- Borough status in the United Kingdom
- List of administrative counties and county boroughs of England by population in 1971
- List of English districts by population
- Burnley (UK Parliament constituency) (same boundaries as the Borough of Burnley)
