= East Lancashire =

East Lancashire (East Lancs) refers to the eastern part of Lancashire, a ceremonial county in North West England. It can also refer to:

- Pennine Lancashire, local government district to be created in 2028, previously referred to as East Lancashire

== Health ==
- East Lancashire Hospitals NHS Trust
- East Lancashire Primary Care Trust

== Military ==
- East Lancashire Regiment, a British Army infantry regiment from 1881 to 1958
- East Lancashire Royal Engineers, a British Army unit raised in 1901
- 42nd (East Lancashire) Infantry Division, formerly called the East Lancashire Division
- 42nd (East Lancashire) Signal Regiment, a British Army Territorial unit raised in 1908
- 66th (2nd East Lancashire) Division, a British Army Territorial unit raised in 1914
- 126th (East Lancashire) Brigade, a British Army unit raised in 1908

== Sports ==
- East Lancashire Cricket Club, a cricket club in the Lancashire League
- East Lancashire derby, a football match between Blackburn Rovers F.C. and Burnley F.C.
- East Lancashire Lions, a rugby league club from Darwen

== Transport ==
- East Lancashire Coachbuilders, a Blackburn-based manufacturer of bus bodywork
- East Lancashire line, a railway line between Preston and Colne
- East Lancashire Railway, a heritage railway line between Bury and Rawtenstall
- East Lancashire Railway 1844–1859, a 19th-century railway company
- A580, a major road colloquially known as the East Lancashire Road
