= Hurstwood =

Hamlet in Lancashire, England

Coordinates: 53.778°N 2.182°W

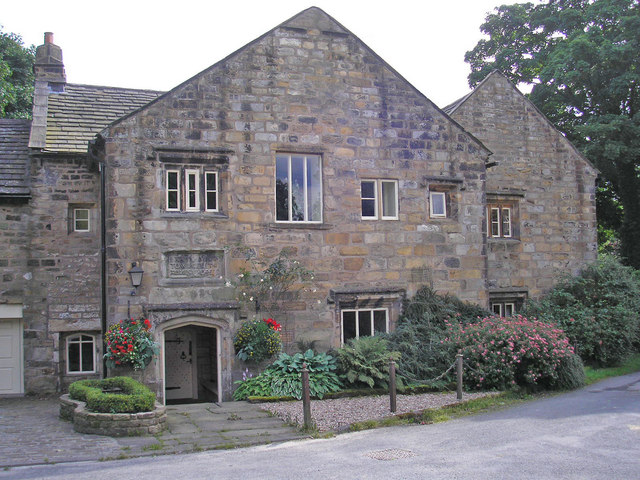
- Hurstwood Hall, built in 1579

- Shown within Burnley Borough Location within Lancashire
- OS grid reference: SD881313
- Civil parish: Worsthorne-with-Hurstwood
- District: Burnley
- Shire county: Lancashire
- Region: North West
- Country: England
- Sovereign state: United Kingdom
- Post town: BURNLEY
- Postcode district: BB10
- Dialling code: 01282
- Police: Lancashire
- Fire: Lancashire
- Ambulance: North West
- UK Parliament: Burnley

Hurstwood is a rural hamlet on the eastern outskirts of Burnley in Lancashire, England. It is in the civil parish of Worsthorne-with-Hurstwood and the borough of Burnley.

== History ==
The Old English word hyrst is thought to mean a wooded prominence, as 'wood' (OE wudu) has been appended, it may just mean a prominence in this case.

The older part of the settlement contains three buildings that are recorded in the National Heritage List for England as designated Grade II* listed buildings, being particularly important buildings of more than special interest. Hurstwood Hall, the Great Barn next to it, and Spencer House are all thought to have been constructed in late 16th century.

It is believed that the Elizabethan poet Edmund Spenser was part of the family that built Spenser House in Hurstwood. Scenes from the 1996 BBC adaptation of The Tenant of Wildfell Hall were filmed at Spenser House and Hurstwood Hall.

== Geography ==
To the east is Hurstwood reservoir, and south-east is Cant Clough reservoir, both are passed by the Mary Towneley Loop section of the Pennine Bridleway National Trail and the Burnley Way footpath. The River Brun is usually said to begin at the confluence of Hurstwood Brook and Rock Water at the edge of the hamlet.

== People ==
- Richard Tattersall (1724–1795), founder of racehorse auctioneers Tattersalls, was born here. Tattersalls Farm is next to Hurstwood Hall.

== Media gallery ==
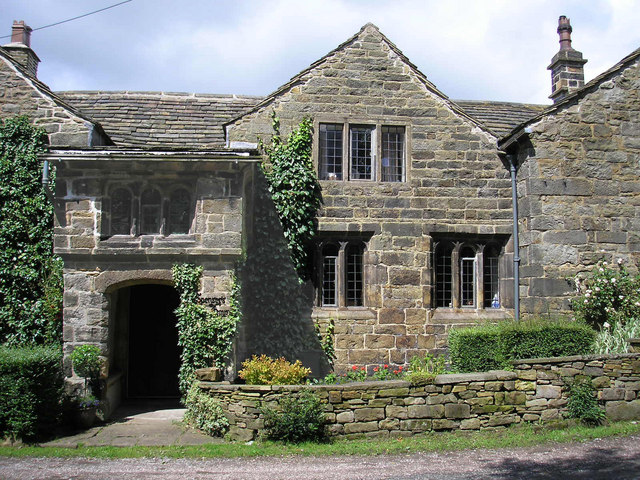
Spencer House.

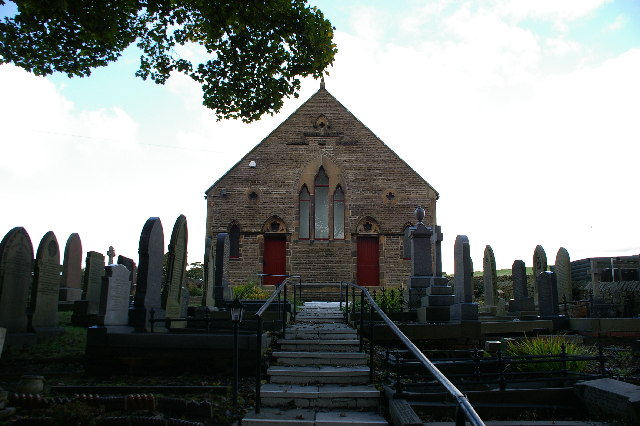
Hurstwood Church.

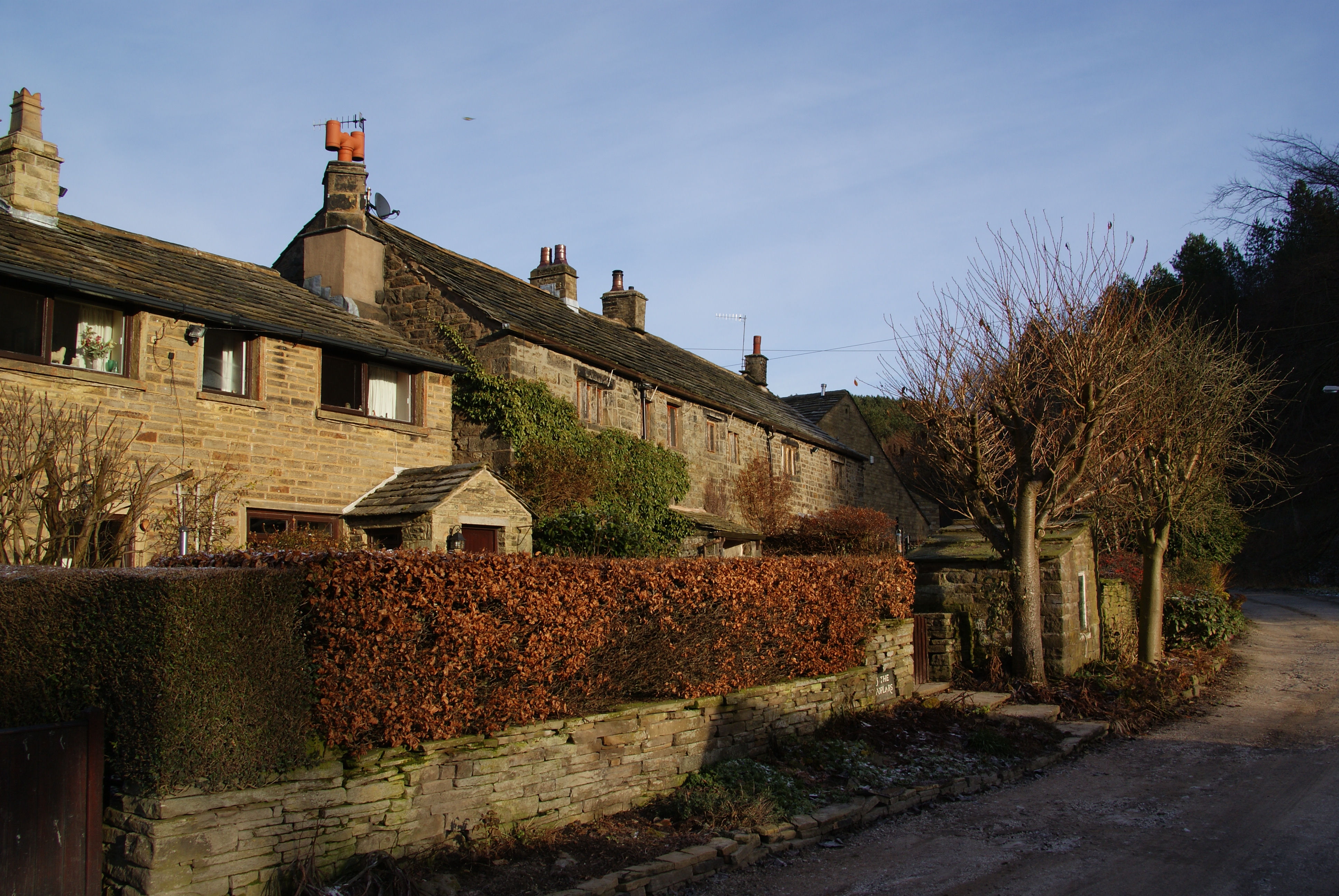
Rose Cottage and Brookside.

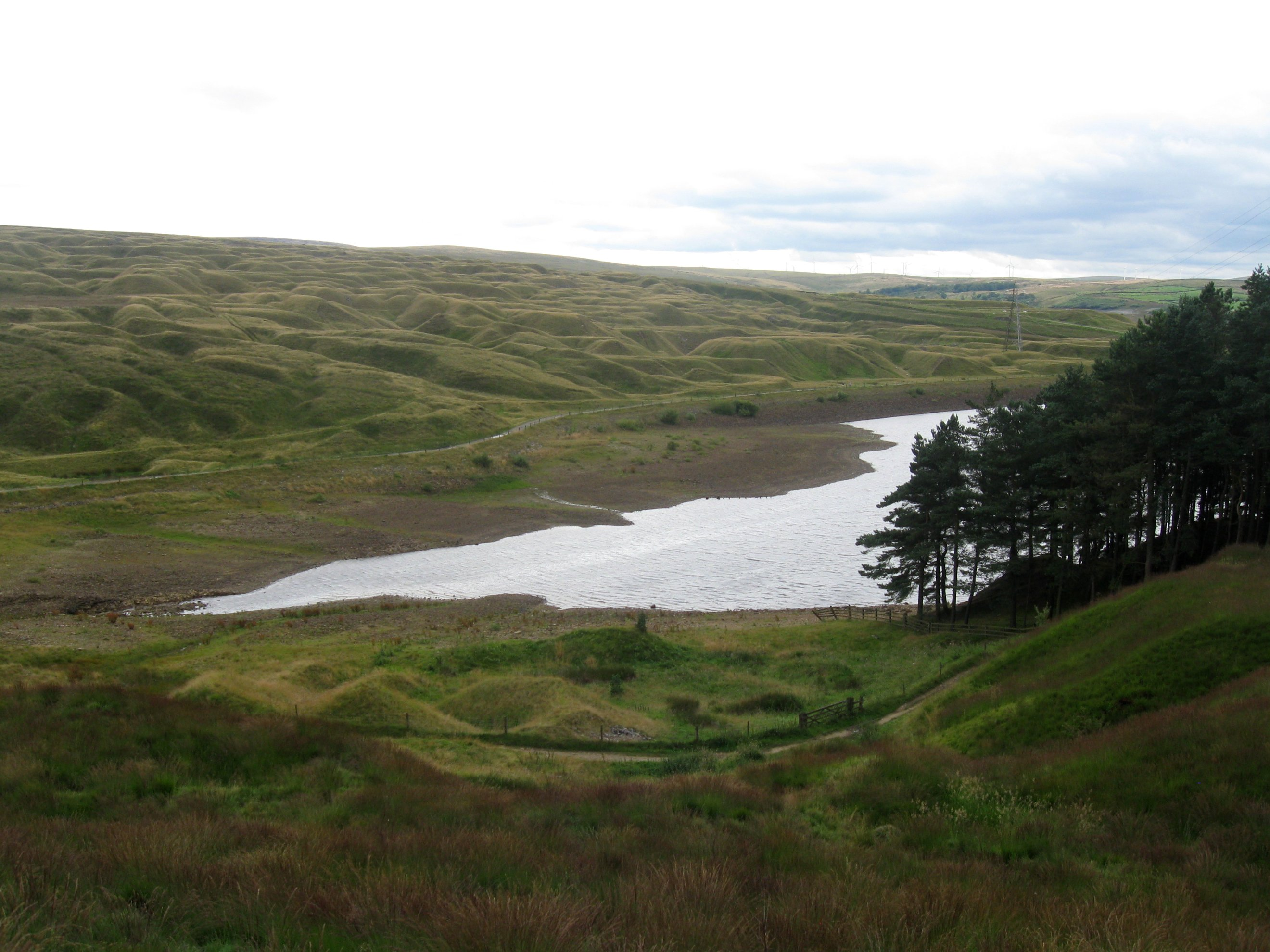
Hurstwood Reservoir and the remnants of Worsthorne Quarries.

== See also ==
- Listed buildings in Worsthorne-with-Hurstwood
