= Habergham Eaves =

Civil parish in Lancashire, England

Coordinates: 53.765°N 2.255°W

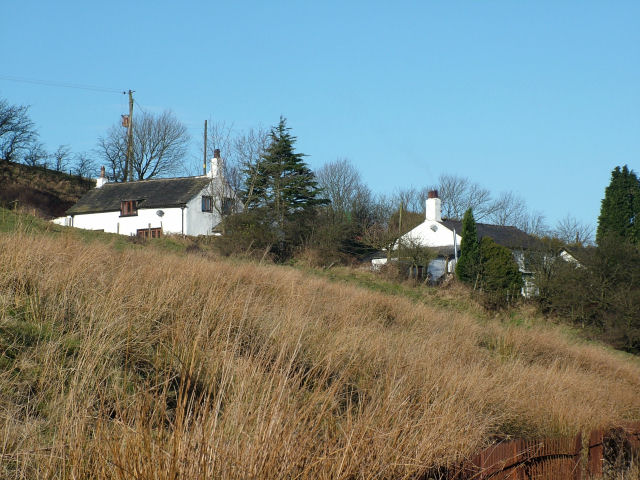
- Buildings at Higher Timber Hill Farm

- Shown within Burnley Borough Location within Lancashire
- Area: 2.87 sq mi (7.4 km^{2})
- Population: 1,466 (2011)
  - Density: 511/sq mi (197/km^{2})
- OS grid reference: SD8319229904
- Civil parish: Habergham Eaves
- District: Burnley
- Shire county: Lancashire
- Region: North West
- Country: England
- Sovereign state: United Kingdom
- Post town: BURNLEY
- Postcode district: BB11
- Dialling code: 01282
- Police: Lancashire
- Fire: Lancashire
- Ambulance: North West
- UK Parliament: Burnley

Habergham Eaves is a civil parish in the borough of Burnley, in Lancashire, England. The parish consists of a rural area south of Burnley, and suburban areas on the outskirts of the town, including a large industrial estate in the north-west corner of the parish. Habergham is also the name of an area west of Burnley, although it is no longer within the parish. According to the United Kingdom Census 2011, the parish has a population of 1,466.

The A646 Padiham to Todmorden road runs approximately along the northern boundary of the parish. Surrounding areas include the unparished areas of Burnley and Rossendale, and the parishes of Hapton, Dunnockshaw and Cliviger.

== History ==
Early forms of the name include "Habringham", with the third and second elements probably from the Old English words hām, meaning home and ing in this sense meaning "of the". Its first is less certain, possibly hēah with beorg meaning high hill or mountain—perhaps the origin of Horelaw, the name of the hill on which the parish is situated—or alternatively a personal name. The addition Eaves OE efes could mean "edge of a hill". There is also part of the parish called Oaken Eaves.

Habergham Eaves township historically extended further to the north from Gawthorpe Hall in the west to Towneley Hall in the east, the River Calder generally separating it from the neighbouring townships.

Now located in an isolated position in Cross Field near the former Bull and Butcher Inn is the base of a cross, thought to be a butter cross possibly of late medieval origin.

Considered part of the Burnley Coalfield, coal may have been mined here from the mid 15th century, but certainly by early 1500s. After Richard Towneley obtained a lease from the Crown to mine at Broadhead, he launched a legal action in the Duchy Court, complaining that on 7 May 1526 a group of about eighty of the king's tenants had entered the "coal beds" here to obtain coal for themselves. This group included Hugh Habergham and another Richard Towneley from the branch of the family at Royle Hall. The tenants claimed the right to "sufficient coal for their fuel, for their necessary occupation and burning within their houses". One witness said that around 1450 two men who had a smithy in Bentley Wood searched for iron at Broadhead and found coal and began mining it. With the son of one of them later setting-up a windlass.

The Towneleys where involved in another legal battle over land rights here in 1568. Local farmers alleged that half a century before Sir John Towneley had used forged documentation to create an enclosed area that had become known as Horelaw Pasture. A Duchy Special Commission subsequently found this to have been an encroachment and confiscated the approximately 400-acre (160 ha) area, situated directly south of another enclosure called Hollin Hey. However shortly after James I came to the English throne, the land was granted to the 1st Earl of Devonshire, and before 1612 another Richard Towneley, the great-grandson of Sir John, was able to reacquire it. This made Sir John so unpopular with the local people a tradition arose that his ghost wanders the hills calling "Be warned! Lay out! Be warned! Lay out! Around Horelaw and Hollin Hey Clough".

Crown Point Road was built as part of the first attempt by a Turnpike Trust to improve the journey between Burnley and Rochdale following an Act in 1754–55. From Bacup it connected to the existing roads at the junction of Cog Lane and what is now Rossendale Road. The Burnley and Edenfield Trust built the A682—formerly the A56—Manchester Road soon after 1795, crossing the other at the former Bull and Butcher Inn where a toll bar was situated. In 1817 the Rochdale and Burnley Trust commenced work on what is now the A671 Bacup/Todmorden Road, which forms part of the modern parish boundary (along with a branch through Cliviger to Todmorden). This was connected to Crown Point Road at Windy Bank in Cliviger, before continuing to Burnley at Turf Moor, greatly reducing the older road's importance.

In 1861 the Borough of Burnley was formed, and in 1894 a large part of the township, with a population of over 40,000 and including Rose Grove, Burnley Wood, Gannow and Habergham, was transferred to the County Borough of Burnley, and taken out of the control of the newly established Lancashire County Council. The remainder, with the exception of a small area transferred to Ightenhill, became the civil parish of Habergham Eaves.

In April 1941, during World War II a Starfish site bombing decoy was constructed off Crown Point Road, part of a network designed to protect Accrington. On 6 May 1941, a string of eight bombs straddled houses around Rossendale Avenue on the southern edge of Burnley, causing only minor damage. On the night of 12 October the Starfish site was targeted by the Luftwaffe and the control shelter suffered a direct hit. Aircraftsman L R Harwood was killed whilst Sergeant D A Murphy, Aircraftsman D R Fryatt, Aircraftsman J Owen, and Aircraftsman E A Jones were all injured as a result of enemy action. By the end of the year the sites were upgraded to incorporate Quick Light (QL) decoys, and they continued to operate until spring 1943, and the site was subsequently cleared.

=== Habergham Hall ===
Although most of the land in the township was held by copyhold of the manor of Ightenhill, a freehold estate, sometimes described as a manor, called Habergham existed here. The ancient Habergham Hall, of which there are now no remains, stood near the western side of the township, overlooking Habergham Clough, the boundary with Hapton. A family was already using the surname when the lord of Clitheroe, Roger de Lacy, who died in 1211, gave an oxgang of land here to Matthew de Habergham and his heirs. The estate descended in 1615 to John Habergham, then aged sixteen. After the English Civil War his descendants sold the estate in parts, George Halsted becoming the owner of the hall in 1689 as the result of the foreclosure of a mortgage. The present Habergham Hall farmhouse was built on the site in 1754, and later came into the possession of the branch of the Halstead family at Rowley Hall in Worsthorne-with-Hurstwood, who sold it in the mid-1800s.

== Governance ==
Habergham Eaves was once a township in the ancient parish of Whalley. This became a civil parish in 1866, forming part of the Burnley Rural District from 1894. Since 1974 Habergham Eaves has formed part of the Borough of Burnley. A boundary change which took effect at the start of 1983, transferred a small part of parish lying west of Limey Lane into Dunnockshaw.

Along with Dunnockshaw and a small part of Burnley, the parish forms the Coalclough with Deerplay ward of the borough council. The ward elects three councillors, currently Gordon Birtwistle, Howard Baker, and Jacqueline Inckle of the Liberal Democrats. The parish is represented on Lancashire County Council as part of the Padiham & Burnley West division, represented since 2017 by Alan Hosker (Conservative).

The Member of Parliament for Burnley, the constituency into which the parish falls, is Oliver Ryan of the Labour Party, who was first elected in 2024.

== Demography ==
According to the United Kingdom Census 2011, the parish has a population of 1,466, a decrease from 1,581 in the 2001 census. This represents a decline of 7.8% over ten years. The parish has an area of 744 hectares (2.87 sq mi; 7.44 km^{2}), giving a population density of 1.97 inhabitants per hectare (510/sq mi; 197/km^{2}). The developed parts of the parish were included in the Burnley Built-up area, defined in the 2011 census which had a population of 149,422.

In 2011 the average (mean) age of residents was 43.4 years, with a roughly even distribution between males and females. The racial composition was 98.4% White (96.6% White British), 1.2% Asian, 0.1% Black and 0.3% Mixed. The largest religious groups were Christian (79.1%), Hindu (0.5%) and Muslim (0.3%). 69.4% of adults between the ages of 16 and 74 were classed as economically active and in work.

Population of Habergham Eaves parish over time
Year	1891	1901	1911	1921	1931	1951	1961	2001	2011
Population	46,930	396	459	322	424	756	726	1,581	1,466

== Media gallery ==
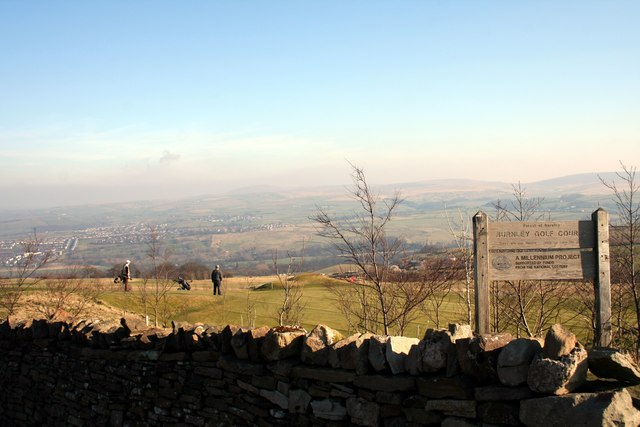
Burnley Golf Club

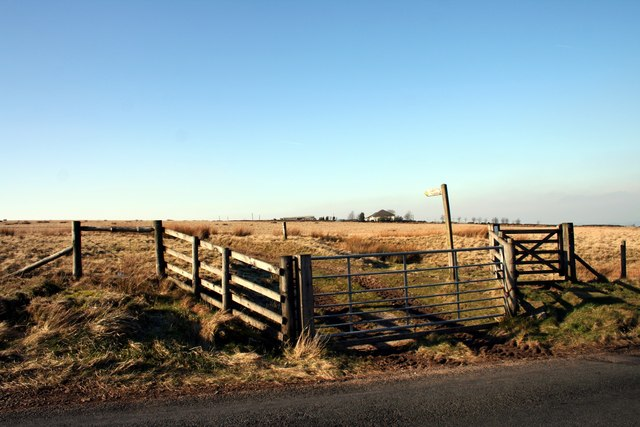
view from Crown Point Road

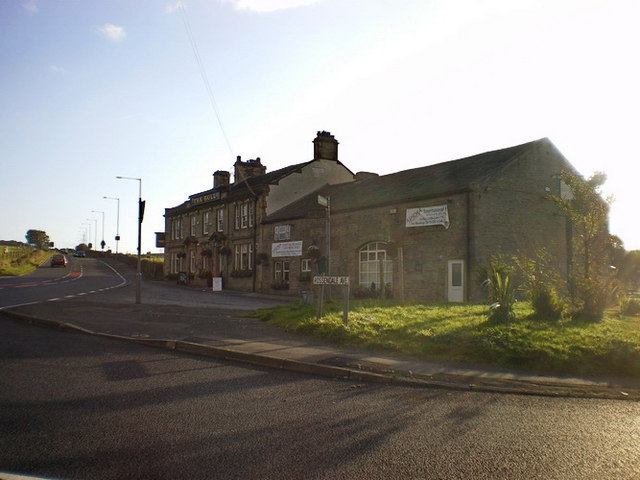
The Bull on Manchester Road

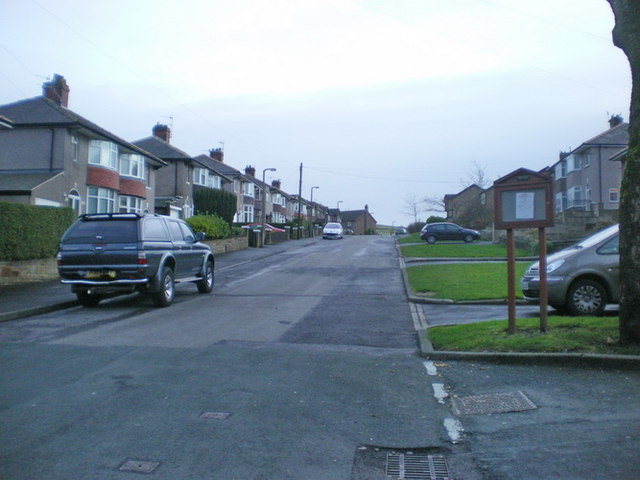
Burnley's suburbs have continued to encroach

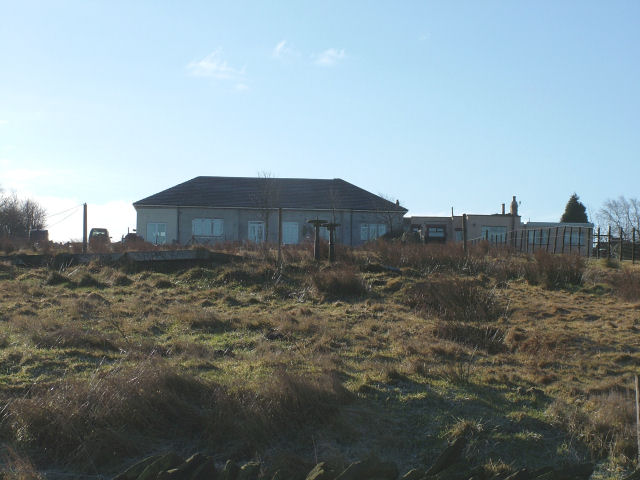
Crown Point House

== See also ==
- Listed buildings in Habergham Eaves
- St Matthew's Church, Habergham Eaves
