= Pendle Way =

Long-distance footpath in Lancashire, England

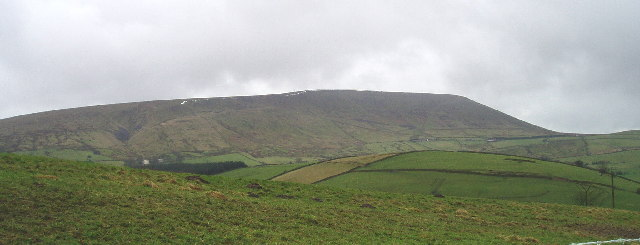
- Pendle Hill
- Length: 45 mi (72 km)
- Location: Lancashire, England
- Trailheads: Circular based in the Borough of Pendle
- Use: Hiking

The Pendle Way is a recreational path in the South Pennines of England, which encircles the borough of Pendle; it was officially opened in 1987. The circuit is 45 miles (72 km) in length and, according to the Long Distance Walkers Association, involves 1839 m (6033 ft) ascent reaching 557 m (1,827 ft) maximum height. Its attractions include historical associations with the seventeenth century Pendle Witches, connections with the Brontës, stonebuilt villages in the traditional style of East Lancashire and the South Pennines, relics of the weaving and lead mining industry, and limestone meadows and millstone grit moorland culminating in the ascent of Pendle Hill.

== Route ==
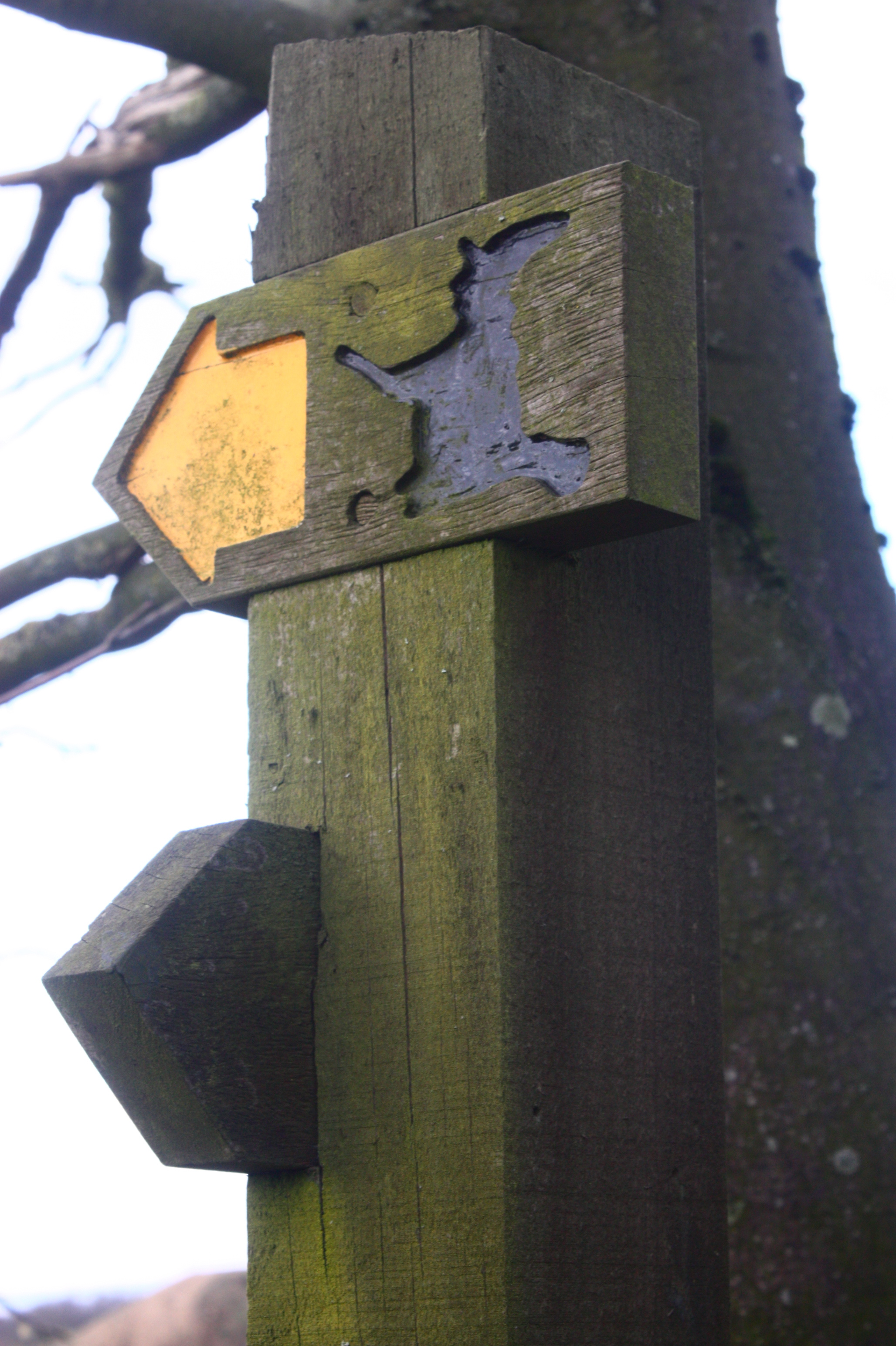
Pendle Way Waymark

The walk was assembled by designating sections of pre-existing right-of-way as the Recreational Path. Since it is a circular walk, the path may be started at any point. However, conventionally, the route proceeds clockwise and starts Barley or at the Pendle Heritage Centre in Barrowford, culminating in the ascent of Pendle Hill. From Barrowford it follows riverside and moorland paths for 7 miles (11 km) to reach Barnoldswick. From Barnoldswick 5.5 miles (9 km) partly alongside the Leeds and Liverpool Canal the path proceeds via Thornton-in-Craven to Earby. From Earby the path proceeds 7 miles (11 km) via Kelbrook to Laneshawbridge. From Laneshawbridge the path proceeds 6.5 miles (10.5 km) via Wycoller and along an old packhorse route over the moors above Trawden to the Coldwell Inn. From there the path proceeds 4.5 miles (7.2 km) through farmland to Reedley and then 6 miles (9.5 km) via Higham to Newchurch. The next section of 5 miles (8 km) includes the ascent of Pendle Hill and descent to Barley followed by 3.5 miles (5.5 km) back to Barrowford.

== Walking the Pendle Way ==
Guides to the route typically divide the walk into 4-8 sections, although as a challenge it can be walked in a single day. Since there are many points at which the path crosses the routes of buses serving Nelson or Colne bus stations, consecutive sections of the walk can easily be accessed by public transport. There are cafes or pubs serving food on most sections of the path. In addition to a guidebook, and the section guides issued by the borough of Pendle, the walk is mapped in the Ordnance Survey 1:25000 map of the South Pennines. The route is waymarked with wooden chevrons bearing a distinctive logo of a black silhouette of a witch (with a pointy hat and riding a broomstick) on a yellow background, and by carved stones on Pendle Hill.

== See also ==
- Brontë Way
- Burnley Way
