= Priscilla Reyntiens =

British politician (1899–1991)

Priscilla Cecilia Maria Reyntiens, The Lady Norman, CBE, JP (20 March 1899 – 5 April 1991) was a London councillor, board member, and supporter of mental health and nursing institutions.

Her father Major Robert Reyntiens was Aide de Camp to King Leopold II of Belgium, whilst her mother Lady Alice Josephine Bertie was the daughter of the 7th Earl of Abingdon. In 1921, Reyntiens married Colonel Alexander Koch de Gooreynd of the Irish Guards, who adopted the anglicized name of 'Worsthorne'. She had two sons with de Gooreynd, but the marriage was dissolved in 1929. In 1933 she married again to Montagu Collet Norman, governor of the Bank of England. Priscilla was also known as the Lady Norman St Clere, after the country house her husband inherited.

As a councillor, she served on both the London County Council and Chelsea Borough Council. She was a founder member and, from 1938 to 1941, vice-chairman of the Women’s Voluntary Services for Civil Defence. Reyntiens was board member for the Maudsley Hospital in Camberwell, vice-president of the Royal College of Nursing, and honorary president of the World Federation of Mental Health. She became a JP in 1944.

She was made CBE in 1963.

Her younger son, Peregrine Worsthorne, was editor of the Sunday Telegraph from 1986 to 1989. Her elder son was Simon Towneley.
