= Simon Towneley =

British author (1921–2022)

Sir Simon Towneley KCVO KCSG JP
- Born: Simon Peter Edmund Cosmo William Koch de Gooreynd; 14 December 1921; St George Hanover Square, London, England
- Died: 11 November 2022 (aged 100); Cliviger, Lancashire, England
- Education: Worcester College, Oxford
- Occupation: Author
- Spouse: Lady Mary Fitzherbert (died 2001)
- Children: 7, including K. M. Grant and Cosima Towneley
- Mother: Priscilla Reyntiens
- Family: Sir Peregrine Worsthorne (brother)

Sir Simon Peter Edmund Cosmo William Towneley KCVO KCSG JP (né Koch de Gooreynd; 14 December 1921 – 11 November 2022) was a British author who served as Lord Lieutenant of Lancashire from 1976 to 1997.

== Early life and education ==
Towneley was born in St George Hanover Square, London, on 14 December 1921, as the elder son of a British father of Belgian stock, Alexander Louis Wynand Koch de Gooreynd, and a British-Belgian mother, Priscilla Reyntiens. His mother was the daughter of Lady Alice Josephine, second daughter of Montagu Bertie, 7th Earl of Abingdon, and Maj. Robert Reyntiens, a member of the International Olympic Committee. His mother was asked to give birth as quietly as possible, as Ignacy Jan Paderewski was downstairs giving a piano recital at the time.

The family name was changed to Worsthorne when his father attempted to enter British politics, but his parents divorced soon after. His younger brother was Sir Peregrine Worsthorne, the journalist.

Priscilla Reyntiens remarried to Montagu Norman, 1st Baron Norman in January 1933, and the brothers spent their teenage years at his house in Campden Hill. They were brought up as Roman Catholics, but did not attend denominational schools. He was educated at Stowe School and Worcester College, Oxford. His education was interrupted by the Second World War, and he returned to Worcester afterward to complete a music doctorate.

He later changed his surname to Towneley Worsthorne and finally Towneley by deed poll, on 28 May 1955.

== Career ==
During the Second World War, Worsthorne served in the King's Royal Rifle Corps, receiving a commission as a second lieutenant in December 1942. Early in 1944, he was captured near the Garigliano river in Italy and spent the remainder of the war as a PoW.

From 1949 until 1955, he lectured in the history of music at Worcester College. In 1954 (under the name Simon Towneley Worsthorne) he published Venetian Opera in the 17th Century, a seminal study of the field, which played a significant role in the remarkable revival of the Venetian opera repertory in the latter 20th century.

In Towneley's youth, Dyneley Hall in Cliviger (near Burnley), Lancashire, had been the home of his grandmother (Alice Reyntiens), but in 1952 he inherited it along with a landholding known as the Worsthorne Estate. This is a portion of the Towneley Estate that was divided between the three daughters of Charles Towneley in 1885. However it is not the part inherited by Towneley's great-grandmother. The Worsthorne Estate was inherited by Towneley's grandmother, in 1921, from her cousin Cosmo Gordon-Lennox.

He was a Lancashire County Councillor between 1961 and 1964.

Between 1969 and 1986, Towneley was the first chairman of the board at the Northern Ballet Theatre. And he was also a director of Granada Television from 1981 until 1992. He was also an important figure in the establishment of the Royal Northern College of Music in 1972, and remained a governor there for many years.

== Appointments ==
Towneley was a Justice of the peace for Lancashire from 1956. He was appointed High Sheriff of Lancashire for 1971 and Lord Lieutenant of Lancashire from 1976 to 1996. He was appointed Honorary Colonel of the Duke of Lancaster's Own Yeomanry from 1979 to 1988. He was a member of the Council of the Duchy of Lancaster between 1986 and 1996. He was a trustee of the British Museum from 1988 until 1993. Towneley was elected as a member of the Roxburghe Club in 1992. He was also a trustee of the Historic Churches Preservation Trust and a member of the council of the University of Manchester.

== Honours ==
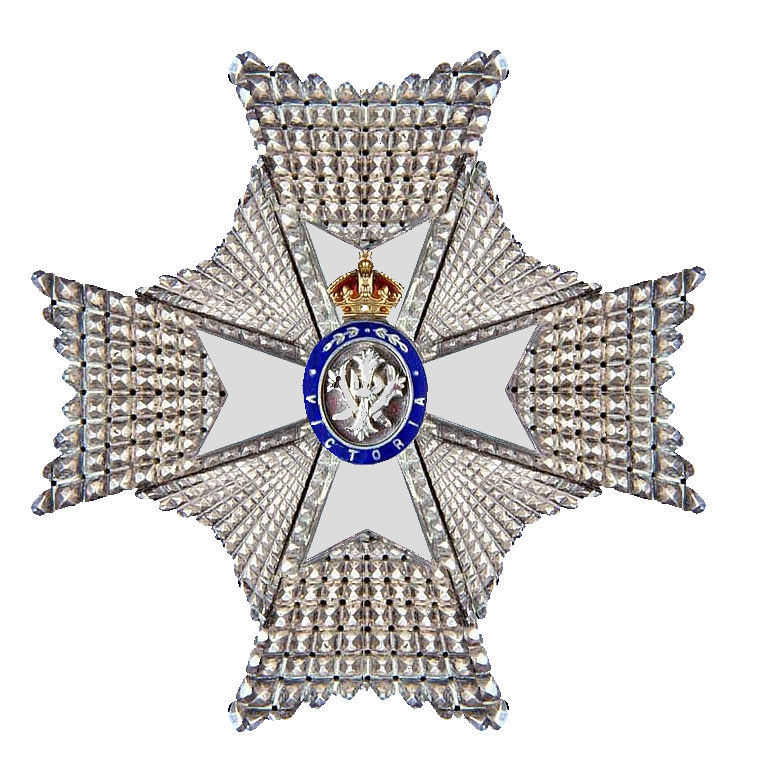
The insignia of a KCVO

Towneley was appointed a Knight of the Order of Saint John in October 1976. He was made a Knight Commander of the Royal Victorian Order in the 1994 New Year Honours.

He was also awarded the Catholic honour of being appointed a Knight Commander of the Order of St. Gregory the Great.

In 1990, Towneley was only the fifth person to be awarded a companionship of the Royal Northern College of Music.

== Personal life ==
Towneley married his second cousin Mary Fitzherbert, the third of six children of Cuthbert Fitzherbert, from a well-off recusant English Roman Catholic family. She was a keen endurance equestrian, repeating Dick Turpin's ride from London to York and opening up what became known as the Mary Towneley Loop on the Pennine Bridleway.

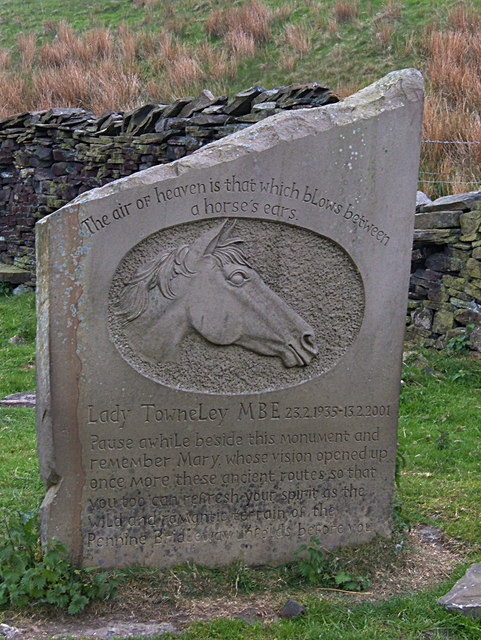
Monument to Lady Mary Towneley on the route of Mary Towneley Loop in Cliviger.

The couple had seven children; one son and six daughters:

- Alice Mary Towneley, born 1956, married Michael O'Neill in 1986.
- Charlotte Mary Towneley, born 1957, married Arthur French in 1986.
- Katharine Mary Towneley, born 1958, married William Grant in 1985, writer.
- Peregrine Henry Towneley, born 1962, married Sarah Trimble Macleod in 1998.
- Victoria Mary Towneley, born 1964, married Edward Bowen-Jones in 1992.
- Cosima Cecilia Towneley, born 1967, Lancashire County Councillor.
- Frances Teresa Towneley, born 1969, married Daniel Scoular in 1997.

At Dyneley, the couple employed George Pace to design an extension to the hall, which included the creation of a tiny oratory, reputedly the smallest in the country. Each Sunday for many years, a Jesuit priest wearing pre-Reformation vestments thought to have come from Whalley Abbey, would say Mass in it. A long-time member of the International Dendrology Society, Towneley supported many local horticultural projects and created an impressive garden at the hall.

Lady Towneley died in 2001 from cancer, at the age of 65.

== Death ==
Towneley died on 11 November 2022, at the age of 100 at Dyneley Hall in Cliviger.

Honorary titles
Preceded by The Lord Clitheroe	Lord Lieutenant of Lancashire; 1976–1997	Succeeded by The Lord Shuttleworth
