= East Lancashire Primary Care Trust =

UK NHS primary care trust

East Lancashire Primary Care Trust (East Lancashire PCT) was a large local NHS organisation.

The primary care trust commissioned services as well as provides health services and was part of the strategic health authority for the North West. It was abolished in April 2013.
