= Mary Towneley Loop =

47-mile circular footpath in north England

Coordinates: 53.704°N 1.233°W

The Mary Towneley Loop is a 47-mile (76 km) circular route that forms part of the Pennine Bridleway National Trail, along the borders of Lancashire and Yorkshire. The loop was opened in 2002, the first section of the Pennine Bridleway.

It is named in memory of Mary, Lady Towneley, who drew attention to the poor state of England's bridleways and the need for a long-distance route for horse-riders by riding with two friends in September 1986 from Hexham in Northumberland to Ashbourne in Derbyshire. She died in 2001.

The route joins the main Pennine Bridleway at two points, one near the village of Summit between Littleborough and Todmorden, and one just east of Worsthorne. Heading west from Summit the Loop climbs to Top of Leach at 474 metres (1,555 ft). The trail then passes through the town of Waterfoot in the Rossendale Valley and follows new tracks via Lumb before entering the Cliviger Gorge and then climbing up to the Long Causeway. It then heads north to rejoin the main Pennine Bridleway just east of Worsthorne. The Loop then follows the main route to enter West Yorkshire at Widdop, crosses Heptonstall Moor and drops down to cross the Calder Valley just west of the town of Hebden Bridge. The trail passes the villages of Mankinholes and Bottomley to return to Summit.

An annual relay race, organized by Rossendale Harriers, took place in late January or early February until 2011. Teams consisting of five pairs of runners race over five relay legs completed the entire 47 miles and 6,400 feet of ascent of the loop, clockwise from Fearns Sports College in Stacksteads. The last race in 2011 took place on 30 January and hosted 109 teams, 1,090 individual runners from clubs across the north of England, and was won by Salford Harriers.
