= List of ecclesiastical works by Lewis Vulliamy =

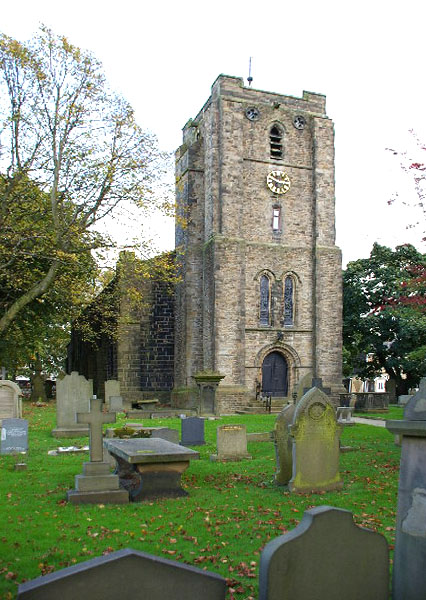
St John the Evangelist's Church, Worsthorne

Lewis Vulliamy (1791–1871) was an English architect who is best known for his work on large houses. He was born in Pall Mall, London, into a family of clock and watchmakers. At the age of 16 he was articled to the architect Robert Smirke, and from 1809 he studied at the Royal Academy Schools where he won the silver and gold medals. In 1818 he was awarded a scholarship from the academy, allowing him to study for four years on the continent where he spent most of the time in Italy.

On his return to England, Vulliamy established his practice in Oxford Street, London. His first commission was for work on Syston Park in Lincolnshire for Sir John Hayford Thorold. Following the Church Building Acts of 1818 and 1824, he became involved with the Church Commissioners, designing, with others, a series of churches that have become to be known as Commissioners' churches. Vulliamy designed at least 14 churches for the Commissioners. He also designed a variety of public buildings, including a grandstand at Wolverhampton Racecourse, the Lock Hospital in Paddington, new premises for The Law Society in London, and the re-fronting of the premises of the Royal Institution, also in London.

Vulliamy's best known works were on large country and town houses. In addition to his work on Syston Park, he designed other country houses, including Boothby Hall, Lincolnshire. His major patron was Robert Stayner Holford, for whom he carried out work on Westonbirt House in Gloucestershire, and also designed his London residence, Dorchester House in Park Lane. These two houses are considered to be Vulliamy's most important works. Vulliamy published two works: The Bridge of the SSa. Trinita, over the Arno at Florence (1822), and Examples of ornamental sculpture in architecture (1823). For several years he suffered from chronic bronchitis, and he died at his home on Clapham Common in 1871. His estate was valued at about £60,000 (equivalent to £7,060,000 in 2023).

This list contains details of Vulliamy's work on churches and other ecclesiastical structures.

== Key ==
Grade	Criteria
Grade I	Buildings of exceptional interest, sometimes considered to be internationally important.
Grade II*	Particularly important buildings of more than special interest.
Grade II	Buildings of national importance and special interest.
"—" denotes a work that is not graded.

== Works ==
Name	Location	Photograph	Date	Notes	Grade
St Barnabas' Church	Kensington, Greater London; 51.4991°N 0.2063°W		1827	A Commissioners' church.	II
St Bartholomew's Church	Sydenham, Lewisham, Greater London; 51.4279°N 0.0581°W		1827–32	A Commissioners' church.	II*
St Paul's Church	Burslem, Staffordshire		1828–29	A Commissioners' church. Since demolished.	
Holy Trinity Church	Wordsley, West Midlands; 52.4797°N 2.1601°W		1829–31	A Commissioners' church.	II
St Michael's Church	Highgate, Camden, Greater London; 51.5689°N 0.1503°W		1830–32	A Commissioners' church.	II*
Christ Church	Woburn Square, Bloomsbury, Camden, Greater London		1830–31	A Commissioners' church. Since demolished.	
St John's Church	Richmond, Greater London; 51.4642°N 0.3004°W		1831–36	A Commissioners' church.	II
Christ Church	Todmorden, West Yorkshire; 53.7162°N 2.1001°W		1832	A Commissioners' church.	II
St John the Baptist's Church	Smallbridge, Rochdale, Greater Manchester; 53.6338°N 2.1320°W		1834	A Commissioners' church.	II
St John the Evangelist's Church	Worsthorne, Lancashire; 53.7878°N 2.1892°W		1834–35		II
St Clement's Church	Spotland, Rochdale, Greater Manchester; 53.6213°N 2.1771°W		1835	A Commissioners' church.	II
Holy Trinity Church	Burnley, Lancashire; 53.7897°N 2.2571°W		1835–36	A Commissioners' church, damaged by fire about 1991, later converted for residential use.	II
St Mary and St Laurence's Church	Rosedale, North Yorkshire; 54.3538°N 0.8877°W		1839	A new church replacing a 14th-century priory.	II
Christ Church	Cobridge, Stoke-on-Trent, Staffordshire; 53.0354°N 2.1870°W		1839–40		II
Church of St Remigus	Roydon, Norfolk; 52.3813°N 1.07838°E		1840	Added south porch.	I
St Nicholas' Church	Winterborne Clenston, Dorset; 50.8245°N 2.2288°W		1840		II*
St Giles' Church	Knowle St Giles, Somerset; 50.8974°N 2.9243°W		c. 1840	Rebuilt the nave. Later converted into a house.	II
Rochester Cathedral	Rochester, Kent; 51.3890°N 0.5033°E		1840s	Alterations.	I
St Peter's Church	Bethnal Green, Tower Hamlets, Greater London; 51.5302°N 0.0646°W		1840–41	A Commissioners' church.	II
St James-the-Less	Bethnal Green, Tower Hamlets, Greater London; 51.5318°N 0.0479°W		1840–42	A Commissioners' church, damaged in the Second World War.	II
St Peter and St Paul's Church	Chingford, Waltham Forest, Greater London; 51.6312°N 0.0011°E		1844		II*
St James' Church	Kensington, Greater London; 51.5083°N 0.2132°E		1844–45	A Commissioners' church.	II
All Saints Church	Ennismore Gardens, Westminster, Greater London; 51.5006°N 0.1691°W		1848–49	A Commissioners' church. Later the Russian Orthodox Patriarchal Church of The Assumption.	II*
Church of St James the Great	Thorley, Hertfordshire; 51.8487°N 0.1415°E		1854–55	Restoration	I
St Mary's Church	Lasborough, Gloucestershire; 51.6457°N 2.2588°W		1861–62	Replacement of a medieval church.	II

== See also ==
- List of works by Lewis Vulliamy on large houses
- List of miscellaneous works by Lewis Vulliamy
