= List of works by Lewis Vulliamy on large houses =

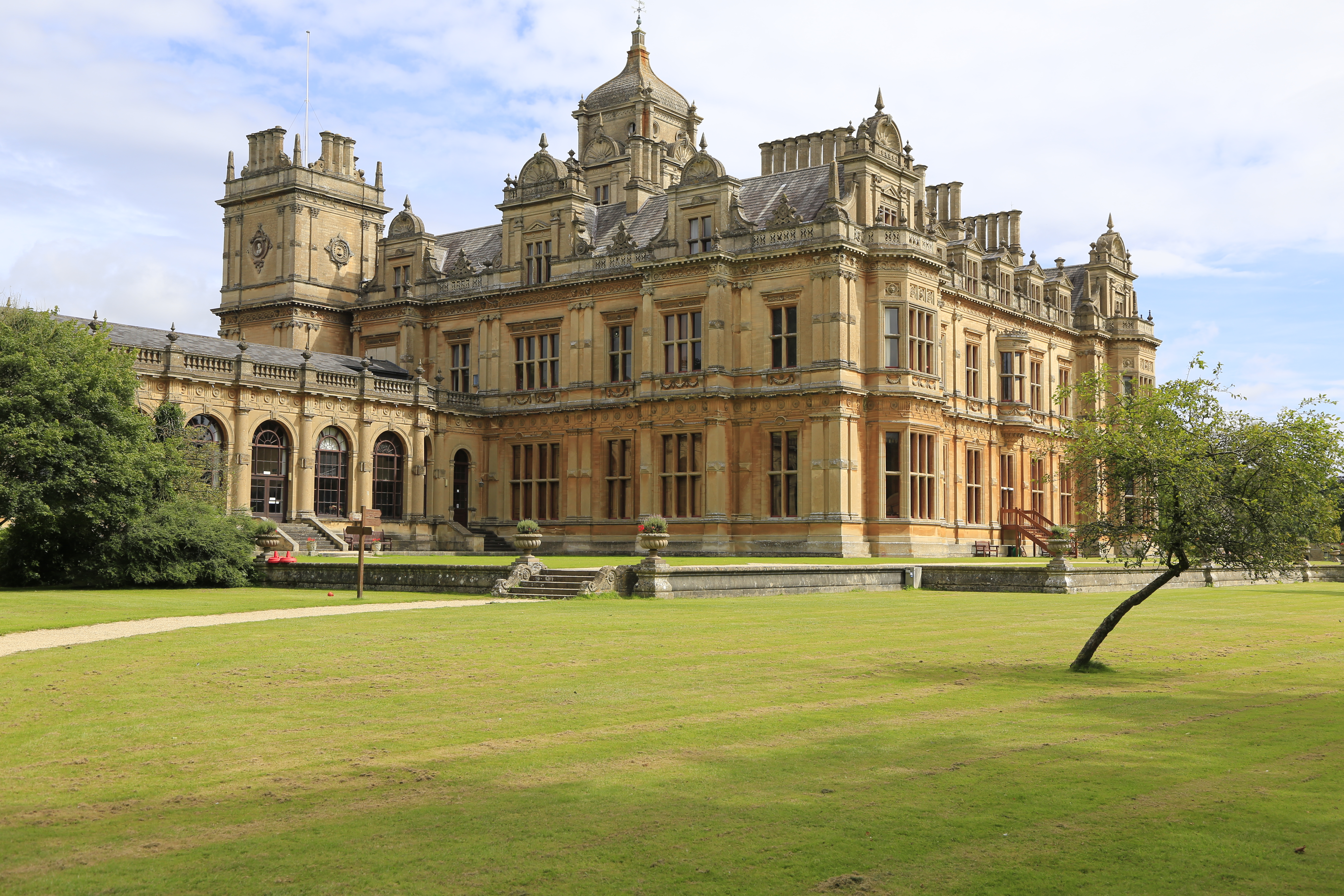
Westonbirt House in Gloucestershire

Lewis Vulliamy (1791–1871) was an English architect who is best known for his work on large houses. He was born in Pall Mall, London, into a family of clock and watchmakers. At the age of 16 he was articled to the architect Robert Smirke, and from 1809 he studied at the Royal Academy Schools where he won the silver and gold medals. In 1818 he was awarded a scholarship from the academy, allowing him to study for four years on the continent where he spent most of the time in Italy.

On his return to England, Vulliamy established his practice in Oxford Street, London. His first commission was for work on Syston Park in Lincolnshire for Sir John Hayford Thorold, Bt. Following the Church Building Acts of 1818 and 1824, he became involved with the Church Commissioners, designing, with others, a series of churches that have become to be known as Commissioners' churches. Vulliamy designed at least 14 churches for the Commissioners. He also designed a variety of public buildings, including a grandstand at Wolverhampton Racecourse, the Lock Hospital in Paddington, new premises for The Law Society in London, and the re-fronting of the premises of the Royal Institution, also in London.

Vulliamy's best known works were on large country and town houses. In addition to his work on Syston Park, he designed other country houses, including Boothby Hall, Lincolnshire. His major patron was Robert Stayner Holford, for whom he carried out work on Westonbirt House in Gloucestershire, and also designed his London residence, Dorchester House in Park Lane. These two houses are considered to be Vulliamy's most important works. Vulliamy published two works: The Bridge of the SSa. Trinita, over the Arno at Florence (1822), and Examples of ornamental sculpture in architecture (1823). For several years he suffered from chronic bronchitis, and he died at his home on Clapham Common in 1871. His estate was valued at about £60,000 (equivalent to £7,060,000 in 2023).

This list contains details on Vulliamy's work on large houses.

== Key ==
Grade	Criteria
Grade I	Buildings of exceptional interest, sometimes considered to be internationally important.
Grade II*	Particularly important buildings of more than special interest.
Grade II	Buildings of national importance and special interest.
"—" denotes a work that is not graded.

== Works ==
Name	Location	Photograph	Date	Notes	Grade
Syston Park	Syston, Lincolnshire; 52.9535°N 0.6095°W		1815	Repair and enlargement of the house. In 1822–24 he added a library wing. The house was demolished in 1923.	
Boothby Hall	Boothby Pagnell, Lincolnshire; 52.8649°N 0.5593°W		c. 1824	Rebuilding of a country house dating from about 1630.	II
Leadenham House	Leadenham, Lincolnshire; 53.0551°N 0.5851°W		1826–29	Additions made to a house dating from the late 18th century.	II*
Bloxholm Hall	Bloxholm, Lincolnshire; 53.0714°N 0.4139°W		1827	Additions made to a country house dating from 1707. Most of it was demolished in the 1960s, leaving the west wing and stables.	II
Norton Place	Bishop Norton, Lincolnshire; 53.4057°N 0.5393°W		c. 1830	Alterations to a house dating from 1776 for Sir Montagu Cholmeley.	I
Twyford House	Thorley, Hertfordshire; 51.8524°N 0.1667°E		1835	Alterations.	II*
Friday Hill House	Friday Hill, Chingford, Waltham Forest, Greater London; 51.6237°N 0.0070°E		1839	A house for R G Heathcote.	II
Dingestow Court	Dingestow, Monmouthshire, Wales; 51.7834°N 2.7978°W		1845–46	South front added for John Bosanquet.	II*
Tregothnan	St Michael Penkevil, Cornwall; 50.2353°N 5.0057°W		1845–48	Additional building to a house dating from 1650.	I
Chestal House	Cam, Gloucestershire; 51.6823°N 2.3430°W		1848	A large country house for James Phelps.	II
Dorchester House	Park Lane, Westminster, Greater London; 51.5072°N 0.1525°W		1853–57	Built as a town house for Robert Stayner Holford. Demolished 1929 and replaced by the Dorchester Hotel.	
Shernfold Park	Frant, East Sussex; 51.0913°N 0.2700°E		1855	A country house for P. Ashburnham.	II
Highnam Court	Highnam, Gloucestershire; 51.8721°N 2.3013°W		1855	A house dating from the 17th century, altered for Thomas Gambier Parry.	I
Seaham Hall	Seaham, County Durham; 54.8481°N 1.3463°W		1861	Additions made to a house dating from the late 18th century for Frances, Lady Londonderry. Later a hotel.	II
Westonbirt House	Westonbirt, Gloucestershire; 51.6052°N 2.1976°W		1863–70	A large country house for Robert Stayner Holford. As of 2012 it is part of Westonbirt School. The ha-ha, a sundial, and a statue of Mercury, were also designed by Vulliamy.	I

== See also ==
- List of ecclesiastical works by Lewis Vulliamy
- List of miscellaneous works by Lewis Vulliamy
