= St Dingat's Church, Dingestow =

Church of St Dingat
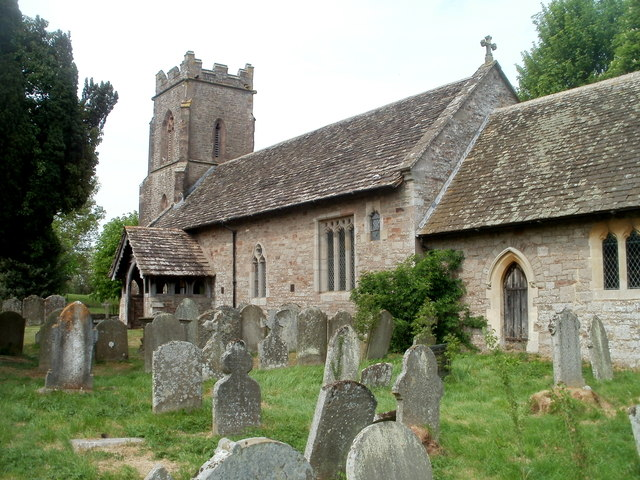
- "the principal architectural feature in Dingestow"

- Location in Monmouthshire
- 51.7897°N 2.7884°W
- Location: Dingestow, Monmouthshire
- Country: Wales
- Denomination: Church in Wales

History
- Status: parish church
- Founded: 14th century

Architecture
- Functional status: Active
- Heritage designation: Grade II*
- Designated: 27 November 1953
- Architect(s): Thomas Henry Wyatt, Richard Creed
- Architectural type: Church

Administration
- Diocese: Monmouth
- Archdeaconry: Monmouth
- Deanery: Monmouth
- Parish: Dingestow

Clergy
- Priest: The Reverend G. J. R. Williams

The Church of St Dingat in Dingestow, Monmouthshire, Wales, is a parish church dating from the 14th century. It is dedicated to Saint Dingat or Dingad, a 5th-century Welsh saint. The church was almost completely rebuilt by Thomas Henry Wyatt in 1846 and further renovated by Richard Creed in 1887–1888. It is an active parish church and a Grade II* listed building.

== History ==
The origins of the church date from the 14th century, though almost nothing remains of this period. In the early 19th century, the Monmouthshire antiquarian Charles Heath described the original church, "it is a mean building and has nothing to attract the eye of curiosity, consisting only of a nave without side-isles". The tower was rebuilt in 1846 by the architect T. H. Wyatt, who worked extensively in Monmouthshire. Later in the 19th century further renovations took place under the supervision of Richard Creed. The church remains an active parish church.

== Architecture and description ==
The church is built of sandstone and puddingstone rubble. It comprises a nave with porch, a North transept, a chancel and Wyatt's tower.

The architectural historian John Newman describes the stained glass as comprising roundels depicting the Lamb of God and symbols of the Four Evangelists. The North transept functions as the chapel of the Bosanquet family of Dingestow Court and contains memorials to members of the family dating from 1806 to 1975.

The church is a Grade II* listed building, its listing recording the building as "the principal architectural feature in the village of Dingestow".
