= Listed buildings in Worsthorne-with-Hurstwood =

Worsthorne-with-Hurstwood is a civil parish in the borough of Burnley, Lancashire, England. The parish contains 22 buildings that are recorded in the National Heritage List for England as designated listed buildings. Of these, four are listed at Grade II*, the middle grade, and the others are at Grade II, the lowest grade. Apart from the village of Worsthorne and the settlement of Hurstwood, the parish is rural. Most of the listed buildings are farmhouses, or originated as farmhouses or farm buildings. Other listed buildings include large houses and associated structures, a row of former back-to-back cottages, a church, and a telephone kiosk.

== Key ==
Grade	Criteria
II*	Particularly important buildings of more than special interest
II	Buildings of national importance and special interest

== Buildings ==
Name and location	Photograph	Date	Notes	Grade
Spencer House, Hurstwood; 53.77829°N 2.18220°W		Mid 16th century (probable)	Originally a farmhouse, it is in sandstone with stone-slate roofs, and has two storeys. The house has an H-shaped plan consisting of a hall and two-bay cross-wings. Some of the windows are mullioned, and other openings have been altered.	II*
Great Barn, Hurstwood; 53.77846°N 2.18139°W		Late 16th century (probable)	An aisled sandstone barn with stone slate roofs. It has six bays, and contains opposed wagon entrances, a mullioned window, ventilation slits, and other inserted openings.	II*
Ivy Cottage, Hurstwood; 53.77816°N 2.18237°W		Late 16th century (probable)	A cottage, possibly originating as a stable, it is in sandstone with a stone slate roof. The cottage has a rectangular plan of two unequal bays and two storeys. Some of the windows are mullioned.	II
Hurstwood Hall; 53.77831°N 2.18158°W		1579	A sandstone house with a stone-slate roof, it is an L-shaped plan, and consists of a hall, a cross-wing, and a short rear wing. The house is in two storeys and most of the windows are mullioned. The rear wing has a wide gable and contains a Tudor arched doorway above which is an inscribed datestone.	II*
Rowley Hall; 53.79337°N 2.21059°W		1593	A country house, later enlarged, giving it an irregular plan. It is in sandstone with a stone-slate roof, and with two storeys. There is a two-storey gabled porch, the windows are mullioned, and some are also transomed, and on some of the gables are ball finials.	II
Barn near Spencer House, Hurstwood; 53.77840°N 2.18196°W	—	c. 1600 (probable)	Formerly an aisled barn, later converted into a post office and a cottage. The building is in sandstone with stone slate roofs, and has four bays. There are opposed wagon entrances, ventilation holes, and later inserted openings.	II
High Halstead Farmhouse, Worsthorne; 53.79770°N 2.18285°W		c. 1600 (probable)	A sandstone farmhouse with a stone-slate roof, and an added 19th-century cottage at the right. The farmhouse has two storeys and three bays. Most of the windows are mullioned.	II
Jackson's Farmhouse and Cottage, Worsthorne; 53.78815°N 2.18887°W		c. 1600 (probable)	A farmhouse later converted into two dwellings, originating as a hall and an earlier cross-wing. It is in sandstone with a stone-slate roof, in two storeys and with a modified T-shaped plan. At the left end is a two-storey gabled porch, and the windows are mullioned. Inside is a timber-framed partition. The wall enclosing the rectangular garden in front of the building is included in the listing.	II*
Rose Cottage and Brookside, Hurstwood; 53.77863°N 2.17989°W		c. 1600 (probable)	A farmhouse, later divided into two dwellings, in There are two storeys and the building has a rectangular three-bay plan. The original entrance is in the left dwelling, it has a lean-to porch and a doorway with a triangular head. Some of the windows are mullioned.	II
Tattersalls Farmhouse, House and Wood Nook Cottage, Hurstwood; 53.77854°N 2.18281°W	—	c. 1600 (probable)	This was originally a farmhouse, later extended, and since divided into three dwellings. It is in sandstone with a stone-slate roof, with two storeys and a long rectangular range of four bays. Most of the windows are mullioned.	II
Barn, Tattersalls Farm, Hurstwood; 53.77841°N 2.18300°W	—	c. 1600 (probable)	The barn is in sandstone with a stone-slate roof. It has four bays with outshuts on the east. The barn contains a wagon entrance, doorways, a mullioned window, ventilation slits, and later inserted openings.	II
Higher Bottin Farmhouse and Cottage, Worsthorne; 53.79414°N 2.18424°W	—	Early 17th century (probable)	Originally two farmhouses under one roof, they are in sandstone with slate roofs. The houses have two storeys, and each is in has two bays, with a lean-to extension at the rear. Some of the windows are mullioned.	II
Lower Bottin Farmhouse, Worsthorne; 53.79392°N 2.18505°W		Early 17th century (probable)	A sandstone farmhouse with a stone-slate roof, with two storeys, a rectangular plan, and three bays. The windows were mullioned, but most have been lost. At the right end is a modern single-storey flat-roofed porch.	II
Moorfell Farmhouse and Cottage, Hurstwood; 53.77903°N 2.17963°W	—	Early 17th century (probable)	A farmhouse, later divided into two dwellings in sandstone with stone-slate roof. They have two storeys and four bays, the right two bays projecting slightly forward. There are mullioned windows in both floors of the second bay, and another in the left gable end; the other windows have been altered.	II
Wallstreams and Cottage, Worsthorne; 53.78704°N 2.18926°W	—	Early 17th century (probable)	Originally a farmhouse, later divided into two dwellings, it is in sandstone with slate roofs. There have two storeys, a two-bay front, and a two-storey outshut to the north. On the rear is a 2 1/2-storey porch containing a moulded doorway with a hood mould. The windows are mullioned. In the gable of the porch, and in the east gable, are small blind ogee-headed windows.	II
11, 13 and 15 Church Square, Worsthorne; 53.78752°N 2.19063°W		18th century	Originally six back-to-back cottages, later converted into two shops and a cottage. They have two storeys, and each has a single bay. Nos 13 and 15 have shop fronts in the ground floor and doorways to the right with simple pediments. No. 11 has a large rectangular window and a doorway to the left. The windows in the upper floor vary; one has a mullion with sashes, and there are more mullioned windows at the rear.	II
Rowley Farmhouse; 53.79354°N 2.21013°W	—	Late 18th century	A sandstone farmhouse with a hipped roof of Welsh slate. It has two storeys and a four-bay front. All the windows are sashes and some are mullioned.	II
Hollins Hall, Worsthorne; 53.78474°N 2.20149°W		1818	A large sandstone house with slate roofs, in Jacobean style. It has 2 1/2 storeys, and a three-bay gabled front with a single-storey gabled porch. All the gables have ball finials, and in the house gables are small rose windows. The ground floor windows are mullioned, and those above have altered glazing.	II
Hollins Farmhouse, Worsthorne; 53.78497°N 2.20132°W	—	1818 (probable)	Originally the coach house and stable block to Hollins Hall, it was later converted into a house. It is in Jacobean style, built in sandstone with stone-slate roofs, and has two storeys and three gabled bays. Each bay contains a blocked Tudor arched doorway, a mullioned window in the ground floor, a sash window in the upper floor, and a bullseye window in the gable, on the apex of which is a ball finial.	II
St John the Evangelist's Church, Worsthorne; 53.78780°N 2.18924°W		1834–35	The church was designed by Lewis Vulliamy, the chancel was added in 1894 by W. B. Colbram, and in 1903–04 Austin and Paley built the tower and made internal alterations. The church is built in sandstone with slate roofs, and is in Early English style. It consists of a nave, a chancel, and a west tower. The tower is in three unequal stages, and has a west doorway. In the top stage are louvred bell openings, roundels containing quatrefoils, and a clock face on the west side.	II
Barn, Moorfell Farm, Hurstwood; 53.77876°N 2.17973°W		1867	The barn is in sandstone and has five bays. On the east side is a wagon entrance that is flanked by outshuts. In the south gable is an owl hole with a square surround inscribed with the date.	II
Telephone kiosk, Hurstwood; 53.77834°N 2.18116°W	—	1935	A K6 type telephone kiosk, designed by Giles Gilbert Scott. Constructed in cast iron with a square plan and a dome, it has three unperforated crowns in the top panels.	II
