= Fother Royd Wood =

Woodland in Lancashire, England

- Location within the Borough of Burnley

Geography
- Location: Lancashire, England
- OS grid: SD877315
- Coordinates: 53.780°N 2.187°W
- Area: 1.03 hectares (2.55 acres)

Administration
- Authority: Woodland Trust

Fother Royd Wood is a woodland in Lancashire, England, near Worsthorne. It covers a total area of 1.03 hectares (2.55 acres). It is owned and managed by the Woodland Trust.
