= List of miscellaneous works by Lewis Vulliamy =

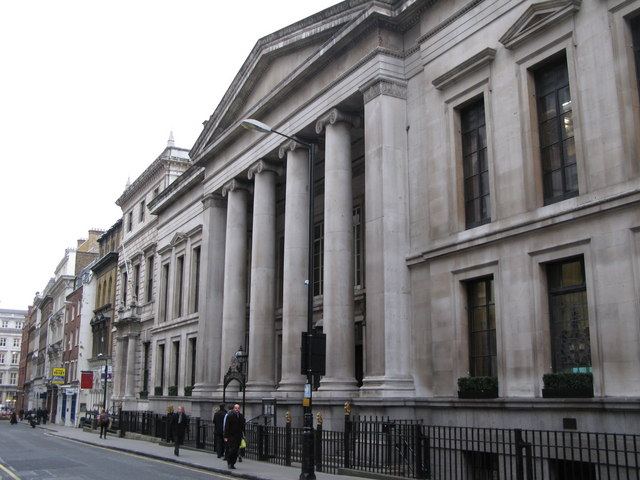
Headquarters of The Law Society in London

Lewis Vulliamy (1791–1871) was an English architect who is best known for his work on large houses. He was born in Pall Mall, London, into a family of clock and watchmakers. At the age of 16 he was articled to the architect Robert Smirke, and from 1809 he studied at the Royal Academy Schools where he won the silver and gold medals. In 1818 he was awarded a scholarship from the academy, allowing him to study for four years on the continent where he spent most of the time in Italy.

On his return to England, Vulliamy established his practice in Oxford Street, London. His first commission was for work on Syston Park in Lincolnshire for Sir John Hayford Thorold. Following the Church Building Acts of 1818 and 1824, he became involved with the Church Commissioners, designing, with others, a series of churches that have become to be known as Commissioners' churches. Vulliamy designed at least 14 churches for the Commissioners. He also designed a variety of public buildings, including a grandstand at Wolverhampton Racecourse, the Lock Hospital in Paddington, new premises for The Law Society in London, and the re-fronting of the premises of the Royal Institution, also in London.

Vulliamy's best known works were on large country and town houses. In addition to his work on Syston Park, he designed other country houses, including Boothby Hall, Lincolnshire. His major patron was Robert Stayner Holford, for whom he carried out work on Westonbirt House in Gloucestershire, and also designed his London residence, Dorchester House in Park Lane. These two houses are considered to be Vulliamy's most important works. Vulliamy published two works: The Bridge of the SSa. Trinita, over the Arno at Florence (1822), and Examples of ornamental sculpture in architecture (1823). For several years he suffered from chronic bronchitis, and he died at his home on Clapham Common in 1871. His estate was valued at about £60,000 (equivalent to £7,060,000 in 2023).

This list contains details of Vulliamy's work on structures other than ecclesiastical buildings and large houses.

== Key ==
Grade	Criteria
Grade I	Buildings of exceptional interest, sometimes considered to be internationally important.
Grade II*	Particularly important buildings of more than special interest.
Grade II	Buildings of national importance and special interest.
"—" denotes a work that is not graded.

== Works ==
Name	Location	Photograph	Date	Notes	Grade
Stable block, Bloxholm Hall	Bloxholm, Lincolnshire; 53.0721°N 0.4136°W		1825		II
Connaught Hall and attached terrace	Tavistock Square, Bloomsbury, Camden, Greater London; 51.5248°N 0.1297°W		1825–26	A terrace of 17 houses, some of which have been converted into a students' hall of residence.	II*
Corn Exchange	Bishop's Stortford, Hertfordshire; 51.8710°N 0.1588°E		1828	Later used by a building society.	II
Grandstand, Wolverhampton Racecourse	Wolverhampton, West Midlands		1828	The racecourse has since moved to a different site.	
County Court	Wolverhampton, West Midlands; 52.5856°N 2.1243°W		1829	Added upper storey to Assembly Rooms.	II*
The Law Society	Chancery Lane, City of London; 51.5150°N 0.1118°W		1831		II*
Hickeys Almshouses	Richmond, Greater London; 51.4624°N 0.2904°W		1834		II*
Workhouse	Brentford, Hounslow, Greater London		1837–38		
Laundry, St. Margaret's Hospital	Epping, Essex; 51.7041°N 0.1231°E		1837–38		II
Workhouse	Epping, Essex		1837–38		
Workhouse	Sturminster Newton, Dorset; 50.9323°N 2.3048°W		1838		II
Royal Institution	Albemarle Street, Westminster; Greater London; 51.5097°N 0.1425°W		1838	New frontage added.	I
King's School	Rochester, Kent; 51.3873°N 0.5016°E		1841		II
Lock Hospital	Harrow Road, Paddington, Westminster, Greater London		1842–49		
Stable yard, offices and clock tower, Tregothnan	St Michael Penkevil, Cornwall; 50.2356°N 5.0065°W		1845–48		II*
Monument to Lord Edward Somerset	Hawkesbury, Gloucestershire; 51.5872°N 2.3301°W		1846		II*
Chestal Lodge	Cam, Gloucestershire; 51.6826°N 2.3491°W		1848	A lodge with gates and gatepiers for James Phelps.	II
Two gazebos and terrace, Chestal House	Cam, Gloucestershire; 51.6826°N 2.3413°W		c. 1850		II
Snooty Fox Hotel	Tetbury, Gloucestershire; 51.6371°N 2.1591°W		1851–52	With a core dating back to the 16th century, the hotel was rebuilt to plans by Vulliamy.	II

== See also ==
- List of ecclesiastical works by Lewis Vulliamy
- List of works by Lewis Vulliamy on large houses
