= St Peter's, Bethnal Green =

Coordinates: 51°31′49″N 0°3′52″W

St Peter's Bethnal Green
- Church of St Peter with St Thomas
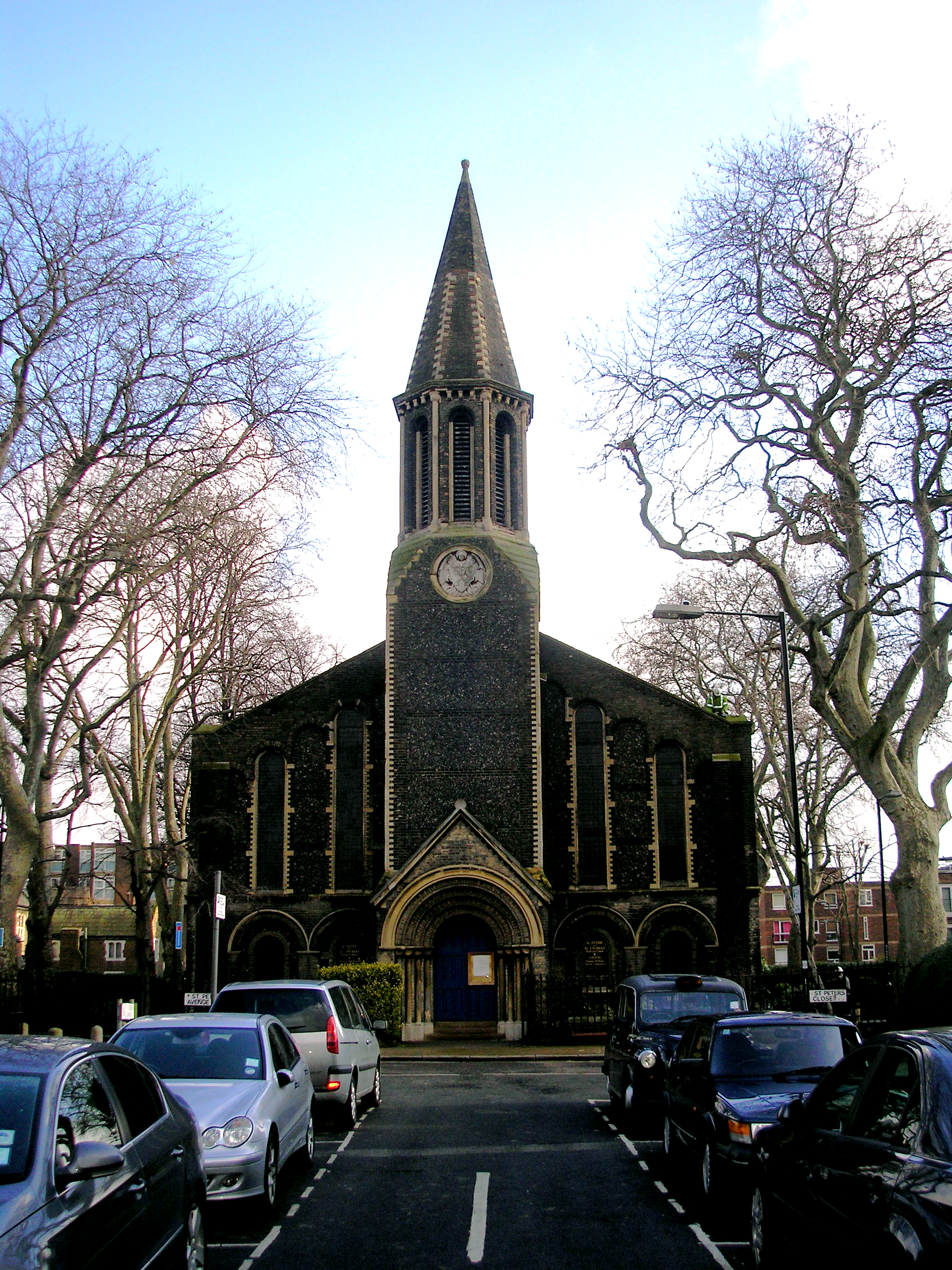
- St Peter's Bethnal Green
- St Peter's Bethnal Green
- Location: St Peter's Close, Bethnal Green, Tower Hamlets, London E2 7AE
- Country: England
- Denomination: Church of England
- Website: stpetersbethnalgreen.org

Architecture
- Years built: 19th century

Administration
- Diocese: London

St Peter's Bethnal Green is a 19th-century church in Bethnal Green, London, England.

== History ==
Built as the first of a group of new churches which, in a remarkable church planting movement led by Bishop Blomfied, came to be known as the '12 apostles of Bethnal Green'. This was an offshoot of Blomfield's Metropolitan Church Fund for Bethnal Green churches.

=== Present day ===
In the summer of 2010, the church entered into a church planting partnership with St Paul's Shadwell to re-energise the church. Since then the congregation has grown from 20 to 120. There are many community projects undertaken and three different types of Sunday service offered at 10am and 11am across a regular month. It is a 'cross-tradition' Anglican church in the Diocese of London, with a mixture of sacramental and charismatic worship, and with a strong emphasis on connecting with the parish.

== Architecture ==
Built as a commissioners' church in 1840–1, its architect was Lewis Vulliamy. The Vicarage is adjacent, as is a church school, now an organ works. All three buildings are Grade II listed.

As built, its general configuration was that of a typical late Georgian preaching box – broad nave with galleries, west tower and shallow chancel. It was built of stock brick with knapped flint panels and stucco and terracotta trim. The style is very free neo-Norman. St Peter's is now one of only five functioning churches to survive from Bishop Blomfield's original 1840s Bethnal Green churches, and is the only one that remains fully intact. The others were either destroyed in the Blitz or by fire or have now been converted into flats.
