= Lewis Vulliamy =

English architect

- Born: 15 March 1791; London, England
- Died: 4 February 1871 (aged 79); London, England
- Education: Royal Academy Schools
- Occupation: Architect
- Parent: Benjamin Vulliamy
- Relatives: Benjamin Lewis Vulliamy (brother)

Lewis Vulliamy (15 March 1791 – 4 January 1871) was an English architect descended from the Vulliamy family of clockmakers.

== Life ==
Lewis Vulliamy was the son of the clockmaker Benjamin Vulliamy. He was born in Pall Mall, London on 15 March 1791, and articled to Sir Robert Smirke. He was admitted to the Royal Academy Schools in 1809, where he won the silver medal the year after for an architectural drawing, and the gold medal in 1813. He was elected Royal Academy travelling student in 1818, after which he studied abroad for four years, mostly in Italy, but also visiting Greece and Asia Minor.

He was a great-uncle of the art potter Blanche Georgiana Vulliamy.

Vulliamy died at Clapham Common, on 4 January 1871.

== Works ==
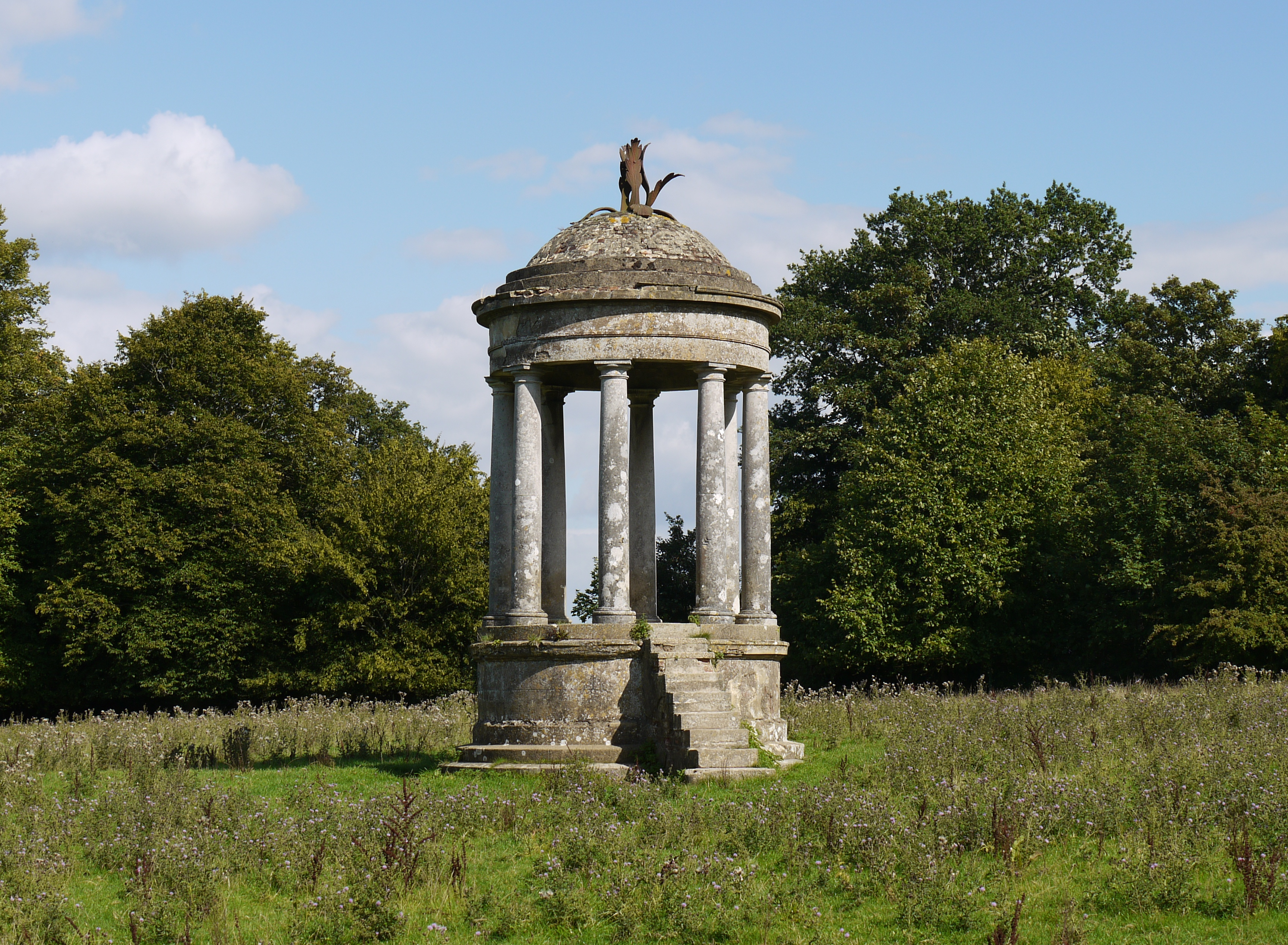
A folly known as The Beacon in Staunton Country Park which was designed by Lewis Vulliamy

- speculative housing in Tavistock Square and Gordon (later Endsleigh) Place in Bloomsbury (1827)
- Neo-Gothic churches in the London area
  - St Bartholomew's, Sydenham (1826–31)
  - St Barnabas's, Addison Road, Kensington (1828–9)
  - St Michael's, Highgate (1830–32)
  - Christ Church, Woburn Square (1831–3, demolished)
  - St John the Divine, Richmond (1836)
  - St James' Church, Norlands (1844–45)

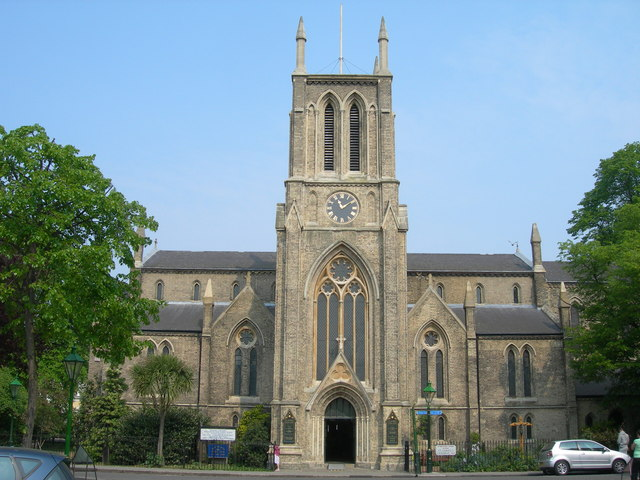
Church of St James Norlands

- Other churches:
  - St John the Baptist's Church, Smallbridge in Wardle, Greater Manchester
  - St John the Evangelist's Church, Worsthorne
  - Burnley (Holy Trinity, Accrington Lane)
  - Habergam Eaves
  - St Paul's, Burslem
  - Christ Church, Cobridge, in Staffordshire
  - Christ Church, Todmorden, Yorkshire
  - St Mary and St Laurence's Church, Rosedale Abbey
  - Glasbury church in Brecknockshire (1836–7)
  - the Italianate All Saints', Ennismore Gardens, Westminster (1848–9), now the Russian Orthodox Patriarchial Church of The Assumption of All Saints

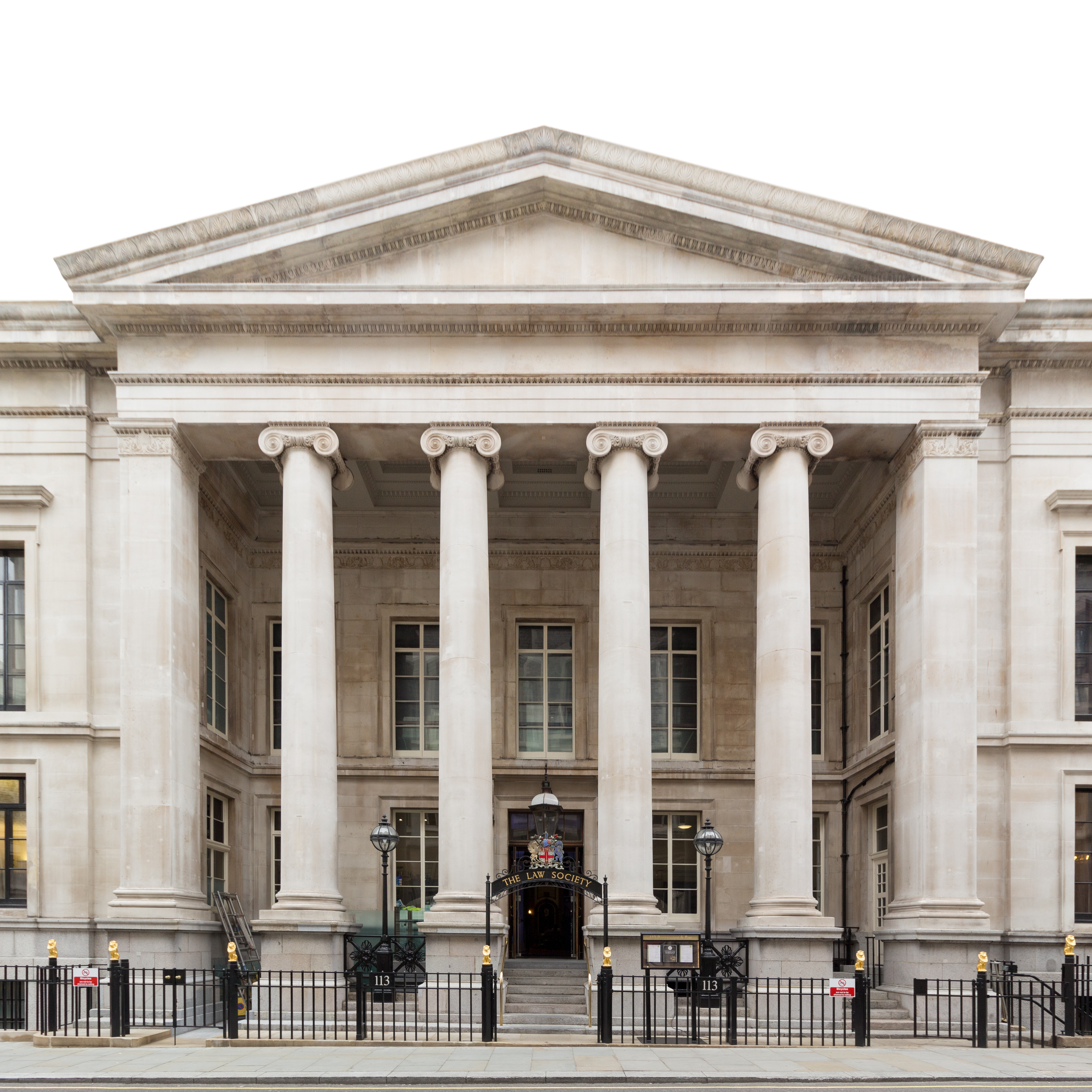
Headquarters of the Law Society on Chancery Lane, London

  - St Peter's, Bethnal Green
  - St James the Less, Bethnal Green
  - St Thomas, Bethnal Green (damaged during WWII and demolished)
  - (Former) All Saints Church, Kensington (with Charles Harrison Townsend) restoration and additions (1887-1897) Now, Russian Orthodox Cathedral of the Dormition of the Mother of God and All Saints.
- works at Rochester Cathedral (mid-1840s)
- a grandstand at Wolverhampton racecourse (1828)
- Epping union workhouse (1837)
- the Lock Hospital, Paddington (1842–9)
- the Law Society's premises in Chancery Lane (1828–32)
- the re-fronting of the Royal Institution in Albemarle Street (1838), adding a giant Corinthian half-column screen
- Syston Park

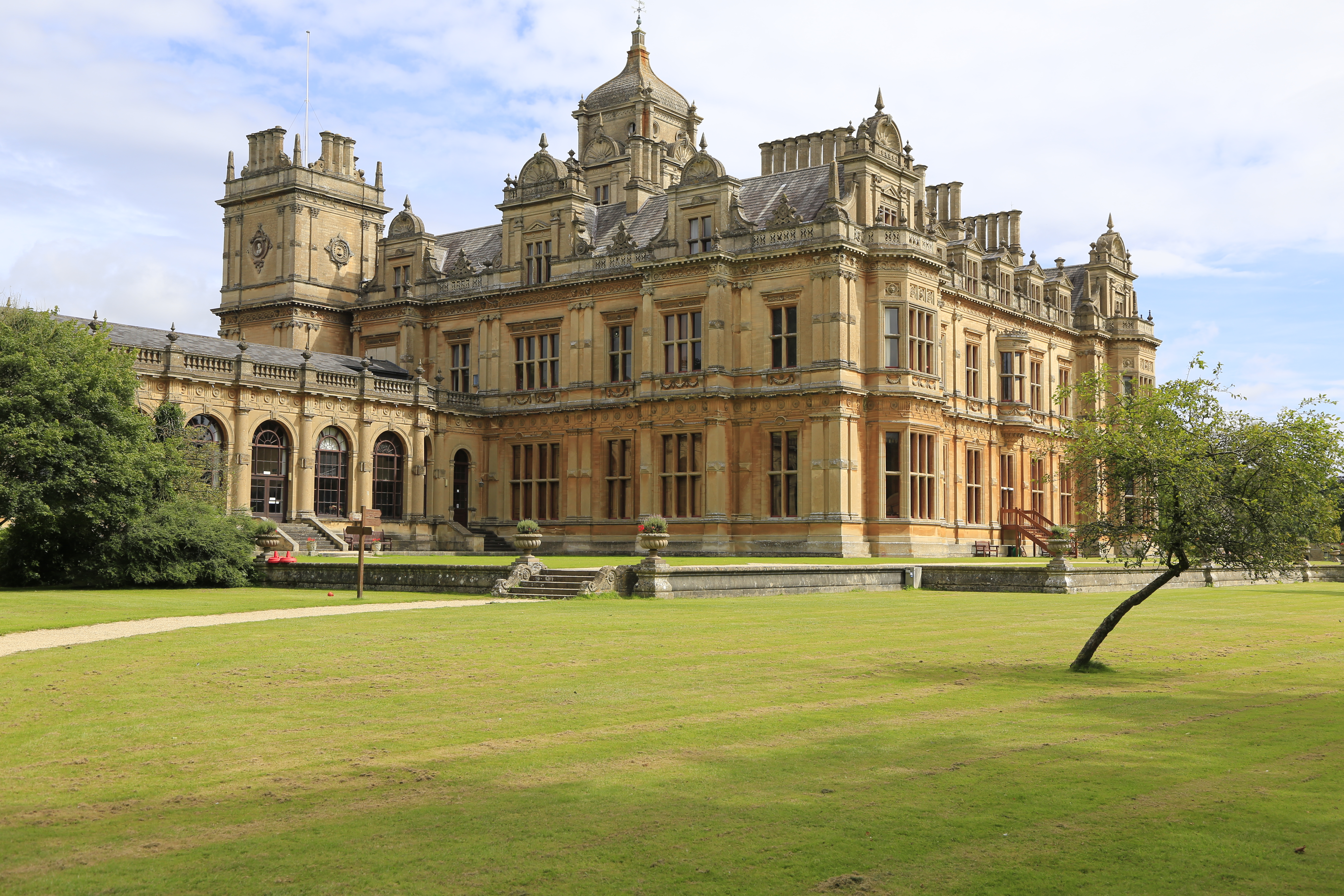
Westonbirt House in Gloucestershire

- Friday Hill House, Friday Hill, London
- Boothby Pagnell Hall (1825)
- Dingestow Court, Dingestow, Monmouthshire (1845-6), addition of an Elizabethan style south front
- Westonbirt House
- Dorchester House, on Park Lane, London (demolished)
- Various structures in Staunton Country Park
- Dinder House Outer wings to this classic Regency House in Somerset.

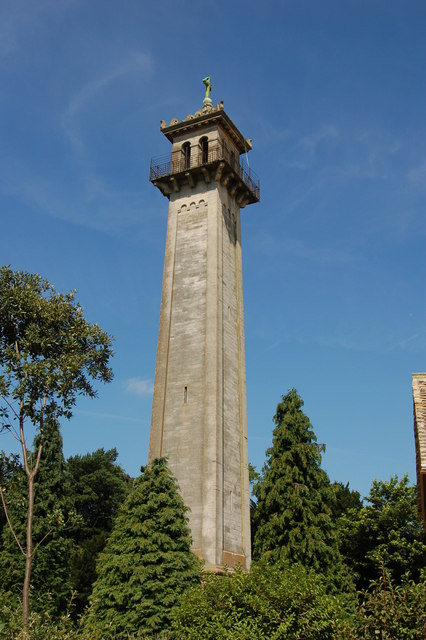
Somerset Monument, Hawkesbury, Gloucestershire

- The monument to Lord Edward Somerset at Hawkesbury Upton in 1843

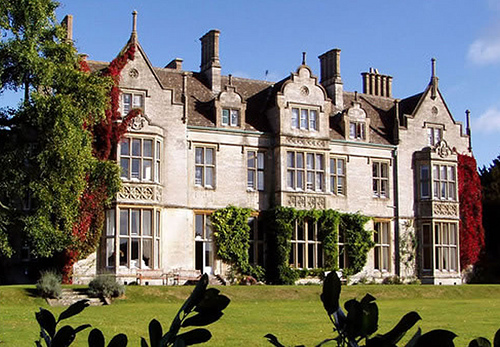
Alderley House as designed by Lewis Vulliamy for Robert Blagden Hale, viewed from the garden side looking northeast (March 2008)

- Alderley House, a neo-Elizabethan manor house next to the church of St Kenelm in Alderley, Gloucestershire (formerly Rose Hill School until July 2009)

He drew the plans, elevations, and sections of the castle of Newcastle-upon-Tyne, published in Vetusta Monumenta,' 1835 (vol. v. plates x–xviii).

Published the book "Examples of Ornamental Sculpture in Architecture Drawn from the originals of Bronze, Marble, and Terra Cotta, In Greece, Asia Minor, and Italy - in the years 1818,1819, 1820 and part of 1821.- By Lewis Vulliamy Architect and engraved by Henry Moses." Size 470 x 330mm. 40 n0 folios. (Digitised version, Unibibliothek Heidelberg). Includes fine engravings of architectural details from: The Choragic Monument of Lysicrates, Athens, Ornamental termination of the marble tiles at each corner of the Parthenon, capital from ruins of Temple of Apollo Didymeus, part of the soffit of Temple of Jupiter, part of frieze of Temple of the sun from the Gardens of the Colonna Palace in the Quirinal Hill at Rome and others.

== See also ==
- List of ecclesiastical works by Lewis Vulliamy
- List of works by Lewis Vulliamy on large houses
- List of miscellaneous works by Lewis Vulliamy
