= Worsthorne =

Village in Lancashire, England

Coordinates: 53.787°N 2.191°W

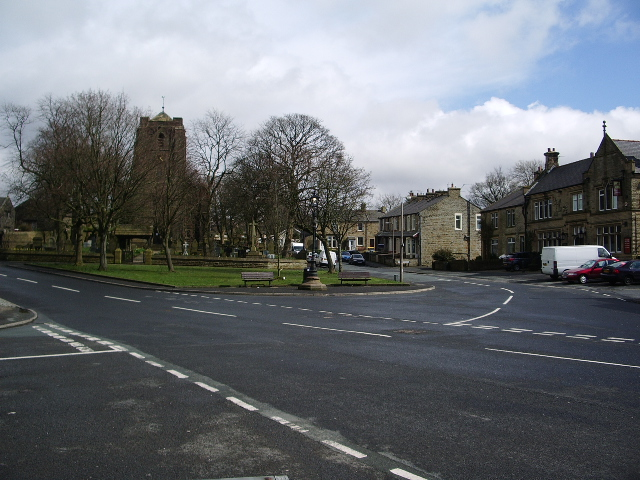
- Church Square, Worsthorne

- Shown within Burnley Borough Location within Lancashire
- Population: 1,028 (2011)
- OS grid reference: SD875325
- Civil parish: Worsthorne-with-Hurstwood
- District: Burnley
- Shire county: Lancashire
- Region: North West
- Country: England
- Sovereign state: United Kingdom
- Post town: BURNLEY
- Postcode district: BB10
- Dialling code: 01282
- Police: Lancashire
- Fire: Lancashire
- Ambulance: North West
- UK Parliament: Burnley
- Website: worsthorne.net

Worsthorne is a rural village on the eastern outskirts of Burnley in Lancashire, England. It is in the civil parish of Worsthorne-with-Hurstwood and the borough of Burnley. At the 2011 census the village had a population of 1,028.

The village was known as Worthesthorn in 1202, which means "thorn tree of a man named 'Weorth'."

The village has a small village green, overlooked by the church and Bay Horse public house. Buildings in the village include cottages dating from the 16th and 17th centuries, and housing for millworkers dating from the Industrial Revolution. Relatively high property prices in the village reflect the fact that it is perceived to be a desirable place to live, with low crime and good education.

== History ==
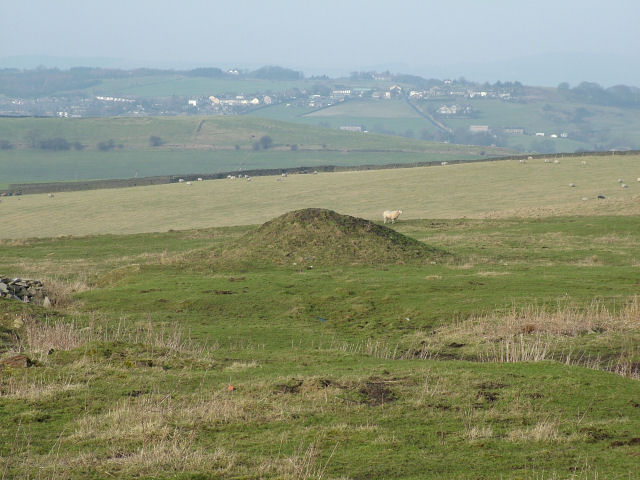
Stone circle near Worsthorne

The history of human habitation in the area goes back to the late stone, bronze and Iron Ages. Earthworks and two prehistoric stone circles are shown on Ordnance Survey maps, one at grid reference SD885327 on the moors to the east of the village; both are in a poor state of repair. A flint dagger 15 cm in length found on the moor is now in Towneley Museum.

== Governance ==
Worsthorne forms part of the Worsthorne with Cliviger ward, which is currently represented on Burnley Borough Council by two Green Party councillors. In 2002 the ward elected a British National Party (BNP) councillor, which generated considerable media comment at the time; the seat returned to the Conservative Party when it was next contested. In the 2021 local elections, the ward returned a Green Party councillor for the first time. In 2022 The Green Party won a 2nd seat to become the majority party in the ward for the first time.

== Landmarks ==
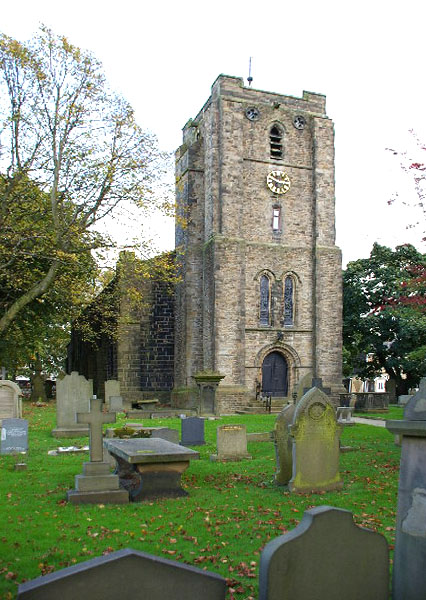
Church of St. John the Evangelist, Worsthorne

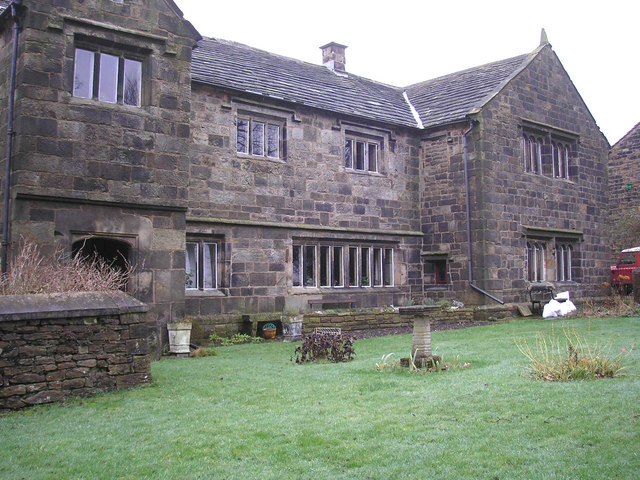
Jackson's House in the centre of Worsthorne, built around 1600

The village had a close association with the Thursby family, benefactors of the Burnley area, and has a number of listed buildings. These include Jackson's House in the centre of the village, which was built in about 1600, and the Church of St. John the Evangelist which dates from 1833–1839. The original plans for the church, drawn up by architect Lewis Vulliamy, can be seen on the Incorporated Church Building Society website. It has a 61 ft clocktower, stained glass windows and wrought ironwork. The churchyard has the grave of a packmaster, a person whose job was to lead packhorses across the moors in special sunken trails that allowed the horses to walk unhitched since the walls of the trail prevented them from straying.

An earlier landmark used to be Worsthorne Methodist Chapel, on Chapel Street off Ormerod Street, next to where the former Old Hall stood, but it was demolished in the 1980s, an old people's home now sits on this site. The connected Sunday School building is now a children's nursery.

There is a former cotton mill in Gordon Street, a relic of the time when the area, especially Burnley, was the world centre of cotton weaving.

There are two public houses in the village: the Crooked Billet and the Bay Horse Inn.

== Education ==
The village has a primary school with about 180 pupils in the 4–11 age range, serving Worsthorne, Hurstwood, Brownside and Pike Hill. The school houses seven classes in modern buildings and has extensive playing fields and grounds. Students used to be organised into four houses, Gorple, Extwistle, Brownside and Ormerod, which were named after the four roads running into Worsthorne and which meet in the village square. However, in 2020 the houses were renamed to Earth, Wind, Fire and Water. The original village school house, now converted into residential housing, stands in the square.

== Transport ==
A regular bus service (route 4) runs between Worsthorne, Burnley and Stoops. On Mondays to Fridays, the first bus leaves the village square at 06:53 and services then run hourly until 18:53

== Notable people ==
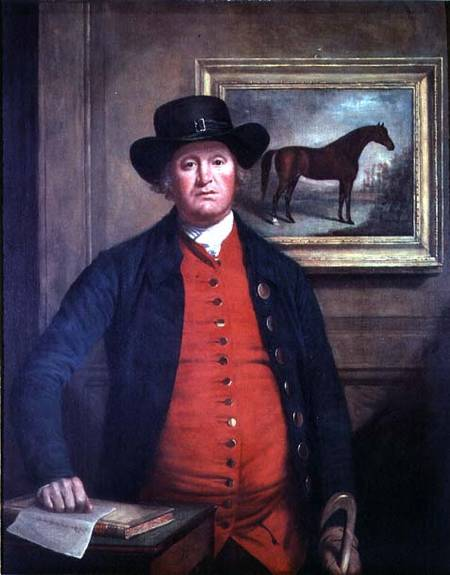
Richard Tattersall, 1790

- Richard Tattersall (1724–1795), horse auctioneer and the founder of the racehorse auctioneers Tattersalls.
- Thomas Whitham VC (1888–1924), soldier, First World War, recipient of the Victoria Cross
- Catriona Seth (born 1964), Marshal Foch Professor of French Literature at the University of Oxford

=== Sport ===
- Ron Greenwood CBE (1921–2006), football player and manager, played 308 games, managed England 1977/1982
- Brian Miller (1937–2007), footballer, played 379 games at Burnley, then manager 1979/1983 and 1986/1989

== See also ==
- Listed buildings in Worsthorne-with-Hurstwood
