= St John the Evangelist's Church, Worsthorne =

Coordinates: 53.7878°N 2.1892°W

St John the Evangelist Church, Worsthorne
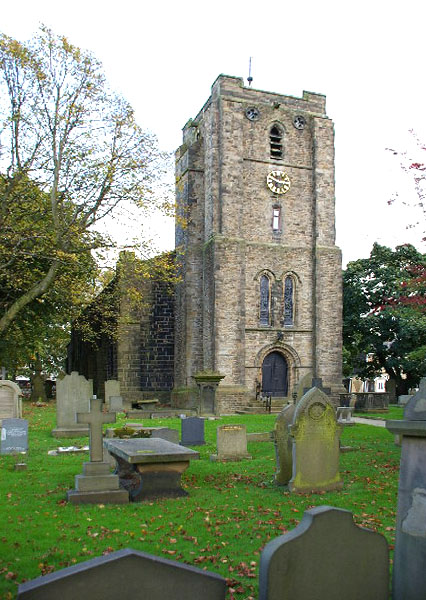
- St John the Evangelist's Church, Worsthorne, from the west

- Location in the Borough of Burnley
- OS grid reference: SD 876,324
- Location: Church Square, Worsthorne, Lancashire
- Country: England
- Denomination: Anglican
- Churchmanship: Central
- Website: St John the Evangelist, Worsthorne

History
- Status: Parish church
- Dedication: John the Evangelist

Architecture
- Functional status: Active
- Heritage designation: Grade II
- Designated: 17 December 1968
- Architect(s): Lewis Vulliamy; W. B. Colbram; Austin and Paley
- Architectural type: Church
- Style: Gothic Revival (Early English)
- Groundbreaking: 1834
- Completed: 1902

Specifications
- Materials: Sandstone, slate roofs

Administration
- Province: York
- Diocese: Blackburn
- Archdeaconry: Burnley
- Deanery: Burnley
- Parish: St John the Evangelist, Worsthorne

Clergy
- Vicar: Vacant

St John the Evangelist Church is in Church Square in the village of Worsthorne, Lancashire, England. It is an active Anglican parish church in the deanery of Burnley, the archdeaconry of Burnley, and the diocese of Blackburn. The church is recorded in the National Heritage List for England as a designated Grade II listed building.

== History ==
The church was built in 1834–35 to a design by Lewis Vulliamy, and the chancel was added in 1894 by W. B. Colbram. In 1903–04 the Lancaster architects Austin and Paley built the west tower and removed old vestries at the west end extending the seating. Financial contributions to all stages of the building were made by the local colliery-owning families of Hargreaves and Thursby. The chapelry district of Saint John, Worsthorne was assigned in 1843. The galleries were removed in 1902, followed by the internal plasterwork in 1929. The interior of the church was partitioned in 1973 to make rooms in two storeys at the west end.

== Architecture ==
St John's is constructed in sandstone with slate roofs. Its architectural style is Early English. The plan consists of a five-bay nave, a chancel, and a west tower. The tower is in three stages, the upper two stages being set back. At the corners are clasping pilaster-straps, and the plain parapet is further set back. The bottom stage contains an arched west doorway, above which is a pair of lancet windows. Five steps lead up to the doorway, with a wrought iron handrail on the left side. The handrail was designed by Brian Rourke in 1979 and is decorated with representations of the local industry. The middle stage of the tower contains small chamfered windows on each side and a clock face on the west side. The top stage has louvred, arched bell openings, and roundels containing quatrefoils. The bays of the nave are separated by shallow buttresses, and each bay contains a large lancet window. The east window consists of three equal lancets. The east window and the windows in the tower contain stained glass designed by George Wragge and date from the 1930s.

== External features ==
The churchyard contains the war graves of two soldiers of World War I and a soldier of World War II.

== See also ==
- Listed buildings in Worsthorne-with-Hurstwood
- List of ecclesiastical works by Austin and Paley (1895–1914)
