= Dingad of Llandingat =

5th century Welsh saint

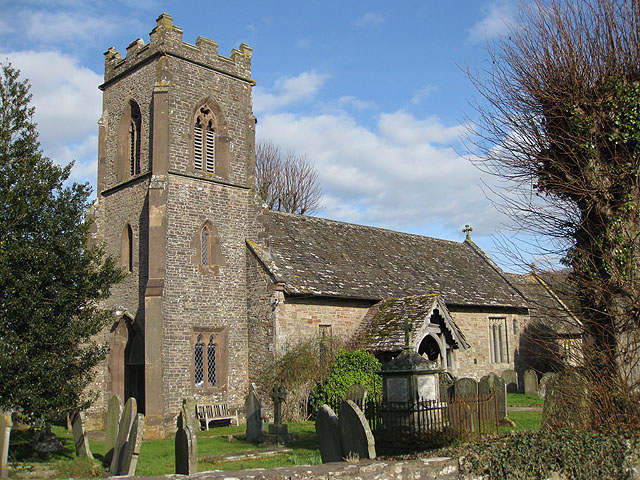
St Dingat's Church, Dingestow

Dingad or Dingat ap Brychan was a late 5th century Welsh saint and early Christian church founder.

He is recorded in all the early 'Brychan documents' as a son of King Brychan, King of the Welsh kingdom of Brycheiniog in south-east Wales.

He was patron of Llandingat Church (in Llandovery) in Carmarthenshire and of Dingestow in Monmouthshire. It is, however, sometimes suggested that the latter village's titular is Dingad ap Nudd Hael, so-called 'King of Brynbuga' (Usk in Monmouthshire).

== Sources ==
- Farmer, David Hugh. (1978). The Oxford Dictionary of Saints. Oxford: Oxford University Press.
