= St Michael's Church, Highgate =

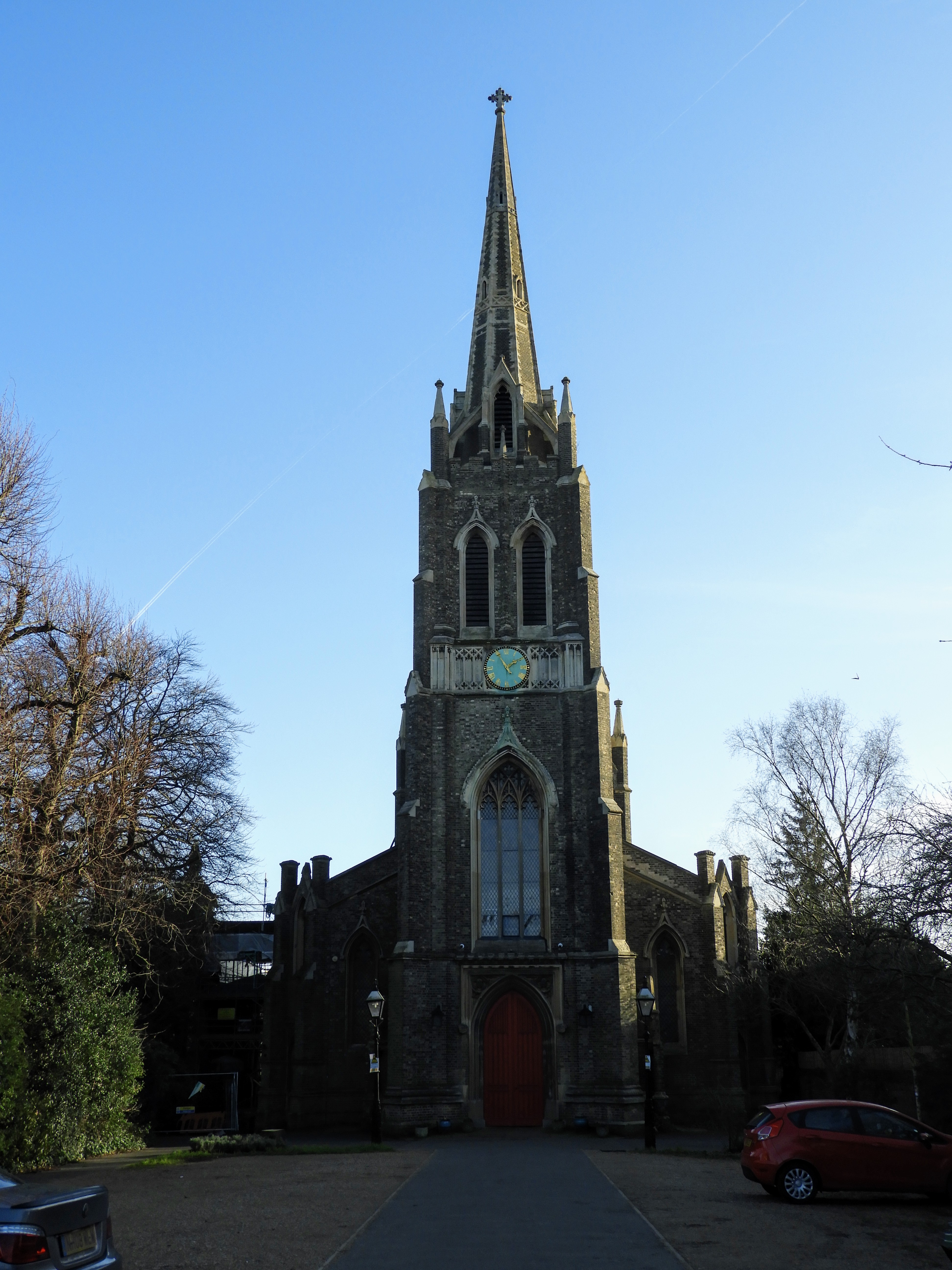
- St Michael's Church, Highgate
- 51°34′08″N 0°09′01″W
- Location: South Grove; Highgate; London N6 6BJ
- Country: England
- Denomination: Anglican
- Website: St Michael's Highgate

History
- Status: Parish church

Architecture
- Functional status: Active
- Heritage designation: Grade II*
- Designated: 8 November 1832
- Architect: Lewis Vulliamy
- Architectural type: Church
- Style: Neo-Gothic
- Construction cost: £8,171

Administration
- Diocese: London
- Archdeaconry: Hampstead

Listed Building – Grade II*
- Official name: Church of St Michael
- Designated: 29 June 1954
- Reference no.: 1378767

St Michael's Church or Church of St Michael, commonly referred to as St Michael's Highgate, is an Anglican parish church in Highgate, North London and a Grade II* listed building. It is the highest elevated church in London.

== History ==
There are records dating back to the twelfth century of a small hermitage chapel at the top of Highgate Hill. It closed in 1539 during the dissolution of monasteries and was acquired by Sir Roger Cholmeley, who used the site for his new school with permission from Elizabeth I in 1565. A brick school chapel was built from 1576, which would serve as a parish church for Highgate residents for 250 years. An adjoining burial ground was consecrated for interments in 1617, and a preacher was appointed in 1637.

By the early 19th-century, the Highgate School chapel was in need of repairs and expansion to accommodate the growing local population. In 1822, a bill was put before Parliament to allow school governors to demolish and replace the chapel, but after years of fierce opposition and legal challenges, the bill was struck down by the Court of Chancery in 1826: the church would have to be built on a different site.

On the site of the derelict Ashhurst House (demolished 1830) with support from the school governors, St Michael's Church was built over eleven months, designed in the Neo-Gothic style by Lewis Vulliamy at the relatively inexpensive cost of £8,171. It went unused for ninth months due to a peculiar legal issue regarding its location on land from the Parish of St Pancras. After an act of Parliament resolved the issue, the church was officially consecrated on 8 November 1832. The Parish of St Michael was established in 1834.

The original organ was installed in 1842, and the pulpit in 1848. Choir practices began in 1865. The old burial ground remained in use by St Michael's, but was closed to new interments in 1857 barring special applications.

The church underwent renovations and extensions in 1880 by George Edmund Street and 1903 by Temple Moore. It was damaged by a bomb in 1944. Restoration on the building began in 1946, and it received its Grade II* listed status on 29 June 1954. Evie Hone contributed to the church's new stained glass windows.

== Notable features ==
The church stands on the periphery of Highgate Cemetery. The spire forms a landmark skyline with Witanhurst, which can be viewed from Hampstead Heath and Parliament Hill in particular.

Edmund Grindal and Sir Roger Cholmeley's coats of arms are carved into the West door's corbels.

Some bricks and other remains of Ashurst House are still visible.

Beneath the church is a 17th-century wine cellar. In 2018, the burial site of Samuel Taylor Coleridge and his family was uncovered. The poet has a plaque.

== Gallery ==
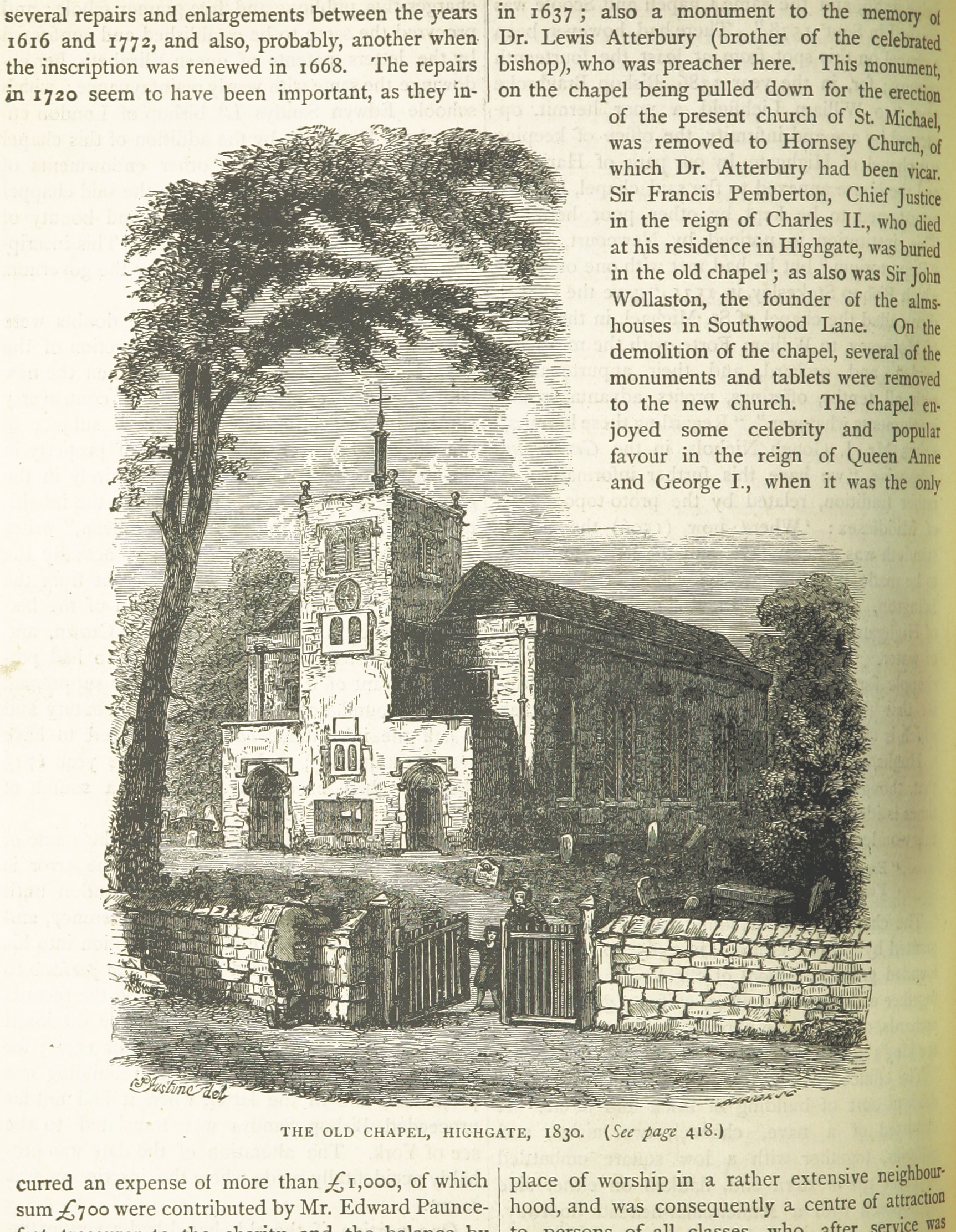
The Old Chapel, 1830

Woodcut of St Michael's Highgate shortly after its completion, May 1832

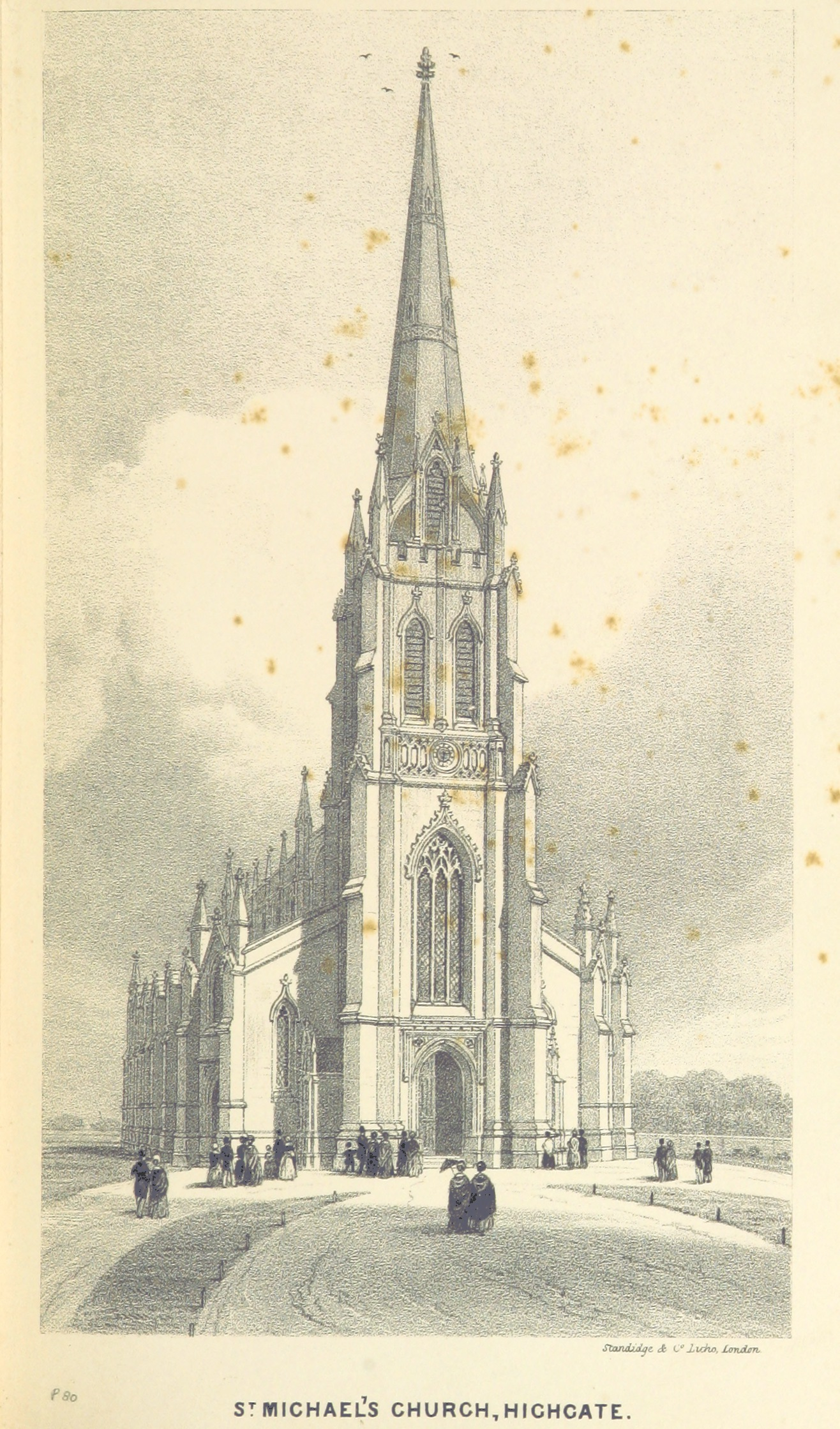
St Michael's Highgate, 1842

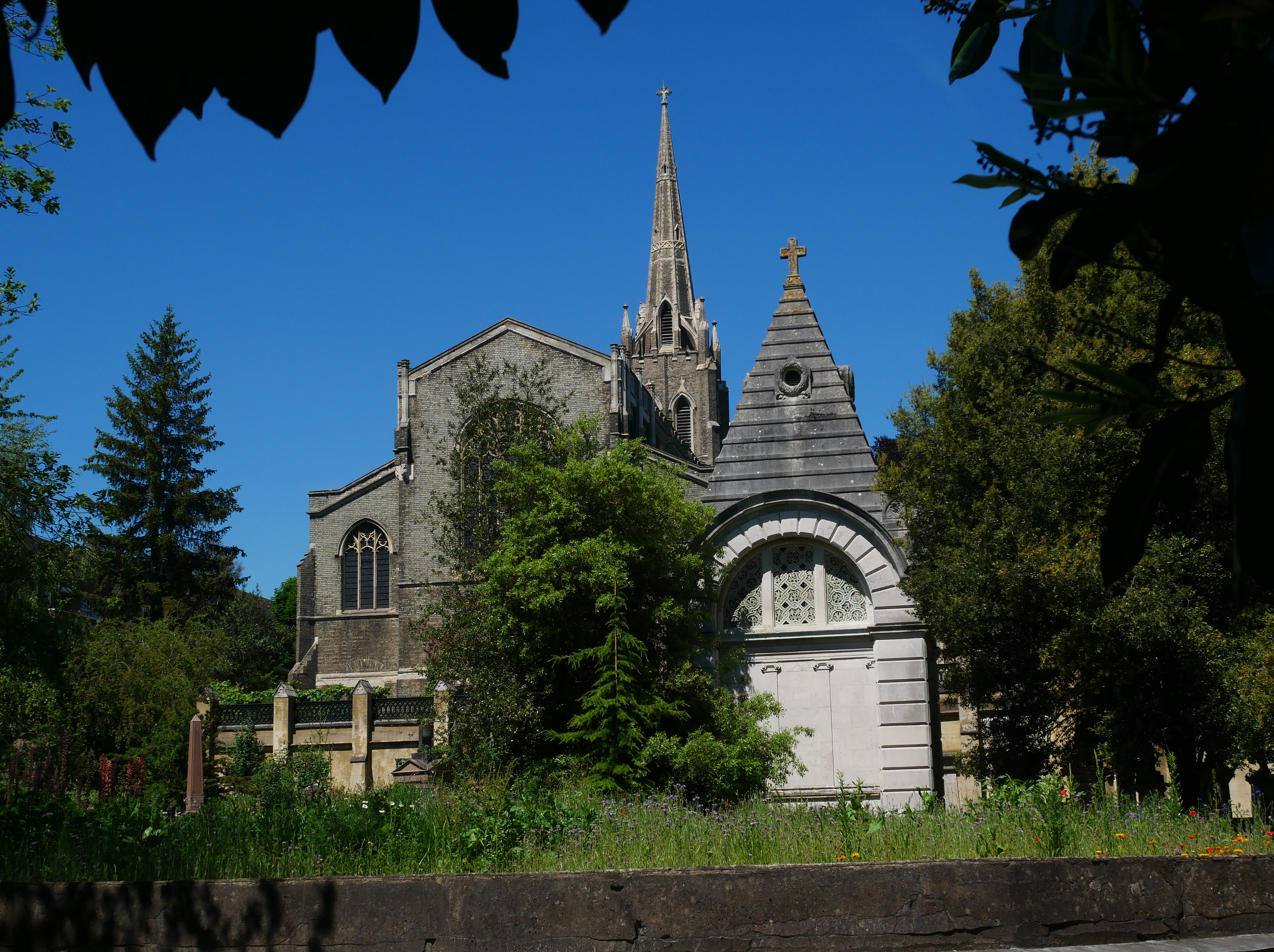
View from Highgate Cemetery

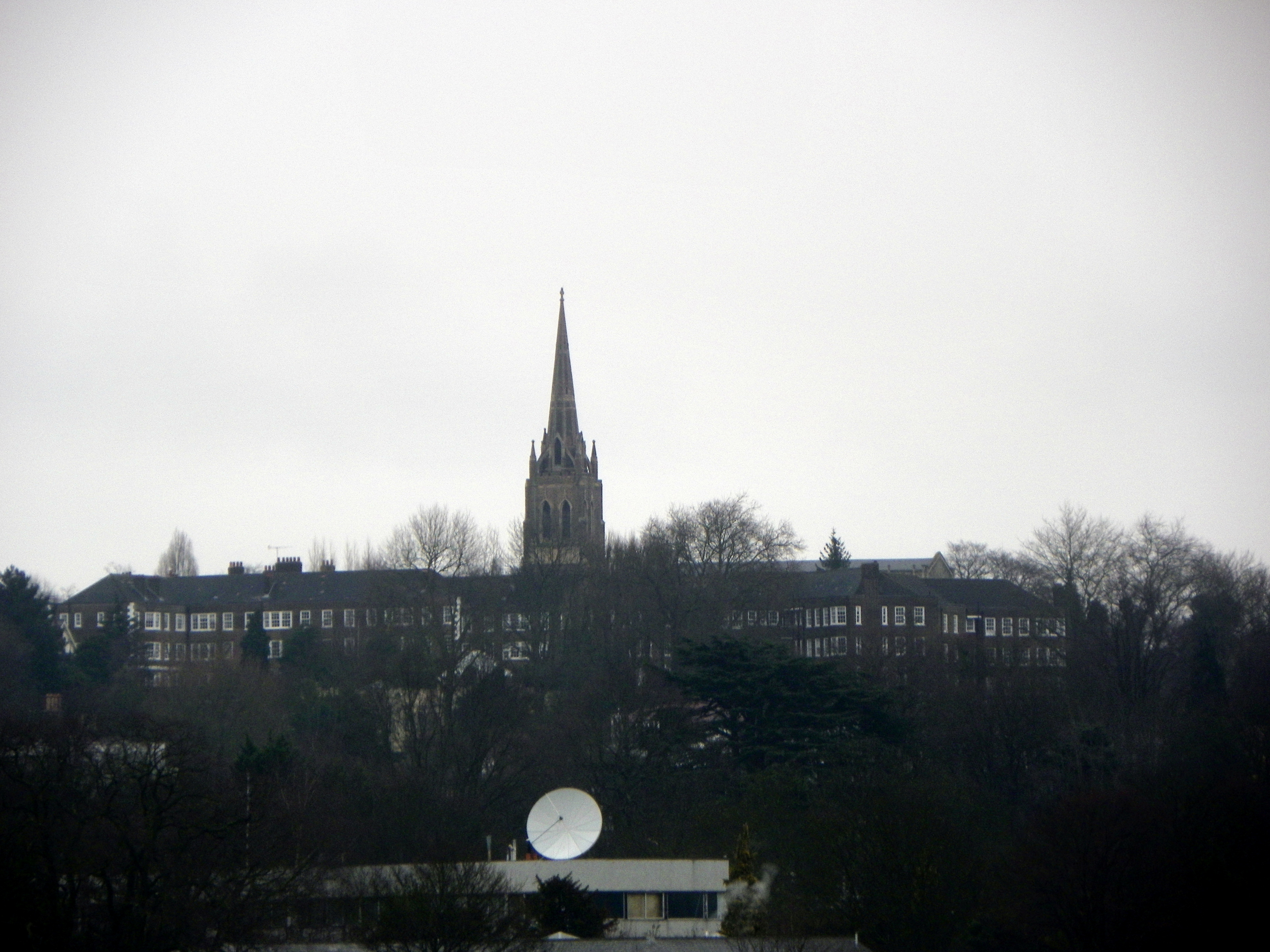
View from Parliament Hill; the spire is visible from a distance, though this image is zoomed in
