= St Paul's Church, Burslem =

Church of St Paul
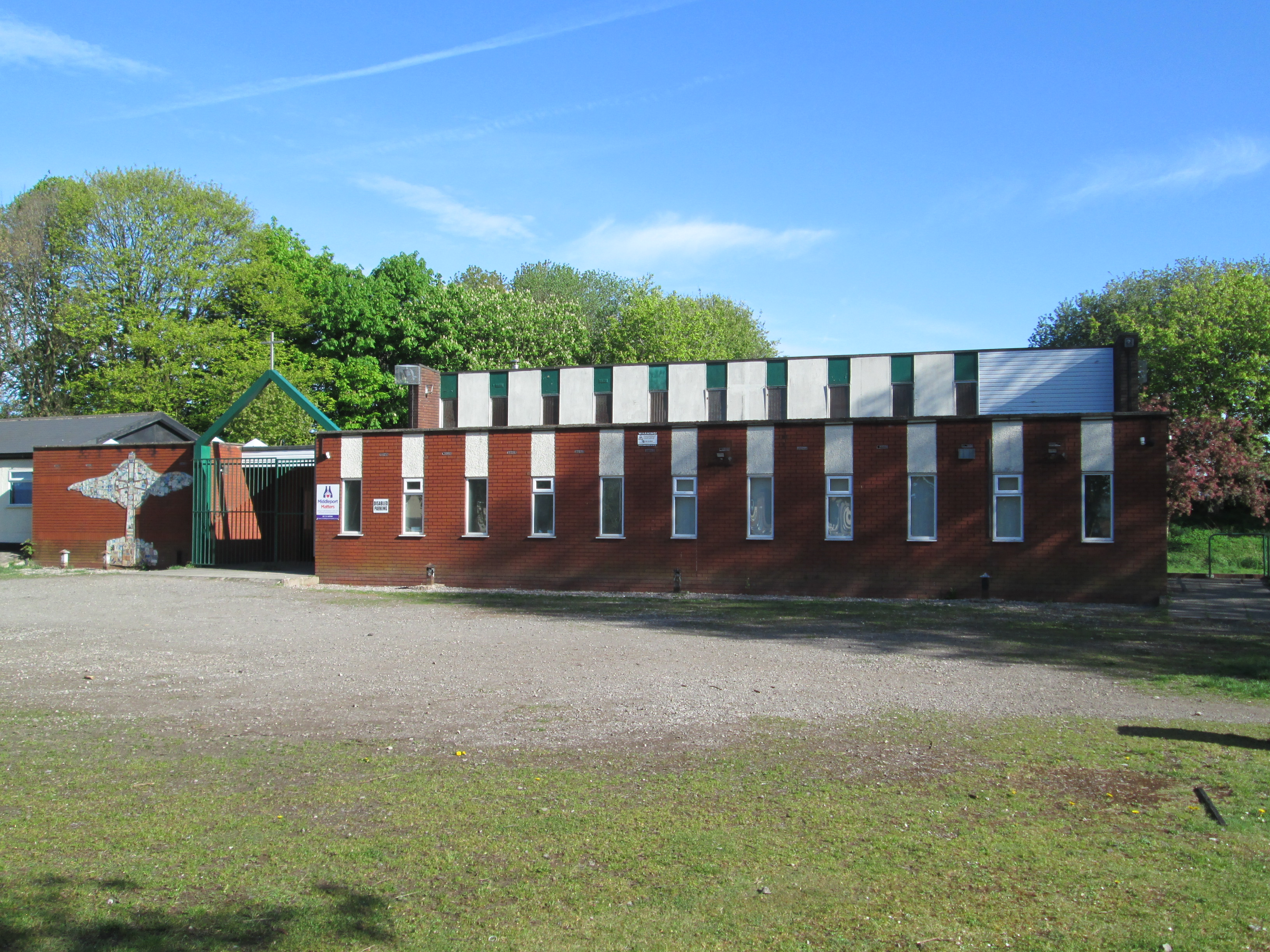
- Church of St Paul
- 53°2′42.76″N 2°12′21.02″W
- OS grid reference: SJ 86297 49789
- Country: England
- Denomination: Church of England
- Website: www.stpaulsburslem.org

Administration
- Diocese: Lichfield

St Paul's Church is an Anglican church in Dale Hall in Burslem, Stoke-on-Trent, England. The original church, built in 1828, was demolished in 1974, and the existing church was later erected on the same site. It is in the Diocese of Lichfield.

== History and description ==
The foundation stone of the original building was laid in 1828, and the church was consecrated in 1831. It was a Commissioners' church, and was a chapel of ease to St John's Church in Burslem.

The architect was Lewis Vulliamy. It was built of Hollington stone, in Perpendicular style, and had about 2,000 sittings. There was a nave of six bays, with aisles and a clerestory; the chancel projected slightly from the east side, and there was a west tower, height 115 feet (35 m), with battlements and pinnacles, containing one bell.

A parish for the church, covering Dale Hall and Longport, was created in 1845 out of the parish of St John.

The condition of the building had deteriorated by 1960, and it was demolished in 1974. During demolition, time capsules were discovered, deposited in wall cavities when the church was built. They had been placed by the pottery manufacturer Enoch Wood, who placed similar mementoes in other new local buildings of his day. About 250 items of pottery from the demolition site were taken to the Potteries Museum & Art Gallery and catalogued.

A smaller building was later erected on the site: there are regular services, and community activities.
