= Dingestow =

Coordinates: 51.79°N 2.79°W

Dingestow: Welsh: Llanddingad
- St Dingad's Church

- Location within Monmouthshire
- OS grid reference: SO457102
- Community: Mitchel Troy
- Principal area: Monmouthshire
- Country: Wales
- Sovereign state: United Kingdom
- Police: Gwent
- Fire: South Wales
- Ambulance: Welsh

Dingestow (pronounced /ˈdɪndʒstoʊ/ DINJ-stoh, Welsh: Llanddingad) is a small village in Monmouthshire, Wales. It is located 4 miles (6.4 km) south-west of Monmouth and approximately the same distance north-east of Raglan in rural Monmouthshire. The River Trothy passes through the village.

== History ==
The village was once the site of a Norman motte and bailey sited to control this part of the Welsh Marches by the incoming Marcher Lords.It was later replaced by a larger, stone-built one, the site of which is the large rectangular mound to the west of the church. This was under construction in 1182 by Ranulf Poer, Sheriff of Herefordshire, when it was attacked by Hywel ap Iorwerth, the Welsh lord of Caerleon, as part of his retaliation for the murder of Seisyll ap Dyfnwal at Abergavenny Castle on Christmas Day in 1175 by William de Braose. The sheriff himself was killed in the action.

The village has a church, dedicated to Saint Dingad or Dingat. The church was rebuilt in several stages in the nineteenth century. Dingestow Court has been described as "one of the county's major houses." The 17th-century gentry house of Treowen, now a venue for conferences and weddings, is located just north-east of the village.

The village was served, from 1857 to 1955, by the Coleford, Monmouth, Usk and Pontypool Railway which had a railway station at Dingestow.

== Amenities ==
The area is popular with campers and caravanners in season and is close to the Wye Valley. The community is served by a Village Hall and a general store with a sub Post Office. The Somerset Arms is the local public house. Seddon House, in the village, is the base for Gwent Wildlife Trust.
