= Dingestow Court =

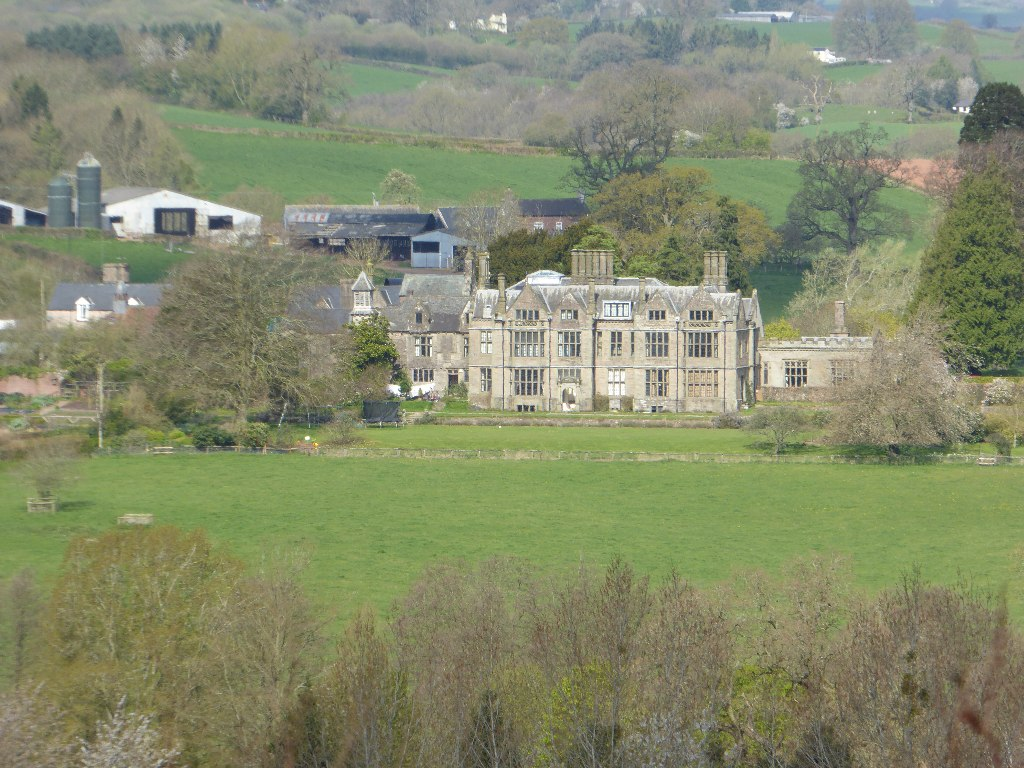
- "one of the county's major houses"

- Location within Monmouthshire
- 51.7834°N 2.7978°W
- Type: House
- Location: Dingestow, Monmouthshire, Wales

History
- Built: c.1600 and 1845-6
- Built for: Samuel Bosanquet

Site notes
- Architect(s): Lewis Vulliamy, Prichard and Seddon, and others
- Architectural style: Tudorbethan
- Governing body: Privately owned

Listed Building – Grade II*
- Official name: Dingestow Court
- Designated: 1 May 1952
- Reference no.: 2061

Cadw/ICOMOS Register of Parks and Gardens of Special Historic Interest in Wales
- Official name: Dingestow Court
- Designated: 1 February 2022
- Reference no.: PGW(Gt)1(Mon)
- Listing: Grade II*

Dingestow Court, at Dingestow, Monmouthshire, Wales, is a Victorian country house with earlier origins and later additions. The architectural historian John Newman describes it as "one of the county's major houses" and Cadw notes its "entertaining confection of styles". The court is a Grade II* listed building.

== History ==
The court has an "unusually complicated building history". Its earliest origins are recorded by the Monmouthshire antiquarian Sir Joseph Bradney as being a manor owned by John ap James, a descendant of Sir Guyan le Grand, "a Norman adventurer who came into Wales at the conquest of Glamorgan". The James family, later Jones, constructed the precursor to the present building in the early sixteenth-century. Part of the gatehouse range of this building survives. The Joneses continued to occupy the court until the deaths in 1789 of Richard Jones, known as "Happy Dick" on account of his "liberality and geniality", and, a few years later, of the last heiress, Mary, who died "a nun at Ghent".

The estate was then bought, and the main house rebuilt by James Duberley. Bradney records that Duberley (whom he dubs Duberly) was the son of a tailor from Monmouth and "amassed a large fortune" as a supplier of clothing to the Army.

In 1801, the estate was acquired by Samuel Bosanquet of Essex. Bradney records that the Bosanquets were French Huguenots who had come to England following the revocation of the Edict of Nantes in 1685 and established themselves as successful bankers. In the mid-nineteenth century, Sir John Bosanquet commissioned Lewis Vulliamy to extend and restore the house. This enlargement was followed, some twenty years later, with limited further additions, although much more extensive plans, by John Prichard and John Pollard Seddon, prepared for Sir John's son, another Samuel. An east wing and interior re-modelling were undertaken, with the kitchen wing being added in 1927.

Dingestow was for a century and a half the home of Brut y Brenhinedd a thirteenth-century Welsh version of Geoffrey of Monmouth's Historia Regum Britanniae, currently deposited at the National Library of Wales, Aberystwyth.

The court remains the private home of the Bosanquets and is not open to the public, although the grounds are occasionally opened for charitable events.

== Architecture and description ==
The varied building history of the court is reflected in its rather disjointed appearance and its "entertaining confection of styles (such as would have warmed the heart of Osbert Lancaster)". Despite this, John Newman still considers it one of Monmouthshire's "most important country houses". Vulliamy's south front is a near copy of that of the mansion of Franks Hall, Horton Kirby, Kent, in a Tudorbethan style. Prichard and Seddon's ambitious plans for Sir John's son, Samuel, came to little, beyond a south-west extension and the stable court. The west front includes the original sixteenth-century gatehouse.

The interior is little more co-ordinated but contains some "significant" nineteenth century rooms. These include the hall, remodelled by Richard Creed in 1888, and the drawing room/library undertaken by Vulliamy in a Jacobethan taste. The dining room is another exercise in historical revivalism, this time with a "Tudor-style" ceiling copied from one in the Queens Head, Monmouth. The house is a Grade II* listed building.

The grounds were laid out by Edward Milner in the nineteenth century. They are a largely complete example of a nineteenth-century park. Bradney describes the pre-Milner gardens as comprising "meadows of considerable extent" which led to a large lake, and records that, during the English Civil War soldiers drained the lake, removing "fish to the value of 50 shillings". The gardens are listed at Grade II on the Register of Parks and Gardens of Special Historic Interest in Wales.

== Sources ==
- Bradney, Joseph (1992). A History of Monmouthshire: The Hundred of Raglan, Volume 2 Part 1. Academy Books. ISBN 1-873361-15-7.
- Newman, John (2000). Gwent/Monmouthshire. The Buildings of Wales. London: Penguin. ISBN 0-14-071053-1.
