= Listed parks and gardens in North West England =

The Register of Historic Parks and Gardens of Special Historic Interest in England, created in 1983, is administered by Historic England. It includes more than 1,600 sites, ranging from gardens of private houses, to cemeteries and public parks.

There are 136 registered parks and gardens in North West England. Five are listed at Grade I, the highest grade, 29 at Grade II*, the middle grade, and 102 at Grade II, the lowest grade.

== Key ==
| Grade | Criteria |
|---|---|
| I | Parks and gardens of exceptional interest, sometimes considered to be internationally important |
| II* | Particularly important parks and gardens of more than special interest |
| II | Parks and gardens of national importance and special interest |

== Parks and gardens ==
=== Cheshire ===
| Name | Grade | Location | Type | Completed (Note: The date given is the date used by Historic England as significant for the initial building or that of an important part in the structure's description.) | Grid ref. (Note: The grid reference is based on the British national grid reference system, sometimes known as OSGB36, used by the Ordnance Survey.) Geo-coordinates | Entry number (Note: The "List Entry Number" is a unique number assigned to each listed building and scheduled monument by Historic England.) | Image |
|---|---|---|---|---|---|---|---|
| Adlington Hall | II* | Adlington | Garden | 1760 | SJ9017080381 | 1000636 | Adlington Hall |
| Arley Hall | II* | Aston by Budworth | Garden | 1852 | SJ 67794 80198 | 1000637 | Arley Hall |
| Burton Manor | II | Neston | Garden | 1900s | SJ 31364 73843 | 1001422 | Burton Manor |
| Castle Park House | II | Frodsham | Garden | 1855 | SJ 51503 77424 | 1001622 | Castle Park House |
| Cholmondeley Castle | II | Cholmondeley | Garden | Late 18th century | SJ 54447 51391 | 1000638 | Cholmondeley Castle |
| Combermere Abbey | II | Marbury cum Quoisley | Garden | 18th century | SJ 58866 44077 | 1000639 | Combermere Abbey |
| Congleton Park | II | Congleton | Park | 1871 | SJ 86174 63413 | 1001530 | Congleton Park More images |
| Crewe Hall | II | Crewe Green | Garden | 1860s | SJ7337054317 | 1000124 | Crewe Hall |
| Doddington Hall | II | Bridgemere | Garden | 1770 | SJ7099146760 | 1000640 | Doddington Hall |
| Dorfold Hall | II | Nantwich | Garden | Mid-19th century | SJ6329852258 | 1000641 | Dorfold Hall |
| Eaton Hall | II* | Claverton | Garden | 1911 | SJ3974761954 | 1000127 | Eaton Hall |
| Gawsworth Old Hall | II* | Gawsworth | Garden | 1600 | SJ 88771 69615 | 1000539 | Gawsworth Old Hall More images |
| Grosvenor Park | II* | Chester | Park | 1867 | SJ4114466231 | 1001577 | Grosvenor Park |
| Lyme Park | II* | Pott Shrigley | Garden | 19th century | SJ 96278 82284 | 1000642 | Lyme Park More images |
| Mellor's Gardens | II | Rainow | Garden | 1840s | SJ 94670 76338 | 1001284 | Upload Photo |
| Ness Botanic Gardens | II | Neston | Botanic gardens | 1996 | SJ 30467 75564 | 1001364 | Ness Botanic Gardens More images |
| Overleigh Cemetery | II | Chester | Cemetery | 1850 | SJ 40290 65345 | 1001607 | Overleigh Cemetery |
| Peover Hall | II | Peover Superior | Garden | 1905 | SJ 77411 73273 | 1000643 | Peover Hall |
| Queen's Park | II* | Crewe | Park | 1887 | SJ 68728 55628 | 1001412 | Queen's Park |
| Rode Hall | II | Odd Rode | Garden | 1861 | SJ8163857529 | 1000644 | Rode Hall |
| Tabley House | II | Tabley Superior | Garden | Mid-19th century | SJ7234577731 | 1000645 | Tabley House |
| Tatton Park | II* | Mobberley | Garden | 1750 | SJ 75345 81106 | 1000501 | Tatton Park |
| Tirley Garth | II | Willington | Garden | Early 20th century | SJ 54605 66382 | 1001593 | Tirley Garth |
| West Park | II | Macclesfield | Park | 1854 | SJ 91047 74057 | 1001495 | West Park More images |

=== Cumbria ===
| Name | Grade | Location | Type | Completed | Grid ref. Geo-coordinates | Entry number | Image |
|---|---|---|---|---|---|---|---|
| Appleby Castle | II* | Appleby-in-Westmorland | Garden | Late 17th century | NY 68544 19987 | 1000659 | Appleby Castle |
| Askham Hall | II | Askham | Garden | 18th century | NY 51630 23901 | 1000660 | Askham Hall |
| Barrow Park | II | Barrow-in-Furness | Park | 1915 | SD2048469817 | 1437665 | Barrow Park |
| Belle Isle | II* | Windermere | Garden | 1780s | SD 39377 96647 | 1000661 | Belle Isle |
| Blackwell | II | Windermere | Garden | 1900 | SD 40010 94546 | 1001553 | Blackwell |
| Brockhole | II | Lakes | Garden | 1904 | NY 38901 00908 | 1001463 | Brockhole |
| Corby Castle | I | Wetheral | Garden | 1739 | NY 47275 53812 | 1000662 | Corby Castle |
| Dalemain | II* | Dacre | Garden | 18th century | NY4753626977 | 1000663 | Dalemain |
| Dallam Tower | II | Beetham | Garden | 19th century | SD 49190 80818 | 1000664 | Dallam Tower |
| Dalston Road Cemetery | II | Carlisle | Cemetery | 1855 | NY 39045 54170 | 1001613 | Dalston Road Cemetery |
| Graythwaite Hall | II* | Ulverston | Garden | 1895 | SD3707891304 | 1466895 | Graythwaite Hall |
| Holker Hall | II | Lower Holker | Garden | 19th century | SD 35375 77272 | 1000665 | Holker Hall More images |
| Hutton in the Forest | II | Catterlen | Garden | 19th century | NY4613936418 | 1000666 | Hutton in the Forest |
| The Image Garden | II | Reagill | Garden | 1865 | NY 60391 17608 | 1000670 | The Image Garden |
| Levens Hall | I | Sedgwick | Garden | 1712 | SD 49886 85378 | 1000667 | Levens Hall |
| Lowther Castle | II | Lowther | Garden | Early 19th century | NY5224623583 | 1000668 | Lowther Castle |
| Muncaster Castle | II* | Muncaster | Garden | 18th century | SD1001596466 | 1000669 | Muncaster Castle |
| Queen's Garden | II | Sedbergh | Memorial garden | 1902 | SD6500691769 | 1400679 | Upload Photo |
| Rickerby Park | II | Carlisle | Memorial gardens | 1922 | NY4074156853 | 1448365 | Rickerby Park More images |
| Rydal Hall | II* | Lakes | Garden | 1909 | NY 36791 05950 | 1000671 | Rydal Hall |
| Rydal Mount | II | Lakes | Garden | 1850 | NY 36379 06223 | 1000672 | Rydal Mount |
| Sizergh Castle | II | Helsington | Garden | 1926 | SD 49904 87815 | 1000673 | Sizergh Castle |
| Workington Hall | II | Workington | Garden | 1780s | NY 01096 28851 | 1001262 | Workington Hall |

=== Greater Manchester ===
| Name | Grade | Location | Type | Completed | Grid ref. Geo-coordinates | Entry number | Image |
|---|---|---|---|---|---|---|---|
| Alexandra Park | II | Manchester | Park | 1870 | SJ 83588 94979 | 1001330 | Alexandra Park |
| Alexandra Park | II* | Oldham | Park | 1865 | SD 93190 04058 | 1001338 | Alexandra Park |
| Broadfield Park | II | Rochdale | Park | 1874 | SD 89516 12988 | 1001522 | Broadfield Park |
| Buile Hill Park | II | Salford | Park | 1876 | SJ 79921 99370 | 1001537 | Buile Hill Park |
| Chadderton Cemetery | II | Chadderton | Cemetery | 1857 | SD 90233 05805 | 1001608 | Chadderton Cemetery |
| Cheadle Royal Hospital | II | Stockport | Hospital grounds | 1849 | SJ 85328 86442 | 1001337 | Cheadle Royal Hospital |
| Dunham Massey | II* | Dunham Massey | Garden | 19th century | SJ 73815 87019 | 1000853 | Dunham Massey |
| Falinge Park | II | Rochdale | Park | 1906 | SD 89164 14158 | 1001521 | Falinge Park |
| Farnworth Park | II | Farnworth | Park | 1864 | SD 73600 06106 | 1001540 | Farnworth Park |
| Greenacres Cemetery | II | Oldham | Cemetery | 1857 | SD 94726 05272 | 1001609 | Greenacres Cemetery |
| Heaton Park | II | Manchester | Park | 19th century | SD8274504249 | 1000854 | Heaton Park |
| Hulton Park | II | Bolton | Garden | Early 19th century | SD 68096 05071 | 1001581 | Hulton Park |
| Manchester General Cemetery | II | Manchester | Cemetery | 1837 | SD 85490 01115 | 1001664 | Manchester General Cemetery |
| Mesnes Park | II | Wigan | Park | 1878 | SD 57905 06377 | 1001335 | Mesnes Park |
| Philips Park | II | Manchester | Park | 1846 | SJ 87175 99056 | 1001531 | Philips Park |
| Philips Park Cemetery | II | Manchester | Cemetery | 1867 | SJ 87228 99331 | 1001634 | Philips Park Cemetery |
| Queen's Park | II | Bolton | Park | 1866 | SD 70617 09291 | 1001390 | Queen's Park |
| Queen's Park | II | Manchester | Park | 1846 | SD 85432 00889 | 1001523 | Queen's Park |
| Queen's Park | II | Heywood | Park | 1879 | SD 85928 11565 | 1001541 | Queen's Park |
| Rochdale Cemetery | II | Rochdale | Cemetery | 1855 | SD 87901 13141 | 1001565 | Rochdale Cemetery |
| Sale and Brooklands Cemetery | II | Sale | Cemetery | 1862 | SJ 78389 91365 | 1001563 | Sale and Brooklands Cemetery |
| Smithills Hall | II | Bolton | Garden | Late 19th century | SD 70011 12030 | 1001442 | Smithills Hall |
| Southern Cemetery | II | Manchester | Cemetery | 1879 | SJ 82847 92536 | 1001656 | Southern Cemetery |
| Stamford Park | II | Altrincham | Park | 1880 | SJ 77387 87530 | 1001508 | Stamford Park |
| Stamford Park | II | Stalybridge | Park | 1873 | SJ 95496 99023 | 1000856 | Stamford Park |
| Tonge Cemetery | II | Bolton | Cemetery | 1856 | SD 73050 09011 | 1001660 | Tonge Cemetery |
| Vernon Park | II | Stockport | Park | 1858 | SJ 90788 90672 | 1001308 | Vernon Park |
| Weaste Cemetery | II | Weaste | Cemetery | 1857 | SJ 79989 97904 | 1001566 | Weaste Cemetery |
| Wythenshawe Park | II | Wythenshawe | Park | 1830 | SJ 81763 89757 | 1000857 | Wythenshawe Park |

=== Lancashire ===
| Name | Grade | Location | Type | Completed | Grid ref. Geo-coordinates | Entry number | Image |
|---|---|---|---|---|---|---|---|
| Ashton Memorial Gardens and Williamson Park | II | Lancaster | Park | 1881 | SD 48855 61214 | 1000942 | Ashton Memorial Gardens and Williamson Park |
| Ashton Gardens | II | Lytham St Anne's | Park | 1916 | SD 31970 29058 | 1001377 | Ashton Gardens |
| Astley Hall | II | Astley Village | Garden | 18th century | SD 57524 17992 | 1000943 | Astley Hall |
| Avenham Park | II* | Preston | Park | 1861 | SD 53974 28746 | 1000944 | Avenham Park |
| Avenham Walk | II | Preston | Park | 1728 | SD 54081 28836 | 1001451 | Avenham Walk |
| Bold Venture Park | II | Darwen | Park | 1889 | SD 68694 21600 | 1001354 | Bold Venture Park |
| Capernwray Hall | II | Arkholme-with-Cawood | Garden | 1901 | SD 54467 72145 | 1000945 | Capernwray Hall |
| Clitheroe Castle | II | Clitheroe | Park | 1920s | SD 74121 41562 | 1001361 | Clitheroe Castle |
| Corporation Park | II* | Blackburn | Park | 1857 | SD 67409 28990 | 1001344 | Corporation Park |
| Fleetwood Memorial Park | II | Fleetwood | Memorial garden | 1926 | SD3287547393 | 1402219 | Fleetwood Memorial Park |
| Gawthorpe Hall | II | Ightenhill | Garden | 1856 | SD 80543 33688 | 1000946 | Gawthorpe Hall |
| Gisburne Park | II | Horton | Garden | 18th century | SD8256948986 | 1400674 | Gisburne Park |
| Harris Orphanage (former) | II | Preston | Orphanage grounds | 1888 | SD 53018 32286 | 1001570 | Upload Photo |
| Haslam Park | II | Ingol and Tanterton | Park | 1910 | SD 51634 31118 | 1001458 | Haslam Park |
| Hoghton Tower | II | Hoghton | Garden | 17th century | SD 62086 26467 | 1000947 | Hoghton Tower |
| Lancaster Cemetery | II | Lancaster | Cemetery | 1855 | SD 49193 61858 | 1001567 | Lancaster Cemetery |
| Lever Park | II | Rivington | Park | 1911 | SD 63257 13280 | 1000948 | Lever Park |
| Lytham Hall | II | Westby-with-Plumptons | Garden | Early 19th century | SD 35939 28640 | 1000949 | Lytham Hall |
| Miller Park | II* | Preston | Park | 1864 | SD 53446 28672 | 1001450 | Miller Park |
| The Mount | II | Fleetwood | Garden | 1860s | SD 33363 48193 | 1001708 | The Mount |
| Preston Cemetery | II | Preston | Cemetery | 1855 | SD 56499 30381 | 1001617 | Preston Cemetery |
| Promenade Gardens | II | Lytham St Anne's | Park | 1914 | SD 32124 28333 | 1001491 | Promenade Gardens |
| Queen's Park | II | Blackburn | Park | 1887 | SD 69741 27229 | 1001498 | Queen's Park |
| Queen's Park | II | Burnley | Park | 1893 | SD 84929 33364 | 1001539 | Queen's Park |
| Rivington Gardens | II | Rivington | Garden | 1922 | SD 63823 14033 | 1000950 | Rivington Gardens More images |
| Scarisbrick Hall | II | Scarisbrick | Garden | Mid-19th century | SD3860112573 | 1000951 | Scarisbrick Hall |
| Scott Park | II | Burnley | Park | 1895 | SD 83196 31658 | 1001533 | Scott Park |
| Stanley Park | II* | Blackpool | Park | 1926 | SD 32694 35791 | 1000952 | Stanley Park |
| Stonyhurst College | II* | Aighton | Garden | 1700 | SD 68637 38862 | 1000953 | Stonyhurst College |
| Sunnyhurst Wood | II | Darwen | Park | 1903 | SD 67669 22747 | 1001358 | Sunnyhurst Wood |
| Thompson Park | II | Burnley | Park | 1930 | SD 84502 33219 | 1001496 | Thompson Park |
| Towneley Hall | II | Burnley | Garden | Late 18th century | SD 85606 31038 | 1000954 | Towneley Hall |
| Whitehall Park | II | Darwen | Park | 1879 | SD 69493 19991 | 1001359 | Upload Photo |
| Whitworth Cemetery | II | Whitworth | Cemetery | 1879 | SD 89233 18965 | 1000475 | Whitworth Cemetery |
| The Willows | II | Preston | Garden | 1912 | SD 51329 29916 | 1001327 | The Willows |
| Woodfold Park | II | Pleasington | Garden | 1790s | SD 64142 28441 | 1001341 | Woodfold Park |
| Worden Hall | II | Leyland | Garden | Late 19th century | SD5351921076 | 1000955 | Worden Hall |

=== Merseyside ===
| Name | Grade | Location | Type | Completed | Grid ref. Geo-coordinates | Entry number | Image |
|---|---|---|---|---|---|---|---|
| Allerton Cemetery | II | Garston | Cemetery | 1909 | SJ 41676 85168 | 1001636 | Allerton Cemetery |
| Anfield Cemetery | II* | Liverpool | Cemetery | 1863 | SJ 36504 93929 | 1000993 | Anfield Cemetery |
| Birkenhead Park | I | Birkenhead | Park | 1847 | SJ3031889119 | 1000994 | Birkenhead Park |
| Borough Cemetery | II | St Helens | Cemetery | 1858 | SJ 49833 96991 | 1001662 | Borough Cemetery |
| Churchtown Botanic Gardens | II | Southport | Park | 1875 | SD 36754 18818 | 1000995 | Churchtown Botanic Gardens |
| Croxteth Hall Park | II | Knowsley | Gardens | Early 19th century | SJ 41487 94292 | 1001304 | Croxteth Hall Park |
| The Dell, The Diamond and The Causeway | II | Port Sunlight | Park | 1914 | SJ 33672 84488 | 1001637 | The Dell, The Diamond and The Causeway |
| Derby Park | II | Bootle | Park | 1895 | SJ 35004 95419 | 1001642 | Derby Park |
| Flaybrick Memorial Gardens | II* | Birkenhead | Cemetery | 1864 | SJ 29277 89457 | 1001564 | Flaybrick Memorial Gardens |
| Hesketh Park | II* | Southport | Park | 1868 | SD 34814 18215 | 1000996 | Hesketh Park |
| Ince Blundell Hall | II* | Ince Blundell | Garden | 1786 | SD 32970 02641 | 1000492 | Ince Blundell Hall |
| King's Gardens and South Marine Gardens | II | Southport | Park | 1887 | SD 33226 17421 | 1001535 | King's Gardens and South Marine Gardens |
| Knowsley Park | II | Knowsley | Garden | 1770s | SJ 45296 94884 | 1000997 | Knowsley Park |
| Newsham Park | II | Liverpool | Park | 1865 | SJ 37707 91881 | 1001536 | Newsham Park |
| Pilkingtons Headquarters complex (former) | II | St Helens | Office grounds | 1963 | SJ4987794600 | 1412004 | Pilkingtons Headquarters complex (former) |
| Prince's Park | II* | Liverpool | Park | 1842 | SJ 36626 88064 | 1000998 | Prince's Park |
| Sefton Park | I | Liverpool | Park | 1867 | SJ 37652 87623 | 1000999 | Sefton Park |
| St James's Gardens | I | Liverpool | Cemetery | 1829 | SJ 35435 89348 | 1001585 | St James's Gardens |
| Stanley Park | II* | Liverpool | Park | 1870 | SJ 36196 93581 | 1001000 | Stanley Park |
| Taylor Park | II | St Helens | Park | 1893 | SJ 49275 94711 | 1001632 | Taylor Park |
| Thornton Manor | II* | Thornton Hough | Garden | 1914 | SJ 29616 81660 | 1001001 | Thornton Manor |
| Toxteth Park Cemetery | II | Liverpool | Cemetery | 1856 | SJ 37539 88942 | 1001611 | Toxteth Park Cemetery |
| Wavertree Botanic Garden and Park | II* | Liverpool | Park | 1856 | SJ3749690349 | 1001538 | Wavertree Botanic Garden and Park |
