= Park Hotel, Preston =

East Cliff County Offices
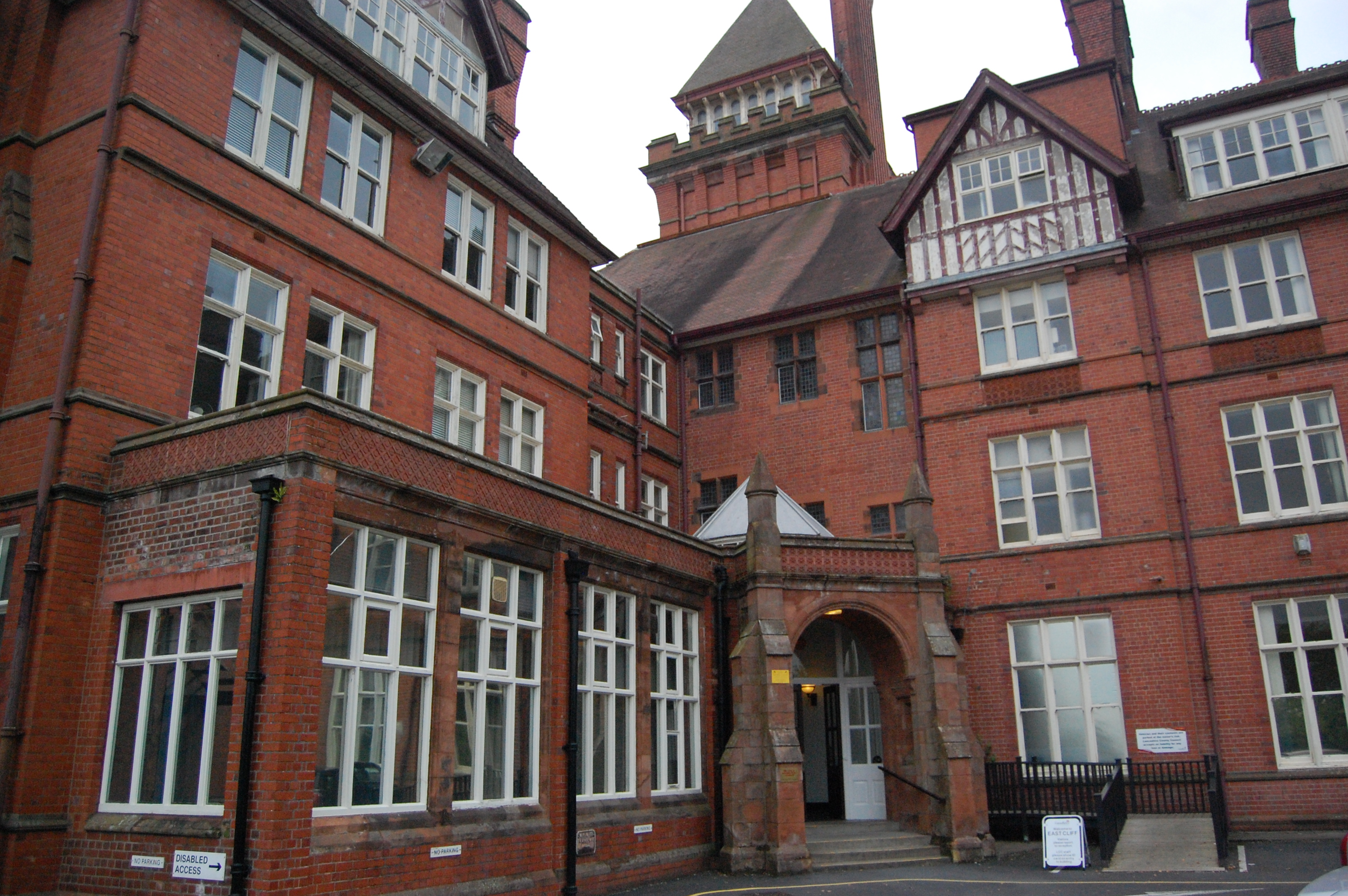
- The main entrance and frontage, facing the railway station, in September 2014

- Location within Preston city centre
- Former names: Park Hotel

General information
- Status: Completed
- Type: Offices, former railway hotel
- Location: East Cliff, Preston, England
- Coordinates: 53.7527°N 2.7054°W
- Opened: 1883
- Owner: Lancashire County Council

Technical details
- Material: Red brick

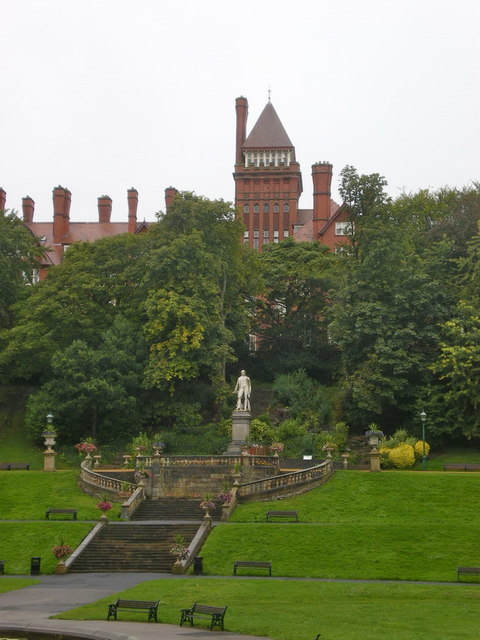
View from Miller Park

The Park Hotel was a railway-owned hotel at East Cliff, Preston, Lancashire, England, used for many years as offices, but now being restored as a hotel.

The hotel opened in 1883 and was operated jointly by the Lancashire and Yorkshire Railway and London and North Western Railway. In the 1923 grouping of railway companies, ownership passed to the London, Midland and Scottish Railway. When the UK's railways were nationalised in 1948, it passed to the British Transport Commission's Hotels Executive, and thence to British Transport Hotels, who sold it in 1950. It has subsequently been, and as of September 2014 remains, used as offices, and renamed "East Cliff County Offices", by Lancashire County Council, who also had a modern annexe, adjacent.

Located on a small hill, the red-brick building overlooks Preston railway station, on the West Coast Main Line, to its north-west and Miller Park and the River Ribble to its south-east. In its heyday, the hotel was connected to the southern end of the main south-bound platform (the modern-day platform 4) at Preston station by a covered footbridge

Various pre-1923 objects from the hotel are in the National Railway Museum at York. These include Mappin & Webb cutlery and Elkington & Co. tableware and candlesticks, the latter marked with the initials "P.P." and a lamb and flag, the coat of arms of the city.

The historic hotel structure was used for many decades as an office building for the Lancashire County Council, along with an adjoining tower block, constructed in the 1960s. In 2020, the tower block was demolished as part of a plan by the Council to restore the hotel to operation.
