= Hurst Green, Lancashire =

Village in Lancashire, England

Coordinates: 53.836°N 2.480°W

Hurst Green
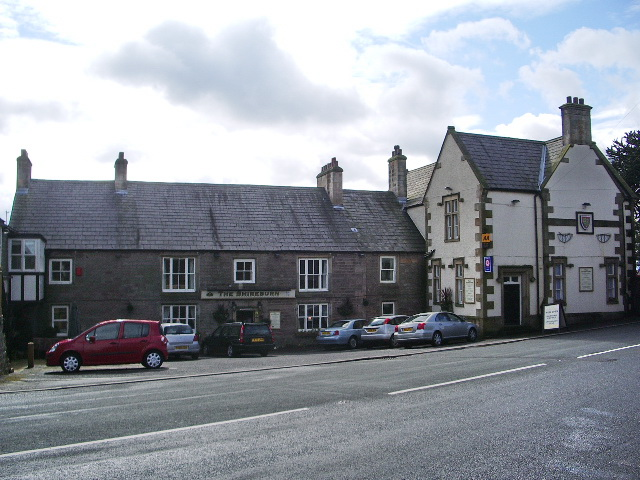
- The Shireburn public house and hotel

- Location in Ribble Valley Borough Location in the Forest of Bowland Location within Lancashire
- OS grid reference: SD684379
- Civil parish: Aighton, Bailey and Chaigley
- District: Ribble Valley
- Shire county: Lancashire
- Region: North West
- Country: England
- Sovereign state: United Kingdom
- Post town: CLITHEROE
- Postcode district: BB7
- Dialling code: 01254
- Police: Lancashire
- Fire: Lancashire
- Ambulance: North West
- UK Parliament: Ribble Valley

Hurst Green is a village in the civil parish of Aighton, Bailey and Chaigley, in the Ribble Valley district of Lancashire, England, connected in its history to the Jesuit school, Stonyhurst College. The village is 5 miles (8 km) from Longridge and 4 miles (6 km) from Clitheroe, and is close to the River Ribble, near its junction with the River Hodder.

== History ==
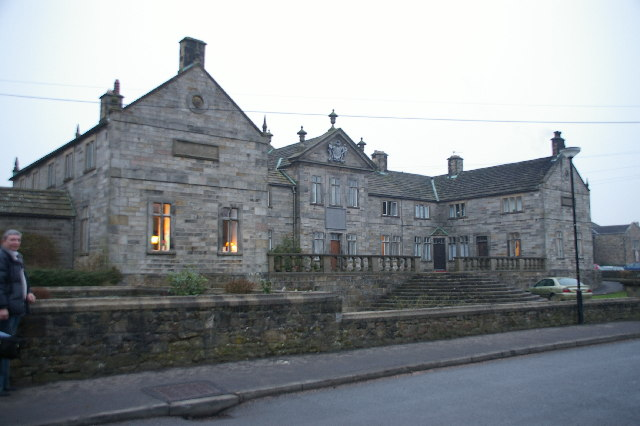
Shireburn Cottages, 18th century almshouses

With the founding of Stonyhurst Hall, by Richard Shireburn in 1592, the hamlet of Hurst Green (about a mile away) began to develop, as often happened after the building of manor houses. The hamlet's development continued once the college was founded in 1794, and by the early 20th century the village was about the size it is now (approximately 500 residents).

There is a distinctive war memorial to the First and Second World Wars bearing the names of soldiers from the area who died. This is situated near the village green. At the other side of the green stands St Peter's Guild Club, a Catholic social club which has existed for well over 200 years.

Shireburn donated the impressive and distinctive almshouses to the village. These almshouses were originally on Longridge Fell but moved to Avenue Road.

The presence of at least two old bobbin mills bear witness to the small cotton industry that existed here. However, Hurst Green is a community now mainly based on farming and tourism - with some people working at the local college and many more commuting to local towns.

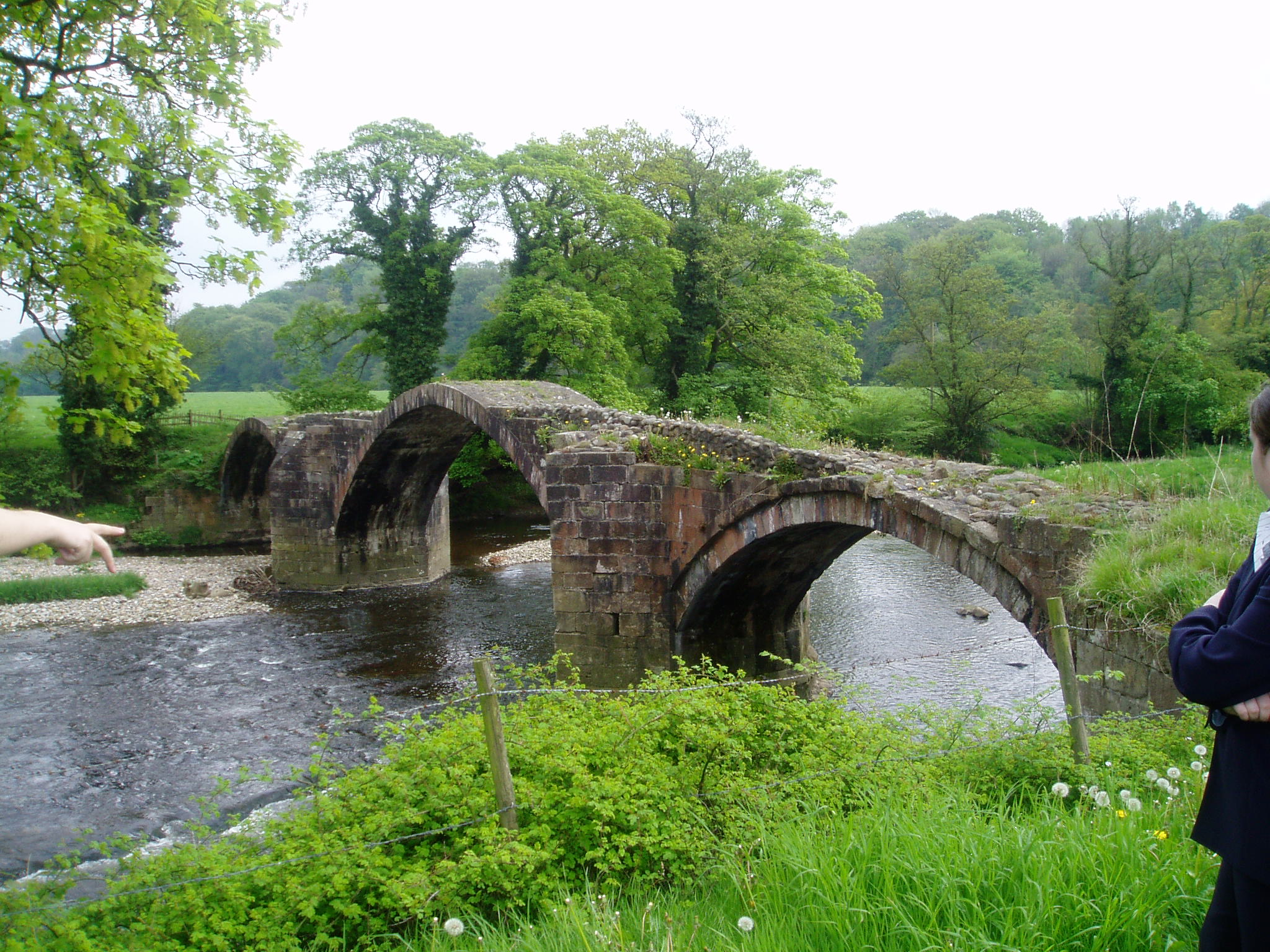
Cromwell's Bridge, on the River Hodder near Hurst Green

In the 1970s the village had three shops, but these have closed over the last few years. However, as of 2021 there is a village cafe, Millie's, open from Tuesday-Sunday which provides meals and has a small grocery section. There is a large village hall, St Peter's Catholic Church at Stonyhurst College, the Anglican church of St. John the Evangelist, village pubs, St Peter's Guild Club and the local football club.

== Schools ==
In the village is St Joseph's Roman Catholic Primary School which, like Stonyhurst College, is a Jesuit school. Founded by Richard Shireburn it operates today under the aegis of the Diocese of Salford whilst being maintained by Lancashire County Council. It is a feeder school for St Augustine's RC High School, Billington and St Cecilia's RC High School, Longridge. The school teaches boys and girls from the ages of 5 to 11 years old. Within it is a pre-school that takes children from the ages of 3 to 5 years old. It is reputed to be the oldest and smallest Jesuit school in the UK.

== Hotels and public houses ==
The village has a hotel and public house called the Shireburn, named after the Shireburn family.

== Famous people from Hurst Green ==
Will Greenwood - England World Cup winning rugby union player was brought up on Smithy Row, Hurst Green, by Sue and Dick Greenwood; the latter was also an England rugby international.

== Transport links ==
The Old Lower Hodder Bridge was built in 1562 by Richard Shireburn, constructed by local stonemason Richard Crossley. Oliver Cromwell and the Parliamentary Army held a war council at the bridge, on their way to the Battle of Preston in 1648 and the bridge then became known as "Cromwell's Bridge". It is parallel to the New Lower Hodder Bridge, a large bridge which carries the B6243 road over the river and which dates from the early 1800s.

There is a bus service connecting Hurst Green to both Longridge and Clitheroe, running in each direction approximately 12 times a day as at summer 2021. In 2016 Lancashire County Council proposed the closing of the bus service. However, this proposal was scrapped due to public reaction.

== Sport ==
The second stage of the Tour of Britain Women's cycle race passed through Hurst Green in 2026.

== See also ==
- Listed buildings in Aighton, Bailey and Chaigley
- Stonyhurst College
- Punch Bowl, Lancashire
