= Listed buildings in Aighton, Bailey and Chaigley =

Aighton, Bailey and Chaigley is a civil parish in Ribble Valley, Lancashire, England. It contains 55 listed buildings that are recorded in the National Heritage List for England. Of these, three are listed at Grade I, the highest of the three grades, five are at Grade II*, the middle grade, and the others are at Grade II, the lowest grade. The most important building in the parish is Stonyhurst College; many of the buildings comprising the college and associated with it are listed. The parish contains the village of Hurst Green, which also contains listed buildings, including houses, public houses, and almshouses. Outside these areas the listed buildings include other houses and associated structures, farmhouses and farm buildings, crosses, the ruins of a chapel, bridges, a mausoleum, a church, and a vicarage.

== Key ==
| Grade | Criteria |
|---|---|
| I | Buildings of exceptional interest, sometimes considered to be internationally important |
| II* | Particularly important buildings of more than special interest |
| II | Buildings of national importance and special interest |

== Buildings ==
| Name and location | Photograph | Date | Notes | Grade |
|---|---|---|---|---|
| Cross of St. Paulinus; 53.85921°N 2.47823°W | — | 10th or 11th century (possible) | The cross is in sandstone. It has a roughly square base with a socket, and stands on two squared boulders. There is a short shaft that branches into a Y-shape. | II |
| Remains of St John's Chapel; 53.83161°N 2.49011°W | — | c. 1338 | All that remains are parts of the north and east walls, with a maximum height of about 5 feet (1.5 m). They are in sandstone on a weathered plinth with diagonal buttresses. | II |
| Barn, Bailey Hall; 53.83096°N 2.49107°W | — | 16th century (possible) | The barn is cruck-framed with sandstone walls dating probably from the 19th century, and a slate roof. It contains a wide entrance, doorways, windows, and pitching holes. Inside are three cruck trusses. | II |
| Northwest Barn, Hall Barns Farm; 53.84452°N 2.46839°W | — | 16th century (possible) | A cruck-framed barn, originally with timber-framed walls, later encased in sandstone, and with a slate roof. In the south wall is a wide entrance with a segmental head, a doorway, and a window. The north wall contains ventilation slits. Inside are five cruck trusses. | II* |
| Old Bridge; 53.84779°N 2.45129°W | | 1562 | A disused bridge crossing the River Hodder, it is in sandstone, and consists of three segmental arches, the middle arch being the widest. It has triangular cutwaters, but no parapet. The bridge is also a scheduled monument. | II* |
| Old Quadrangle, Stonyhurst College; 53.84680°N 2.47222°W | | 1592 | A Roman Catholic boarding school, restored and expanded in the 19th century, built in sandstone with slate roofs. The buildings enclose a rectangular quadrangle. In the centre of the entrance range is a four-stage gatehouse with a semicircular archway with iron gates, a battlemented parapet, and flanked at the rear by octagonal stair turrets. The gatehouse is flanked by ranges with three storeys and four bays. Most of the windows in all the ranges are mullioned or mullioned and transomed. Incorporated in the quadrangle is the Sodality Chapel that has a canted apse. | I |
| Greengore; 53.84547°N 2.49738°W | — | c. 1600 | A sandstone house with a stone-slate roof in two storeys with attics. The house is supported by large buttresses. The windows are mullioned or mullioned and transomed, and there are blocked chamfered doorways, some with four-centred heads, and one with a moulded hood. Inside the house is a bressumer. | II* |
| Bailey Hall; 53.83120°N 2.49000°W | — | 17th century | A stone house with a slate roof, in two storeys with an attic. It has a T-shaped plan, with the south wing probably added in the 18th century. The windows vary, some being mullioned, some transomed, some mullioned and transomed, and other are cross windows. There is a doorway with a chamfered surround and a four-centred head. | II |
| The Flat; 53.84564°N 2.49764°W | — | 17th century | Originally a farm building, later converted into a cottage, it is in sandstone with a modern tile roof. It has a single storey with an attic, and contains doorways with plain surrounds. There are mullioned windows, a pitching hole, and a ventilation slit. | II |
| Woodfields Farmhouse; 53.84912°N 2.46433°W | — | 17th century | The farmhouse is in sandstone, partly rendered, with a slate roof, and is in two storeys. Some of the windows are mullioned, some are mullioned and transomed, and others are sashes. There is a two-storey gabled porch that has a doorway with a plain surround and a triangular moulded head. Inside the house is a bressumer. | II |
| Bailey House; 53.83743°N 2.49737°W | — | Late 17th century (probable) | A sandstone house with a stone-slate roof in two storeys. It has a main range, a cross wing on the right, and at the rear is a lower, later wing. In the main range is a doorway with a moulded surround and hood. The first floor windows are mullioned, the other windows have been altered. | II |
| Jumbles; 53.83513°N 2.45407°W | — | Late 17th century (probable) | A sandstone house, partly rendered, in two storeys with attics. It consists of an east wing with a west cross wing, and there are lean-to extensions at the rear. The windows are mullioned, and the doorway has a plain surround. On the east wing is an inscribed plaque. | II |
| Trough House; 53.82634°N 2.47758°W | — | Late 17th century (probable) | The house is in pebbledashed stone with a slate roof in two storeys. It has a doorway with a chamfered surround, and the windows are mullioned. | II |
| Shireburn Quadrangle, Ambulacrum and former Laboratories, Stonyhurst College; 53.84702°N 2.47185°W | | 1699 | The buildings around the quadrangle have later been altered and extended. They are in sandstone with slate roofs, and have two, 2 1/2, three or four storeys. The former laboratories were built in about 1810, and the Ambulacrum, by Joseph Hansom, was added in 1849–52. Some windows are mullioned, and others are sashes. | II |
| 9 The Dene; 53.83610°N 2.48281°W | — | c. 1700 | A sandstone house with a modern tile roof in two storeys. The windows are mullioned with chamfered surrounds, and the doorway has a plain surround. | II |
| Garden pavilions and walls, Stonyhurst College; 53.84489°N 2.46990°W | — | c. 1700 | A pair of square pavilions in sandstone with lead roofs. Each has quoins, a moulded cornice with modillions and egg and dart decoration, and a concave pyramidal roof surmounted by an eagle. The windows are sashes with architraves. The architrave of the doorway has a lintel carved with a grotesque face, and above it is an urn with a festoon. Between the pavilions is a low brick wall with stone coping, wooden railings, and fluted stone posts with acorn and pine cone finials. | I |
| Gate piers, Stonyhurst College; 53.84576°N 2.47045°W | — | c. 1700 | A pair of square sandstone gate piers standing to the north of the Observatory pond. They have broken segmental pediments decorated with urns and festoons. | II |
| Gate piers and wall, Stonyhurst College; 53.84616°N 2.47278°W | — | c. 1700 | The gate piers and wall are in sandstone. The wall runs to the southwest of St Peter's Church. The pair of piers was moved to the present site in 1799. They are square, and each pier has a broken segmental pediment with an urn and a festoon. | II |
| Observatory pond, Stonyhurst College; 53.84533°N 2.47048°W | | c. 1700 | The pond is surrounded by a low circular wall with sandstone coping, and it contains five statues. In the centre of the pond is a lead statue of Regulus by van Nost. On the south side of the pond is a sandstone pedestal carrying a sundial with a brass gnomon, on the east and west sides are pedestals with finials and balls. The north side has a polygonal sundial with gnomons showing the times in different parts of the world. | II |
| Steps, walls and piers, Stonyhurst College; 53.84546°N 2.47020°W | — | c. 1700 | These stand to the northeast of the Observatory pond, and are in sandstone. They were moved to their present position in 1856. They consist of a flight of eleven steps, flanked by convex walls with copings, and terminal piers with pine cone finials. | II |
| Wall and gateway door, Stonyhurst College; 53.84556°N 2.47135°W | — | c. 1700 | The wall runs to the southeast of St Peter's Church, and is in brick with sandstone coping. Near its northwest end is a sandstone door surround with bolection moulding. | II |
| Shireburn Cottages; 53.83957°N 2.48113°W | | 1706 | A group of almshouses moved to the present site in 1947. They are in sandstone with a stone-slate roof, and have two storeys. The building consists of a main block with three bays projecting at the centre, and wings at the sides forming a courtyard enclosed by a balustrade, and approached by ten semicircular steps. The central bays have a moulded doorway and are pedimented. The pediment contains a coat of arms, and on the top are three vases. The gables of the wings contain plaques, roundels, and finials. | II* |
| Statue of St Jerome, Stonyhurst College; 53.84541°N 2.47097°W | — | Early 18th century | The statue of St Jerome is by van Nost and stands to the northwest of the Observatory pond. It is in lead on a shaped square stone base that is decorated with acanthus leaves. | II |
| Statue of St Mary Magdalene, Stonyhurst College; 53.84562°N 2.47041°W | — | Early 18th century | The statue of St Mary Magdalene is by van Nost and stands to the north of the Observatory pond. It is in lead on a shaped square stone base that is decorated with acanthus leaves. | II |
| Shireburn Arms Hotel and former stable block 53.83605°N 2.47986°W | | Mid 18th century (probable) | The building is in sandstone and has two storeys. The hotel has a slate roof, it is in five bays, and contains sash windows, and a doorway that has a plain surround and a semicircular head with a keystone. The former stable block forms a projecting wing on the left, it has a stone-slate roof, modern windows, and a flight of external steps leading to a first floor doorway. | II |
| Gate piers, Stonyhurst College; 53.84467°N 2.47047°W | | 18th century (possible) | The pair of gate piers stands to the south of the observatory. They are in sandstone and are square in section. Each pier has a moulded cornice and a ball finial. | II |
| Steps, walls and piers, Stonyhurst College; 53.84521°N 2.47077°W | — | 18th century (possible) | These stand to the southwest of the Observatory pond, and are in sandstone. They consist of ten steps flanked by walls with copings. The walls end in piers, the lower ones with acorn finials. | II |
| Winkley Hall Farmhouse and Cottage; 53.84100°N 2.44356°W | — | 18th century | The house is in sandstone, partly rendered, with slate roofs, and contains re-used 17th-century material. It has two storeys with attics, and comprises an east wing and a parallel middle wing, and a west wing added in the 19th century. The west wall of the middle wing contains mullioned and transomed windows, there are sash windows in the east wing, and modern windows elsewhere. The doorways have plain surrounds. | II |
| Doeford Bridge; 53.88291°N 2.53312°W | | c.1770 | The bridge carries a road over the River Hodder. It is in sandstone, and consists of two segmental arches with a central triangular cutwater. The bridge has a solid parapet with coping. | II |
| 2, 4 and 6 Whalley Road; 53.83655°N 2.47924°W | — | Late 18th century | A row of three sandstone cottages with a stone-slate roof in two storeys. Most of the windows are sashes, No. 2 has a bow window, and No. 6 has a casement window and a wooden porch. | II |
| Cross Gills Farmhouse; 53.83711°N 2.46740°W | — | Late 18th century | The house is in brick, with stone dressings including quoins and a plinth, and a slate roof. It has two storeys and three bays. The windows are mullioned with plain surrounds, and a doorway with a stone architrave. | II |
| Higher Hodder Bridge; 53.86530°N 2.46174°W | | Late 18th century (probable) | A road bridge crossing the River Hodder, it is in sandstone, and consists of two elliptical arches. The bridge has triangular cutwaters, and a solid parapet with coping. | II |
| Hodder Place; 53.85423°N 2.45453°W | — | Late 18th century | A house, once used as a school, with extensions including a wing in 1868–69, later converted into flats. The building is in sandstone with slate roofs. Its south front has a central section with three storeys and three bays. To the left of this is a section with two storeys and two bays, and further left a further two-bay section. To the right of the central section are two bays and an octagonal corner tower. The east face has two storeys and six bays, with a similar tower at the north end. | II |
| Nook's Farmhouse; 53.85740°N 2.49717°W | — | Late 18th century | A sandstone house with a stone-slate roof in two storeys. It consists of the original two-bay house and a barn to the left that has been incorporated. In the house is a mullioned window, and the former barn has a wide entrance with a segmental head, now glazed. | II |
| Punch Bowl Inn; 53.83601°N 2.49698°W | | 1793 | A public house in sandstone with a slate roof in two storeys, and with extensions on both sides. The original part has two bays, a doorway with a plain surround, and an inscribed plaque above it. To the right is a possible barn incorporated in the building. To the left is a taller bay, and to the left of that is a much taller 19th-century addition. The windows are sashes. Demolished on 16 June 2021. | II |
| South Front, Boys' Chapel and Shirk, Stonyhurst College; 53.84693°N 2.47113°W | | 1799 | The oldest part is the Shirk, the South Front and Boy's Chapel being built in 1875–88. They are in sandstone, the Shirk has a slate roof the South Front an asphalt roof, and the Boys' chapel a copper roof. The Shirk is in Georgian style, with three storeys and seven bays, and it contains Venetian windows. The South Front is in English Renaissance style, it has three storeys, a central range of 15 bays, wings of eight and nine wings, and has octagonal turrets with copper domed cupolas. The Boys' Chapel is in Gothic Revival style. It occupies the upper two storeys and has six bays, a battlemented parapet, pointed windows with Perpendicular tracery, and pilasters containing niches with statues. The upper parts of the pilasters contain gargoyles, and seated statues rise above the parapet. | II* |
| Guild Hall; 53.83713°N 2.47984°W | | c. 1800 | Later used as a social club, the building is in sandstone with slate roofs. It has a cruciform plan, and is in two storeys, with a central taller square block with a pyramidal roof. The windows are sashes, and the doorways have plain surrounds. There is an external stone flight of steps, and a porch with decorative bargeboards. | II |
| 51 and 53 Avenue Road; 53.83993°N 2.48186°W | — | 1821 | A pair of sandstone cottages with quoins and a roof of imitation stone-slate. They are in two storeys and two bays, and the windows are sashes. The door to No. 51 has a plain surround, and the door for No. 53 is in the left gable. | II |
| Bayley Arms; 53.83858°N 2.48091°W | | Early 19th century | A sandstone public house with a slate roof, in two storeys. It has a two-bay projecting section that contains a central doorway with a plain surround. To the right is a single-bay section, and to the left is a former barn that has been incorporated. The windows are sashes. | II |
| Southwest Barn, Hall Barns Farm; 53.84417°N 2.46855°W | — | Early 19th century (possible) | The barn is in sandstone with a stone-slate roof, and has single-storey outshuts. It contains a wide doorway that has a segmental arch with a keystone. Above is it is a re-set coat of arms. | II |
| Mausoleum; 53.84154°N 2.48145°W | | Just after 1825 | The mausoleum is in the cemetery, and is in sandstone. On the front are two Ionic columns with a pediment. The inner doorway has an architrave with a cornice and an inscribed lintel. Above the door is a fanlight, and the side walls each contain one window with a plain surround. | II |
| New Bridge; 53.84814°N 2.45099°W | | 1826 | The bridge carries the B6243 road over the River Hodder. It is in sandstone, and consists of three elliptical arches with chamfered voussoirs, the middle arch being the largest. The bridge has a solid parapet with rounded coping, and at the ends are squat pillars with rounded caps. | II |
| St. Mary's Hall; 53.84796°N 2.46729°W | | 1830 | Built as a seminary, and later used as a preparatory school, it was extended in 1880. It is in sandstone with slate roofs, and has three storeys with attics. The windows are sashes. The original part has eleven bays containing a doorway with a plain surround, a semicircular head, attached Tuscan columns, a plain frieze and a moulded cornice. The extension added seven bays to both sides. At the rear is a chapel with a semicircular apse. | II |
| St Peter's Church, Stonyhurst College; 53.84597°N 2.47224°W | | 1832–35 | The church was designed by J. J. Scoles in Perpendicular style. It is in sandstone with a slate roof, and consists of a nave and sanctuary with a clerestory, aisles, side chapels, and sacristies. At the corners are octagonal stair turrets with traceried cupolas and crocketed ogee roofs. Between the bays on the sides of the church are pilaster buttresses rising to crocketed pinnacles. | I |
| St John's Vicarage; 53.83607°N 2.48459°W | — | Early to mid 19th century | The vicarage is in rendered stone with sandstone dressings, quoins, and a slate roof. There are two storeys and three bays. On the front is a timber porch and a doorway with a plain surround. The windows are sashes. | II |
| Merrick's Hall; 53.83417°N 2.48594°W | — | 1838 | A sandstone house with a stone-slate roof containing 17th-century material. It has two storeys with attics and a two-bay front. The central doorway has a plain surround and a lintel inscribed with the date. In the south front are sash windows, and the north front contains mullioned windows. | II |
| St John's Church; 53.83584°N 2.48498°W | | 1838 | The church is in sandstone with a slate roof, and consists of a nave and chancel under a continuous roof, a south porch, and a west tower with a battlemented parapet. The windows are lancets. In the church is a stained glass window by Morris & Co. depicting Raphael. | II |
| Old Observatory; 53.84514°N 2.47021°W | | 1838 | An underground magnetic chamber was added to the observatory in 1866. The building is in sandstone and has an octagonal plan, with four projecting pedimented wings. On the top is a circular timber and glass lantern with a felted roof. The windows have architraves and false keystones, some of which are cut through for telescopes. The doorway is approached by five steps and has an architrave and a cornice on brackets. (Note: This observatory was replaced in 1866 by another one on a different site. This is not listed.) | II |
| Mill; 53.84549°N 2.47299°W | — | 1840 | Originally built as a corn mill, later extended, and then used as a store, the building stands to the southwest of the South Front of Stonyhurst College. It is in sandstone with slate roofs, and has three storeys. The original block has three parallel pitched roofs, and the extension has two, forming five gables facing northwest. It contains doorways, windows, and loading bays. | II |
| Old Infirmary, Stonyhurst College; 53.84682°N 2.47341°W | | 1842–43 | Designed by J. J. Scoles, the building is in Jacobean Revival style. It is in sandstone with Welsh slate roofs, and has two storeys, a basement and attics. The symmetrical south front has five bays containing windows, some of which are sashes, and others are mullioned. There is a plain parapet with pinnacle finials. At the rear is a dog-leg passage connecting it with the West Front. | II |
| Playing field wall, Stonyhurst College; 53.84675°N 2.46932°W | — | 19th century | The wall runs along the northeast and southeast sides of the playing field. It is a low wall in sandstone carrying cast iron barleysugar railings with shaped fluted piers. The wall contains a pair of square sandstone gate piers, each with a dentilled cornice, and one retaining its ball finial. | II |
| Chaigley Manor; 53.86903°N 2.46530°W | — | 1857 | A sandstone house with a slate roof in two storeys and four bays. The central area of the roof is surrounded by iron railings. The windows in the ground floor are cross windows, and in the upper floor they are mullioned. The west front is battlemented, it has corner turrets, and contains a doorway with a chamfered surround and a four-centred head. | II |
| Boer War Memorial; 53.83662°N 2.48003°W | | Early 20th century | The memorial commemorates the 1st Earl Roberts and others who served in the Second Boer War. It is in sandstone and has a base of four square steps with an inscribed brass plate. Standing on the base is a Celtic cross decorated with interlace designs and vine scroll ornament. | II |
| Former font, Stonyhurst College; 53.84561°N 2.46981°W | — | Uncertain | The former font has been used later as a garden ornament. It has a circular stem on a square base and carries an oval bowl. The base is carved with the Instruments of the Passion, and the bowl is decorated with scenes from the life of Christ. | II |
| Hurst Green Cross; 53.83646°N 2.48021°W | — | Uncertain | The cross was possibly restored in the 19th century. It is in sandstone and has a base of three square steps. On the cross head is a roughly punched trefoil shape. | II |

== Notes and references ==
=== Sources ===
- Hartwell, Clare; Pevsner, Nikolaus (2009) [1969], Lancashire: North, The Buildings of England, New Haven and London: Yale University Press, ISBN 978-0-300-12667-9
- Historic England, "Cross of St. Paulinus, Aighton, Bailey and Chaigley (1146900)", National Heritage List for England
- Historic England, "Remains of Chapel of St. John the Baptist at Bailey Hall, Aighton, Bailey and Chaigley (1362221)", National Heritage List for England
- Historic England, "Barn approximately 500 metres west of Bailey Hall, Aighton, Bailey and Chaigley (1147023)", National Heritage List for England
- Historic England, "Barn on north-west side of farmyard, Aighton, Bailey and Chaigley (1072302)", National Heritage List for England
- Historic England, "Old Bridge, Aighton, Bailey and Chaigley (1362197)", National Heritage List for England
- Historic England, "The Old Lower Hodder Bridge, Aighton, Bailey and Chaigley (1003563)", National Heritage List for England
- Historic England, "Stonyhurst College, Old Quadrangle, Aighton, Bailey and Chaigley (1419714)", National Heritage List for England
- Historic England, "Greengore, Aighton, Bailey and Chaigley (1308723)", National Heritage List for England
- Historic England, "Bailey Hall, Aighton, Bailey and Chaigley (1072306)", National Heritage List for England
- Historic England, "The Flat, Aighton, Bailey and Chaigley (1072333)", National Heritage List for England
- Historic England, "Woodfields Farmhouse and No. 8 Woodfields, Aighton, Bailey and Chaigley (1308721)", National Heritage List for England
- Historic England, "Bailey House, Aighton, Bailey and Chaigley (1072335)", National Heritage List for England
- Historic England, "Jumbles, Aighton, Bailey and Chaigley (1362222)", National Heritage List for England
- Historic England, "Trough House, Aighton, Bailey and Chaigley (1072309)", National Heritage List for England
- Historic England, "Stonyhurst College, Shireburn Quadrangle, Ambulacrum and former Laboratories, Aighton, Bailey and Chaigley (1419721)", National Heritage List for England
- Historic England, "No. 9 The Dene, Aighton, Bailey and Chaigley (1308781)", National Heritage List for England
- Historic England, "The Garden Pavilions and connecting wall, Aighton, Bailey and Chaigley (1146979)", National Heritage List for England
- Historic England, "Gate piers opposite south front, 40 metres north of Observatory pond, Aighton, Bailey and Chaigley (1072339)", National Heritage List for England
- Historic England, "Gate Piers and Wall from southwest corner of Infirmary running southeast, returning northeast in front of Church of St. Peter and containing two gatepiers, Aighton, Bailey and Chaigley (1308732)", National Heritage List for England
- Historic England, "Garden steps, walls and piers, 12 metres northeast of Observatory pond, Aighton, Bailey and Chaigley (1362216)", National Heritage List for England
- Historic England, "Retaining wall and statues and Observatory Pond, Aighton, Bailey and Chaigley (1072340)", National Heritage List for England
- Historic England, "Wall and gateway door, beginning 20 metres southeast of Church of St Peter and running 130 metres southeast of Church of St Peter, Aighton, Bailey and Chaigley (1072337)", National Heritage List for England
- Historic England, "Shireburn Cottages, Aighton, Bailey and Chaigley (1308779)", National Heritage List for England
- Historic England, "Statue of St. Jerome, 250 metres north-west of Observatory pond, Aighton, Bailey and Chaigley (1308710)", National Heritage List for England
- Historic England, "Statue of St. Mary Magdalene, 250 metres north of Observatory pond, Aighton, Bailey and Chaigley (1072341)", National Heritage List for England
- Historic England, "Shireburn Arms Hotel and former stable block adjoining at right angles to the east, Aighton, Bailey and Chaigley (1362195)", National Heritage List for England
- Historic England, "Gate piers, 50 metres south of Observatory, Aighton, Bailey and Chaigley (1072301)", National Heritage List for England
- Historic England, "Garden steps, walls and piers 12 metres southwest of Observatory pond, Aighton, Bailey and Chaigley (1072300)", National Heritage List for England
- Historic England, "Winkley Hall Farmhouse and Winkley Cottage, Aighton, Bailey and Chaigley (1147066)", National Heritage List for England
- Historic England, "Doeford Bridge, Bowland Forest Low (1072307)", National Heritage List for England
- Historic England, "Nos. 2, 4 and 6 Whalley Road, Aighton, Bailey and Chaigley (1072305)", National Heritage List for England
- Historic England, "Cross Gills Farmhouse, Aighton, Bailey and Chaigley (1362220)", National Heritage List for England
- Historic England, "Higher Hodder Bridge, Aighton, Bailey and Chaigley (1072308)", National Heritage List for England
- Historic England, "Hodder Place, Aighton, Bailey and Chaigley (1147035)", National Heritage List for England
- Historic England, "Nook's Farmhouse, Aighton, Bailey and Chaigley (1308694)", National Heritage List for England
- Historic England, "Punch Bowl Inn, Aighton, Bailey and Chaigley (1146901)", National Heritage List for England
- Historic England, "Stonyhurst College, South Front, Boys' Chapel and Shirk, Aighton, Bailey and Chaigley (1419717)", National Heritage List for England
- Historic England, "Guild Hall, Aighton, Bailey and Chaigley (1072331)", National Heritage List for England
- Historic England, "Nos. 51 and 53 Avenue Road, Aighton, Bailey and Chaigley (1072332)", National Heritage List for England
- Historic England, "Bayley Arms, Aighton, Bailey and Chaigley (1362234)", National Heritage List for England
- Historic England, "Barn at south-west side of farmyard, Aighton, Bailey and Chaigley (1362218)", National Heritage List for England
- Historic England, "The Mausoleum, Aighton, Bailey and Chaigley (1072303)", National Heritage List for England
- Historic England, "New Bridge, Aighton, Bailey and Chaigley (1146904)", National Heritage List for England
- Historic England, "St. Mary's Hall, Aighton, Bailey and Chaigley (1362219)", National Heritage List for England
- Historic England, "Stonyhurst College, Church of St Peter (RC), Aighton, Bailey and Chaigley (1419718)", National Heritage List for England
- Historic England, "The Vicarage at the Church of St. John Evangelist, Aighton, Bailey and Chaigley (1146906)", National Heritage List for England
- Historic England, "Merrick's Hall, Aighton, Bailey and Chaigley (1072334)", National Heritage List for England
- Historic England, "Church of St. John Evangelist, Aighton, Bailey and Chaigley (1362196)", National Heritage List for England
- Historic England, "The Observatory, 100 metres southeast of pond, Aighton, Bailey and Chaigley (1308739)", National Heritage List for England
- Historic England, "The Mill, Aighton, Bailey and Chaigley (1072304)", National Heritage List for England
- Historic England, "Stonyhurst College, Old Infirmary and attached passage, Aighton, Bailey and Chaigley (1419719)", National Heritage List for England
- Historic England, "Wall on northeast side of playing field, returning 70 metres on southeast side and including a pair of gate piers, Aighton, Bailey and Chaigley (1072338)", National Heritage List for England
- Historic England, "Chaigley Manor, Aighton, Bailey and Chaigley (1146892)", National Heritage List for England
- Historic England, "Boer War Memorial on west side of the green, Aighton, Bailey and Chaigley (1146878)", National Heritage List for England
- Historic England, "Former Font, 450 metres northeast of Observatory pond, Aighton, Bailey and Chaigley (1362217)", National Heritage List for England
- Historic England, "Hurst Green Cross on west side of village green, Aighton, Bailey and Chaigley (1072330)", National Heritage List for England
- Historic England, Listed Buildings
