= Scott Park =

Park in Burnley, United Kingdom

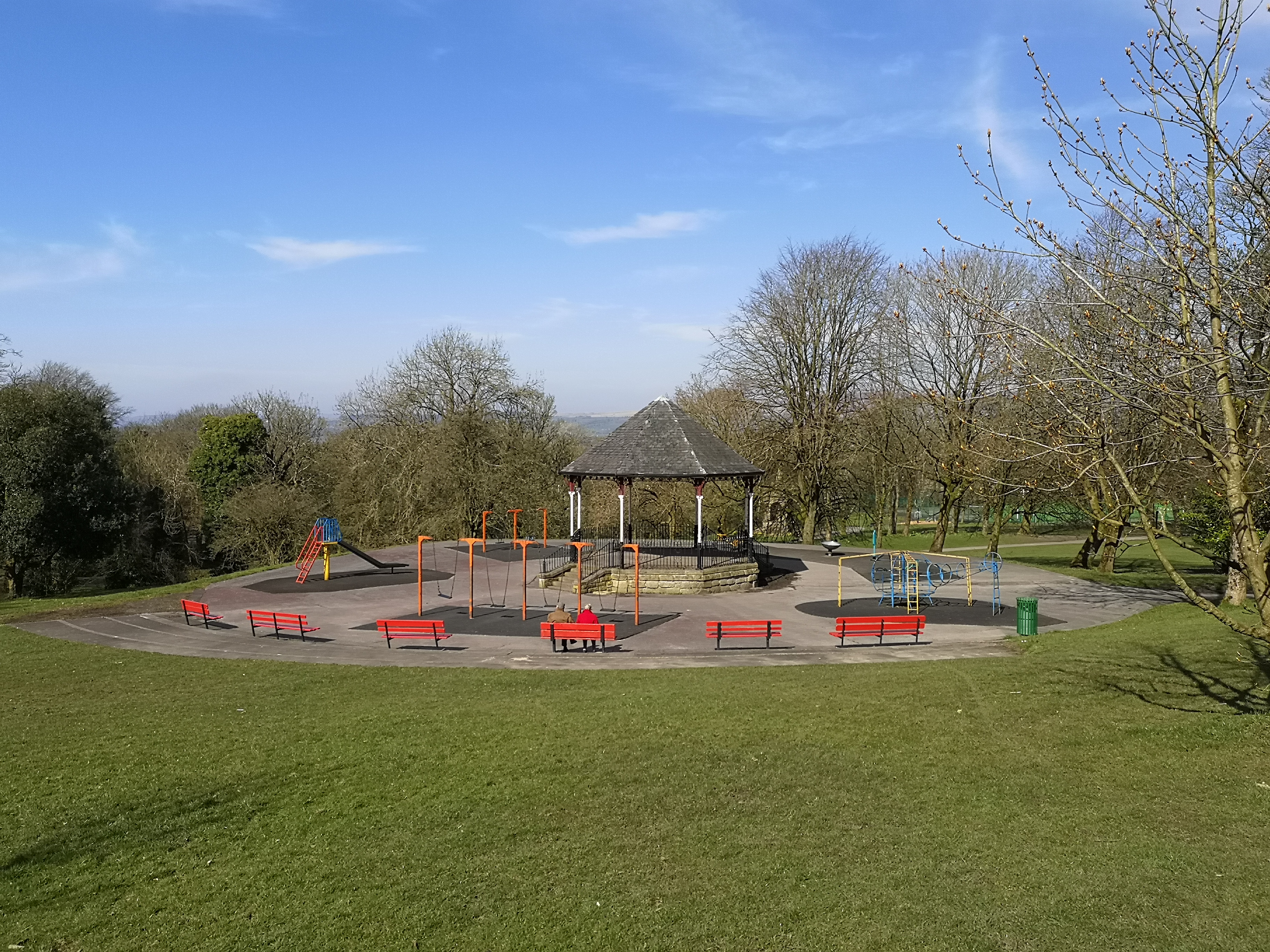
- The bandstand at Scott Park
- Interactive map of Scott Park
- Type: Public
- Location: Burnley, Lancashire
- Coordinates: 53°46′52″N 2°15′24″W
- Area: 7.9 hectares (20 acres)
- Created: 1895
- Operator: Burnley Borough Council
- Status: Grade II English Heritage
- Awards: Green Flag

Scott Park is a public park in Burnley, Lancashire. It covers 7.9 hectares (20 acres) and was opened in 1895. Located south of the town centre, attractions include tennis courts, a children's play area, a bandstand, and bowling greens.

In the second half of the nineteenth century Burnley's population increased almost five-fold and there was a pressing need for public open space so the council opted to provide recreation grounds with the first of these, Healey Heights located to the west of the park, acquired in 1872. The works provided employment for paupers and several more opened around the town in the following years which proved to be popular.

The land that the park occupies was part of the estate of Hood House, which was documented as early as 1563 and was latterly owned by the Halsted family of Rowley Hall. When in 1881, John Hargreaves Scott, a prominent local businessman, an alderman, and Mayor of Burnley in 1871–3, died without an heir, his will specified that upon his wife's death the remaining money be used to create a public park for the town. Mrs Scott died in 1884 and the trustees took some time to decide where to use the £10,000 available (equivalent to at least £1 million as of 2018). In 1892 the decision was finally taken to purchase approximately 7.3 hectares (18 acres) of the Hood House land, with the rest sold for building purposes. By this time Queens Park was under construction and became the town's first public park when it opened the following year.

The sloping site is located in the Rose Hill area of Burnley, between Manchester Road to the east and Coal Clough Lane to the west. Scott Park Road which connects the two and bounds the park on the south, was created as part of the development. The principle entry on Scott Park Road at the junction with Albion Street consists of a carriage entrance flanked by pedestrian entrances set between stone gate piers. The other original entrances in the north-west off Fern Road and from the east off Carr Road are similar in style but with a carriage entrance only. A stream enters the site from a valley to the south (Sep Clough) and divides the park.

Several curving paths were created, running beside, crossing over, and overlooking the watercourse, with a bandstand, several footbridges and shelters built around the site. A two-storey stone lodge (since demolished) was also constructed next to the main entrance. The park was officially opened on 8 August 1895, and a bowling green was added two years later.

A memorial was constructed to Scott and unveiled in 1898. It consists of an elaborate square canopy, mainly in sandstone, with three polished granite colonnettes at each corner. On the top is a central octagonal pillar carrying a flaming urn. Inside the canopy is a pedestal with a marble bust of the donor, which was added the following year. Tennis courts with a pavilion and an additional bowling green were added the early 1900s. Late in the 20th century, the former approximately 0.6-hectare (1.5-acre) site of Lower Hood House, lying between the park and Manchester Road was incorporated in to it.

Scott Park is listed as a Grade II public park by English Heritage and has also been awarded the Green Flag Award for its high standards.

Incidentally a house on Scott Park Road was in 1939, the first home of the actor Sir Ian McKellen. This was only for a brief time however as his family moved away from the town within months of his birth.

== See also ==
- Listed buildings in Burnley
