= Aighton, Bailey and Chaigley =

Civil parish in Lancashire, England

Coordinates: 53.84°N 2.49°W

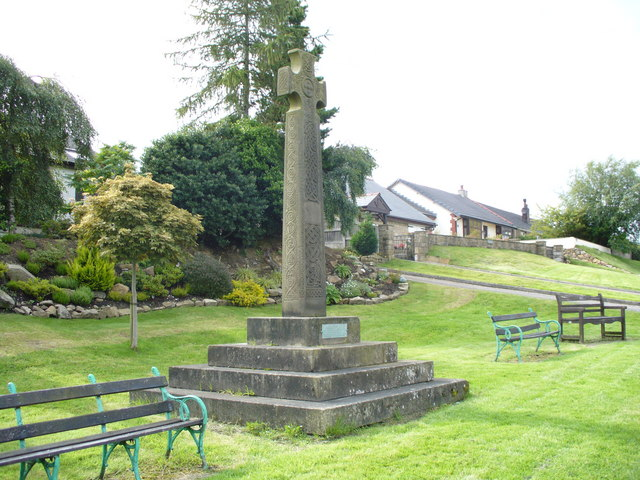
- Boer War Memorial at Hurst Green

- Location in Ribble Valley Location in the Forest of Bowland Location within Lancashire
- Area: 25.4318 km^{2} (9.8193 sq mi)
- Population: 1,307 (2011)
  - Density: 51/km^{2} (130/sq mi)
- OS grid reference: SD6837
- District: Ribble Valley
- Shire county: Lancashire
- Region: North West
- Country: England
- Sovereign state: United Kingdom
- Post town: CLITHEROE
- Postcode district: BB7
- Dialling code: 01254
- Police: Lancashire
- Fire: Lancashire
- Ambulance: North West
- UK Parliament: Ribble Valley

Aighton, Bailey and Chaigley is a civil parish in the Borough of Ribble Valley in Lancashire, England, just west of Clitheroe. The population of the civil parish at the 2011 census was 1,307, an increase from 1,249 in 2001.

The main settlements in the parish are Hurst Green and Walker Fold. Other places are Aighton, Bailey and Chaigley, originally three hamlets forming a township. Stonyhurst College is located near to Hurst Green, within the parish.

== History ==
Aighton was mentioned in 1870 in the Imperial Gazetteer of England and Wales by John Marius Wilson, who wrote:

AIGHTON, one of three hamlets forming a township in the parish of Mitton, Lancashire. It lies near Hodder river, under Longridge fell, 3½ miles NNW of Whalley r. station, and 5 WSW of Clitheroe. It contains cotton factories, a workhouse, and the Roman Catholic college of Stonyhurst. The other hamlets of the township are Bailey and Chaighley. Acres in the three, 5,780. Real property, £6,726. Pop., 1,500. Houses, 244.

The operator of Chaigley Farms was unsuccessful in a 1996 high court case related to the legal concept of a retention of title clause. The farms had sold livestock to an abattoir under a contract incorporating such a clause, intended to protect the seller's financial interests until they have been paid by the buyer. The goods were sold as "livestock"; the judge, Garland J., held that upon slaughter the carcasses were no longer "livestock" and that subsequent treatment, removing the parts which were not to be sold on as butchers' meat, extinguished the farms' title to the property.

== Governance ==
Aighton, Bailey and Chaigley was once a part of the ancient parish of Mitton. This became a civil parish in 1866, forming part of the Clitheroe Rural District from 1894 till 1974.

Aighton, Bailey and Chaigley also gives its name to a ward of Ribble Valley Borough Council. The ward elects a single councillor, who currently is Janet Alcock of the Conservative Party.

== See also ==
- Listed buildings in Aighton, Bailey and Chaigley
