= Miller Park, Preston =

Public park in Lancashire, England

Miller Park
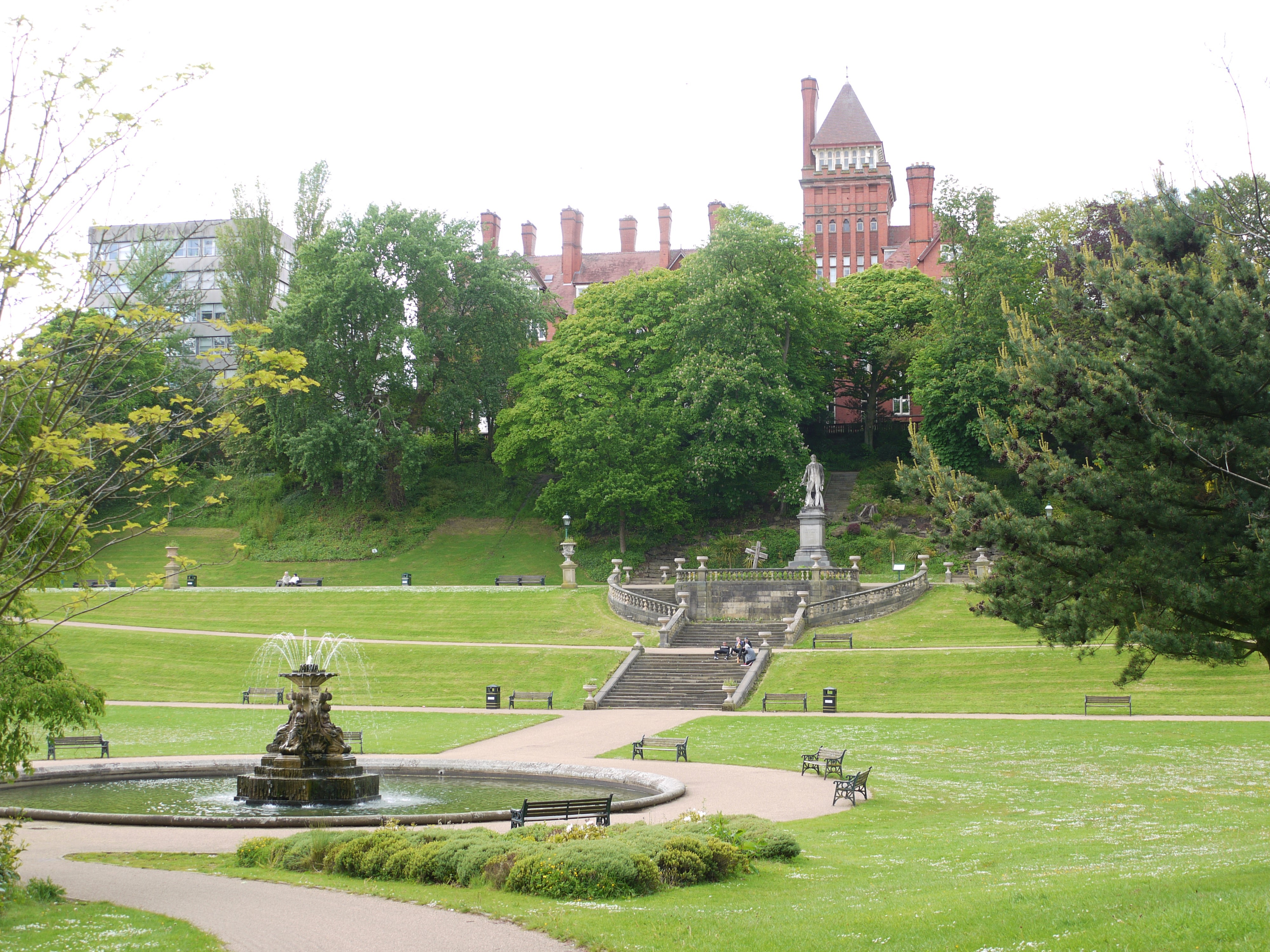

- Location within Preston city centre
- Location: Preston, Lancashire, England
- Coordinates: 53°45′07″N 2°42′14″W
- Created: 1860s
- Operator: Preston City Council
- Website: www.preston.gov.uk/yourservices/culture-parks-and-events/avenham-and-miller-parks/

Miller Park is a public park under the management of Preston City Council. It is located on the banks of the River Ribble in Preston, Lancashire, in the north west of England. The park is one of two city centre Victorian era parks, the other being the adjacent and larger Avenham Park.

== History ==
The park was designed and built in the 1860s and has matured over the last 160 years into one of the most attractive parks in the region. As an English Heritage Grade II* listed park, it features a number of historical structures including a sundial, a grotto and a fountain. There is also an impressive statue of the 14th Earl of Derby who was British prime minister from 1866 to 1868. The two parks are separated by the East Lancashire Railway embankment and access is through the Ivy Bridge and along Riverside Walk. The East Lancashire Railway line closed in the 1970s although the viaduct across the river, which is a Grade II listed building, remains, as it carries a public footpath across the river. The west edge of the park is bounded by the embankment carrying Preston's main rail link, the West Coast Main Line.

The park was designed by Edward Milner as a 'Harmonious Whole' including the adjacent Avenham Park. This park is more formal than its neighbour and includes beautiful bedding displays, a Rose Garden and the regal Derby Walk, all of which are maintained by Preston City Council's Horticultural Services. It is overlooked by the Park Hotel, a Victorian former hotel used as offices by Lancashire County Council until 2016. A modern extension to the council offices, which also overlooked the park, was demolished in 2020 as part of works to convert the building back into a hotel.

Apart from this office block, the appearance of the park has hardly changed since it was first laid out; the only other modern construction, a brick toilet block, was demolished in March 2006. A map published in 1889 still provides an accurate representation of the park's layout.

== The inauguration of the park ==
Preston's Avenham Park, Moor Park and Miller Park were inaugurated on the same day that the former Town Hall was opened in 1867. On 28 September 1867 the Preston Chronicle commented that the preparations were in place and that the expectation was that "…….we shall have a gayer, a busier, and a more bustling town than we have had on any previous occasion, excepting, perhaps, at some of our Guilds". The following week's edition for 5 October 1887 devoted several columns to "The Opening of the New Town Hall and Inauguration of the Parks". It was a civic event of considerable size and importance and when the opening ceremony for the town hall was concluded a procession was formed which made its way to Avenham and Miler Parks. Schoolchildren from across Preston had gathered in the parks and it was estimated that 23,000 to 25,000 were present. The Duke of Cambridge, cousin to Queen Victoria, was in attendance and the band of the Third Royal Lancashire Militia entertained the crowds.

== Proposed developments ==
As part of a multimillion-pound Heritage Lottery Funded restoration project, both Avenham and Miller Park will see a facelift over the coming years. The refurbishment will include restoration of all of the historical features (including the fountain, Derby Walk, etc.), improved lighting and footpaths, vehicle controls and the new Pavilion in Avenham Park, which has a cafe and new public toilets and incorporates a police post as well as being a base for dedicated parks staff. The old stage, which was removed in early 2006, has been replaced by a small performance area and the facilities to install temporary concert stages like those used at music festivals throughout the country. These improvements help the park become cleaner and safer and provide more events and activities for the people of Preston.

== See also ==
- Avenham Park
