= Avenham Park =

Grade II* listed public park in Avenham, England

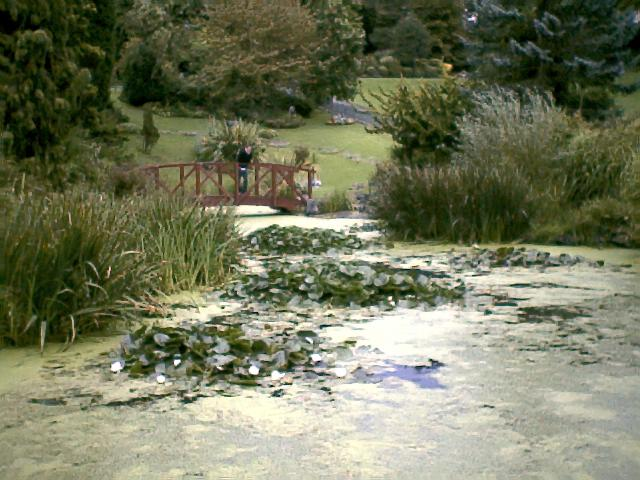
- The Japanese garden

- Location within Preston city centre
- Location: Preston, Lancashire, England
- Coordinates: 53°45′11″N 2°42′04″W
- Created: 1867
- Operator: Preston City Council

Avenham Park is a Grade II* listed public park in Avenham, close to the centre of Preston in Lancashire in the northwest of England, and managed by Preston City Council.

The park is located in Preston's Conservation area and leads down to the banks of the River Ribble. It was designed and built in the 1860s.

== Overview ==
As an Historic England Grade II* listed public park, which features a number of historical structures such as The Belvedere, the Swiss Chalet, the Boer War Memorial and Riverside Walk. The park is one of two city centre Victorian parks in Preston, the other being its neighbour - Miller Park. The two parks are separated by the East Lancashire Railway embankment and access is through the Ivy Bridge and along Riverside Walk. The East Lancashire Railway line closed in the 1970s although the viaduct across the river, which is a Grade II listed building, remains.

The park was designed by Edward Milner as a "harmonious whole" including the adjacent Miller Park. The park includes long open lawn areas and hosts a number of annual events throughout the year. Most notable among its many features is the Japanese garden or Rock Garden, which was added in the 1930s when this type of design became fashionable.

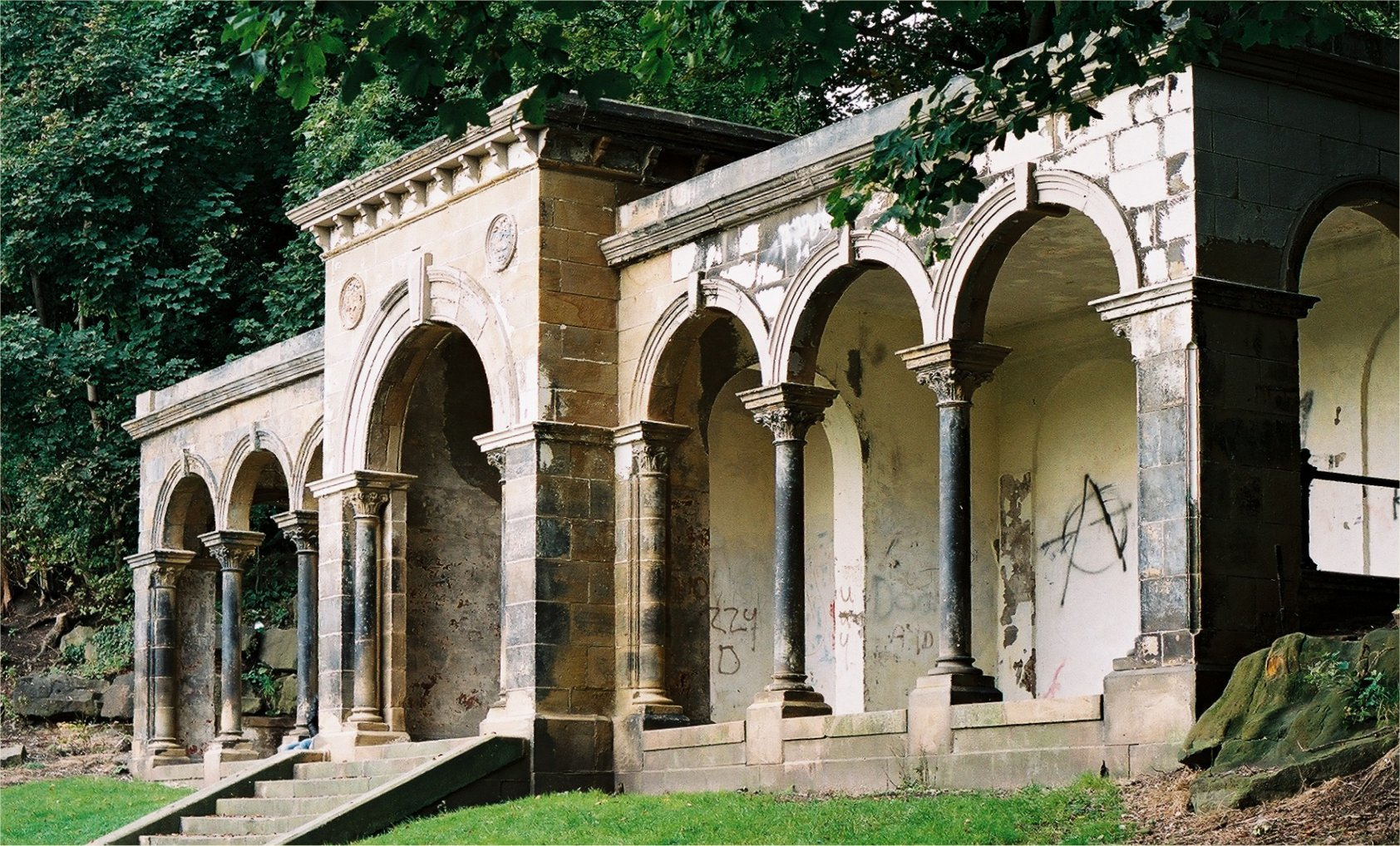
The Belvedere (in 2007, before renovation)

Another major feature of the park is The Belvedere, a pavilion on high ground at the northeastern corner of the park, overlooking the main park and river. It was originally located in Miller Park but was moved to make way for the statue of the Earl of Derby. The Belvedere is known locally as the "White House" or the "Light House".

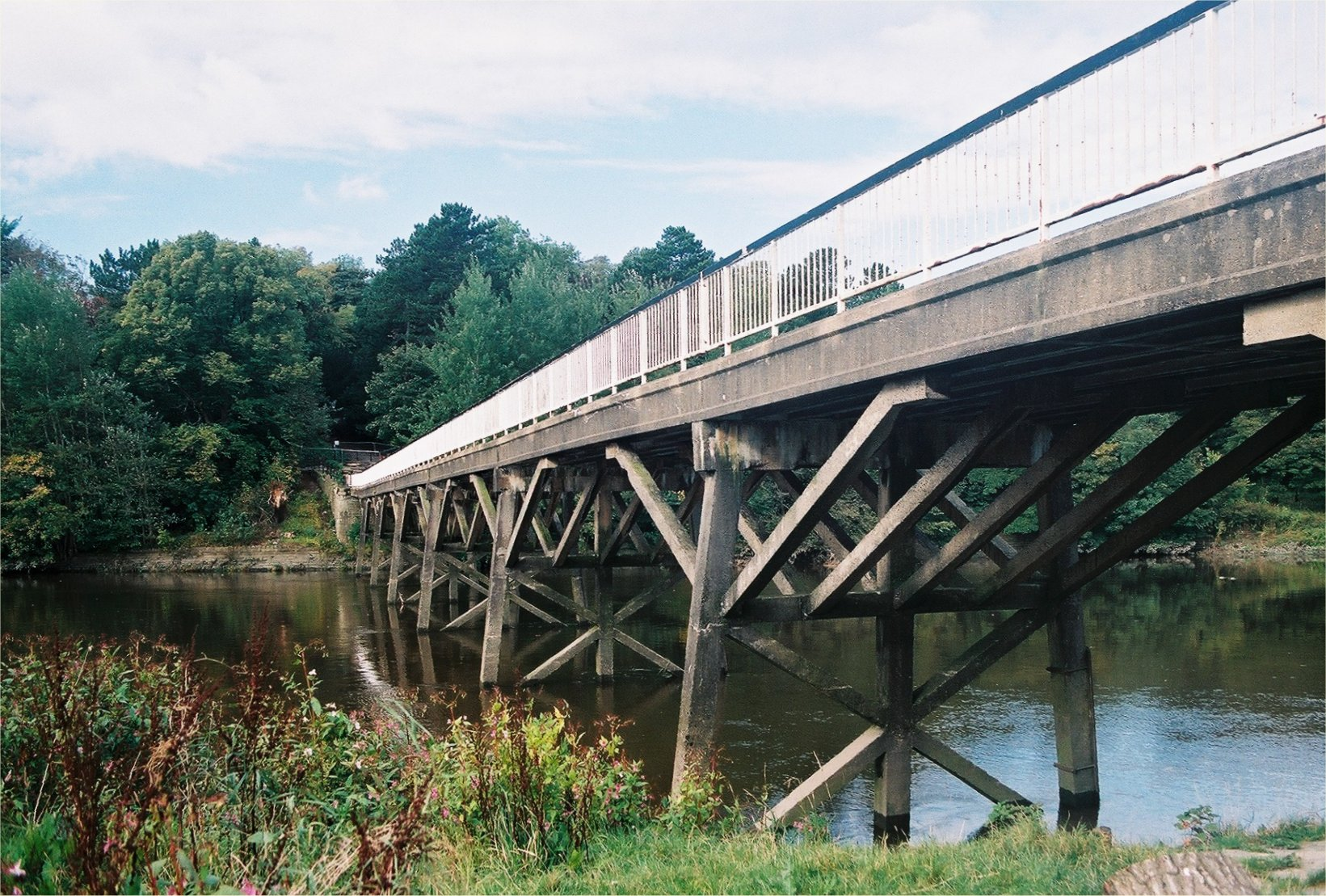
The 1960s replica tramway bridge across the Ribble

A path on the northern edge of the park follows the route of the Old Tram Road, which used to link the northern and southern parts of the Lancaster Canal. The path descends an incline to the River Ribble. On the site of the current Belvedere was once a stationary steam engine that hauled waggons up the hill. The path crosses the river on a concrete footbridge built in the 1960s on the site of the original tramway trestle bridge. The modern bridge has been built in the same style as the original wooden structure.

The field in the centre of the park has a gentle slope towards the river, and acts as a natural amphitheatre. The original Victorian Bandstand was demolished and replaced with a brick and concrete stage during the 1950s to enable the area to be used for concerts. This construction had surprisingly good acoustic qualities but fell into disuse and was demolished in March 2006, although the Park is still used for many local and regional annual events. These include Preston's Mela, which celebrates the culture of the city's large Asian community and on Easter Monday children have traditionally rolled decorated eggs down its grassy slopes since Victorian times. Bands and musicians such as Oasis, The Spice Girls, Natasha Bedingfield, Sushi, Mark Owen, and Labyrinth have also performed in Avenham Park in more recent years.

In general, the layout of the park is little changed from when the park was first laid out. An 1889 map Wayback Machine still provides an accurate representation of the park today.

== The inauguration of the park ==
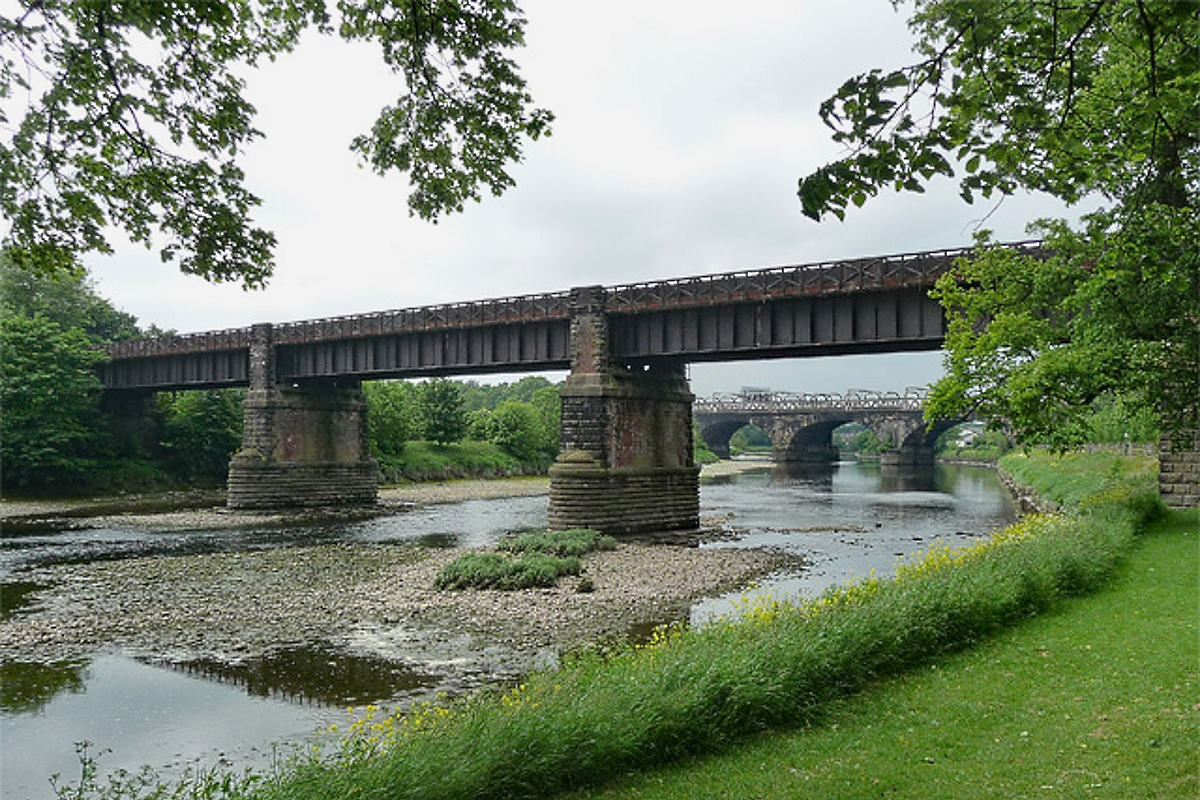
Former railway bridge which separates Avenham Park from Miller Park

Preston's Avenham Park, Moor Park and Miller Park were inaugurated on the same day that the former Preston Town Hall was opened, in 1867. On 28 September 1867 The Preston Chronicle commented that the preparations were in place and that the expectation was that "... we shall have a gayer, a busier, and a more bustling town than we have had on any previous occasion, excepting, perhaps, at some of our Guilds". The following week's edition, for 5 October 1867, devoted several columns to "The Opening of the New Town Hall and Inauguration of the Parks". It was a civic event of considerable size and importance and when the opening ceremony for the Town Hall was concluded, a procession was formed which made its way to Avenham and Miller Parks. Schoolchildren from across Preston had gathered in the parks and it was estimated that between 23,000 and 25,000 were present. The Duke of Cambridge, cousin of Queen Victoria, was in attendance and the band of the Third Royal Lancashire Militia entertained the crowds.

== Recent developments ==
As part of a multi-million pound Heritage Lottery-funded restoration project, both Avenham and Miller Parks have undergone a facelift over the last few years. The refurbishment, which is nearing completion, included restoration of all of the historical features (including The Belvedere, The Boer War Memorial etc.), improved lighting and footpaths, vehicle controls and a new Pavilion incorporating a café, public toilets and a police post and acting as a base for dedicated park staff. The old stage, which was removed in early 2006, was replaced by a small performance area and facilities to install temporary concert stages like those used at music festivals throughout the country.

An architectural design competition was launched by RIBA Competitions and McChesney Architects were chosen by Preston City Council, at a cost of £2 million. In September 2008 the new Pavilion, together with its cafe, was opened. New lamps were installed and the Japanese Garden was restored. As part of the refurbishment, the path along the railway embankment and the viaduct was widened and given a hard surface. The Council intends to open this path onto the Fishergate Centre car park, to allow direct pedestrian and cycle access from the railway.

In April 2015 an unexploded military mortar bomb was discovered by metal detectorists near the park. An area close to the Old Tram Bridge was cordoned off. In February 2019, the tram bridge was closed when an inspection revealed cracks putting the bridge at risk of collapse. In March 2024 a new suspension-type design was revealed for a replacement bridge and in April work began on a £6.6m project to replace the old tram bridge. The replacement tram bridge opened to the public on 22 May 2026.

== See also ==
- Miller Park
