= Stamford Park, Tameside =

Park in Tameside, Greater Manchester, England

Stamford Park
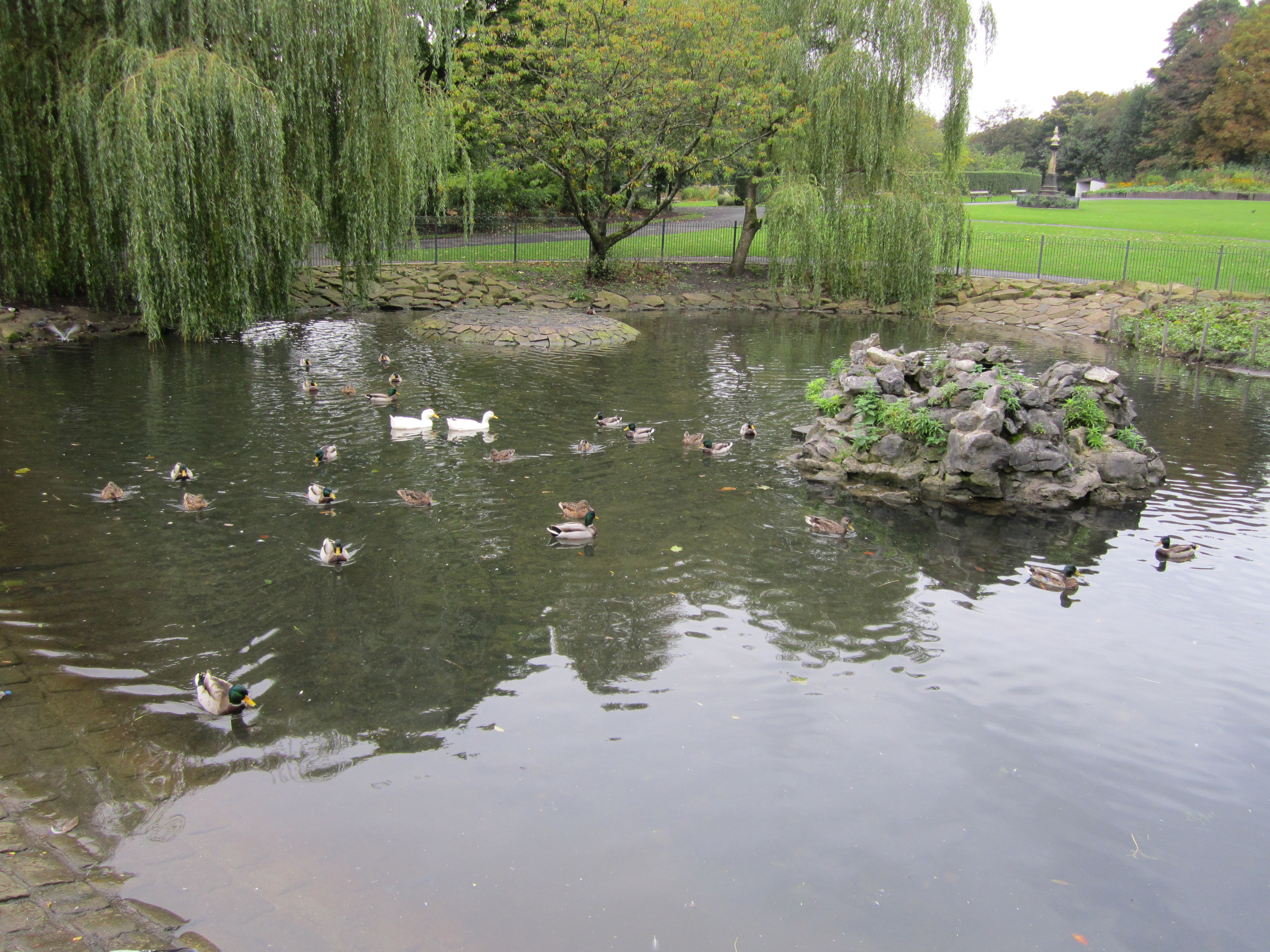
- Interactive map of Stamford Park
- Type: Park
- Location: Stalybridge, Greater Manchester
- Coordinates: 53°29′24″N 2°04′06″W
- Area: 26 hectares (64 acres)
- Open: All year

Stamford Park is a park in Stalybridge, Tameside, Greater Manchester. The park was Grade II listed with Historic England in 1986.

== History ==
The site on which the park lays was owned by the Earl of Stamford in 1668 and was part of a deer park. During the Industrial Revolution the population of the area was in poor health and began to demand a park to enjoy on their day off. In 1856 a letter was sent to the Ashton Reporter requesting the cotton mill workers raise money for a park. Fundraising began and in 1872 Highfield House and grounds was purchased, the Earl donated adjacent land and Stamford Park was opened officially on 12 July 1873. The Lord and Lady Stamford arrived for the opening and the towns of Ashton, Stalybridge and Dukinfield were decorated out in bunting and flags. A crowd of up to 80,000 watched the opening ceremony. The park continued to expand for the next two decades with the purchase of further land, a reservoir was purchased which was turned into the boating lake in the South and a fishing lake in the North. The Coronation Gates were installed in the 1950s to celebrate the Coronation of Queen Elizabeth II.

=== Landmarks ===
The park contains two Grade II listed features; the first is Stocks which are inscribed "John Wood Constable 1730", made of stone they were formerly located outside Ashton-under-Lyne workhouse and were given by Isaac Watts Boulton J.P. The second is a stone cross inscribed with "Erected by Thos. Walker, John Knight, Robert Lees, Constables 1793".

== Facilities ==
The park contains floral and shrub beds, a grassed area used for games, picnics and other informal activities, "The Dingle" woodland area, a children's play area, a water fountain, bowling greens, a multi-use games area for football, basketball, cricket and other sports. A Parkrun takes place in the grounds every Saturday morning. There was a conservatory that was demolished in 2025 and an aviary. During the summer months the boating lake is in use and there is a land train.
