= Vernon Park =

Country park in Stockport, Greater Manchester, England

Coordinates: 53°24′47″N 2°8′24″W

Vernon Park is the oldest country park in Stockport, Greater Manchester, England. The Victorian park contains the Vernon Park Museum.

== History ==
Vernon Park opened on 20 September 1858 as Pinch Belly Park or the People's Park. It was built by Stockport Corporation on land donated by George John Warren (Lord Vernon). Work was given to the many unemployed mill workers of the time and it became known as Pinch Belly Park due to their hunger.

The park has Grade II status in the English Heritage Register of Historic Parks and Gardens. After being awarded £2.1 million from the Heritage Lottery Fund for restoration, the park reopened on 29 September 2000.

== Park ==
In 1842 Lord Vernon presented to Stockport Corporation 15 acres (6.1 ha) of land about one mile (1.6 km) southeast of the town. The council laid it out as a public park. One portion rises from the bank of the River Goyt which flows over a weir making a waterfall. There are statues, ponds, rock work, a fountain and planting. The park was formally opened by the Mayor of Stockport, William Williamson, on 20 September 1858.

The park has a bandstand, a maze, a pond, a playground and a bowling green. The gardens include water features, a fernery, a sunken garden and herbaceous borders. The landscape includes tree-lined paths, statues and a cannon. The open views allow sight of the nearby mills.

== Vernon Park Museum ==
A museum was opened in 1860. Originally known as the Stockport Museum, the building was renamed the Vernon Museum. In 2013 the museum was closed and many of its 2,800 objects were moved to the Stockport Museum. The building is now run by Pure Innovations and includes a café run by people with disabilities.

== Gallery ==
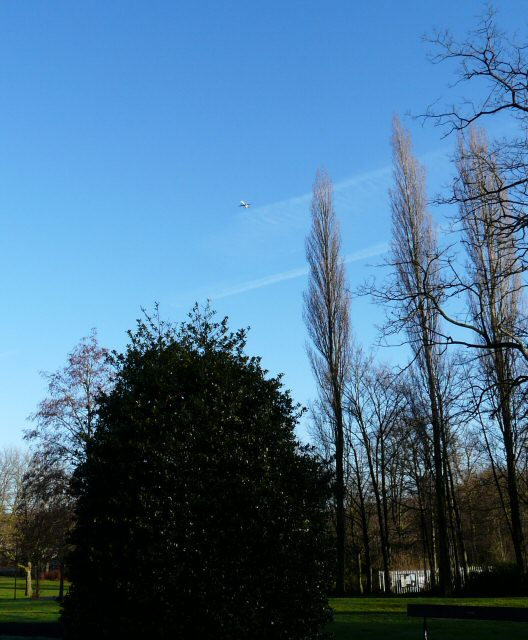

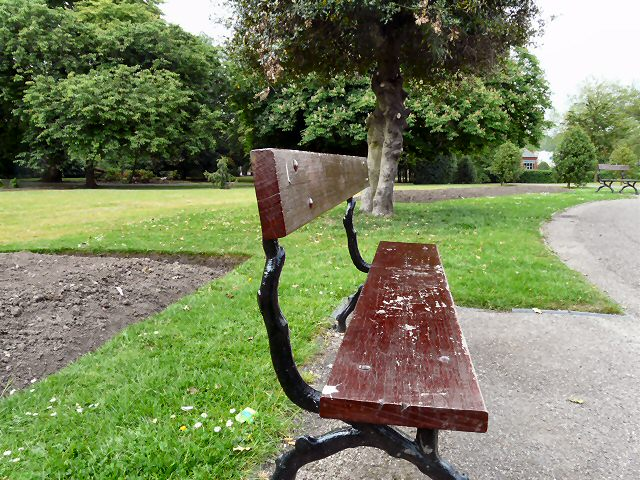
Vernon Park Bench and holly tree

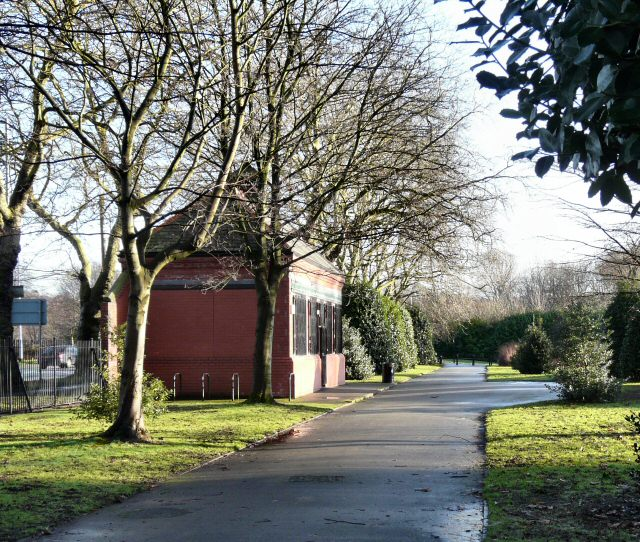
The New Bridge Lane entrance to Vernon Park

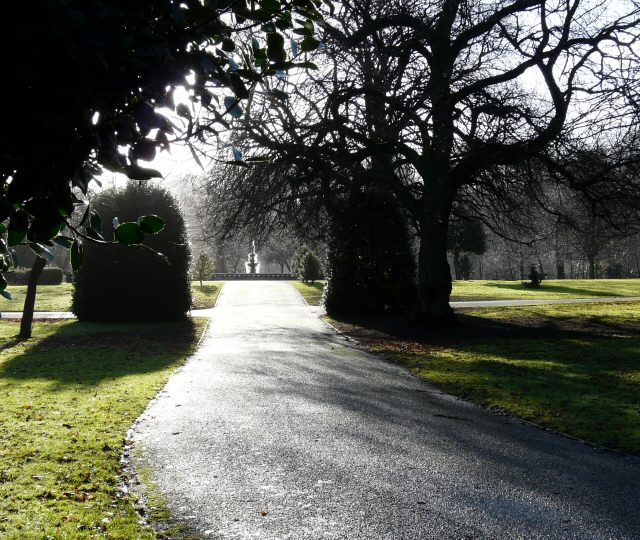
Looking back at the fountain in Vernon Park from near the New Bridge Lane entrance

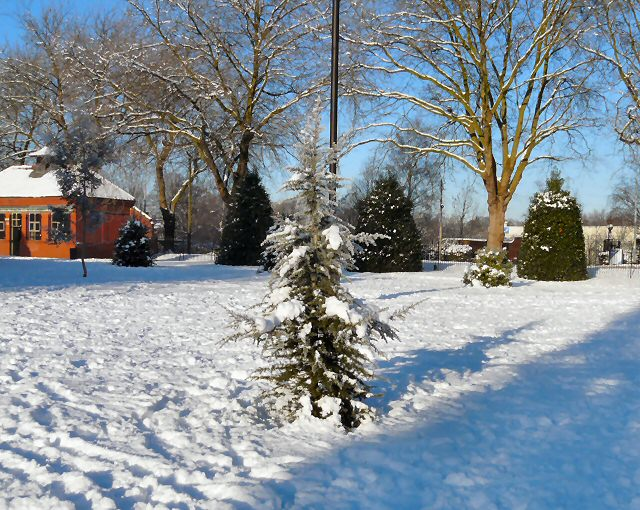
Looking towards New Bridge Lane from Vernon Park

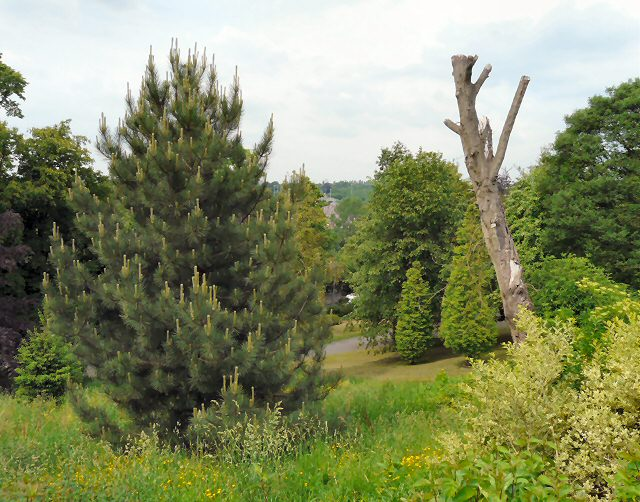

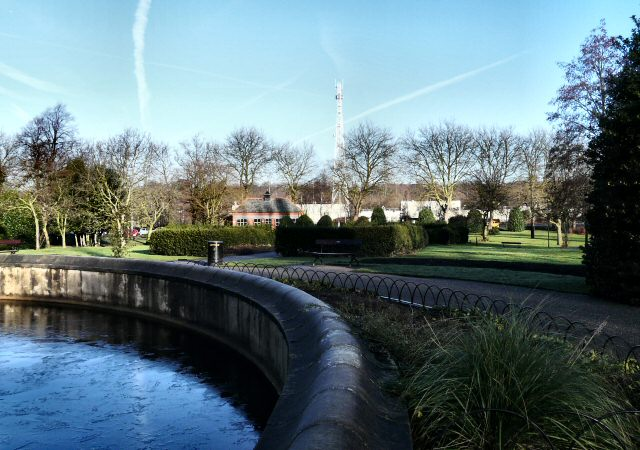
Looking from by the fountain pool towards New Bridge Lane

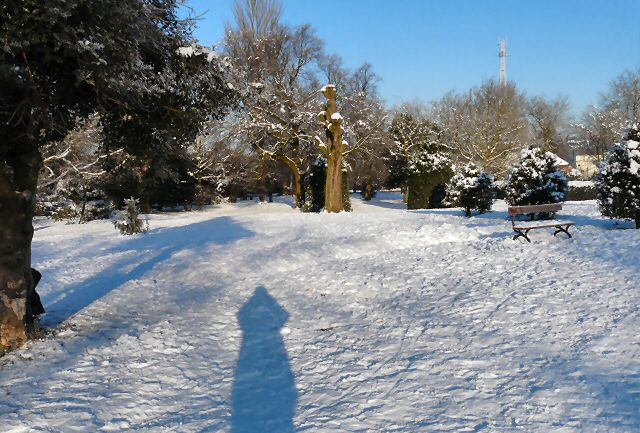
Looking towards New Bridge Lane

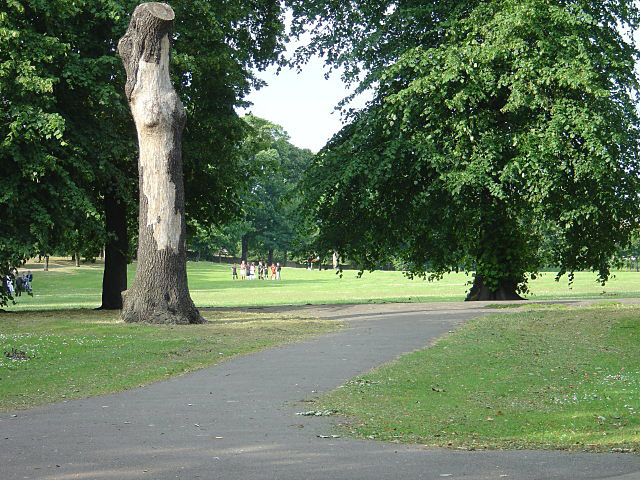
Looking through one of the avenues of mature lime trees

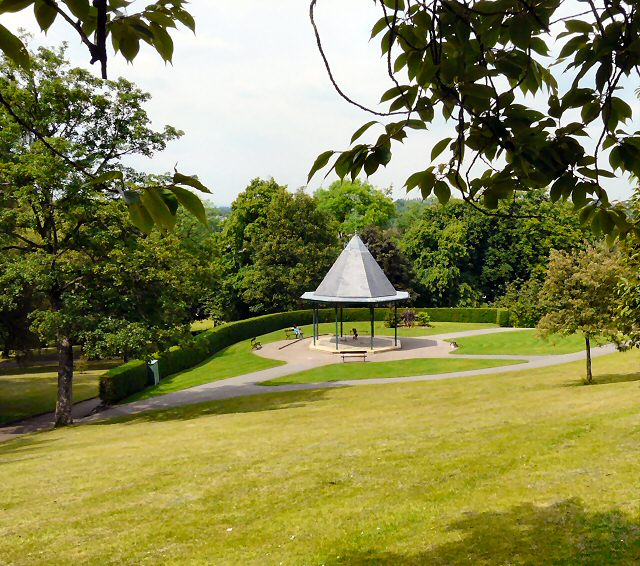
Vernon Park Bandstand

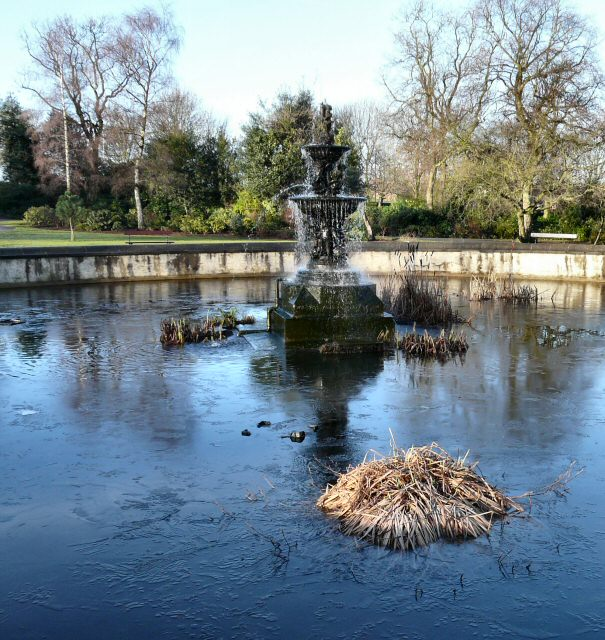
Vernon Park Fountain

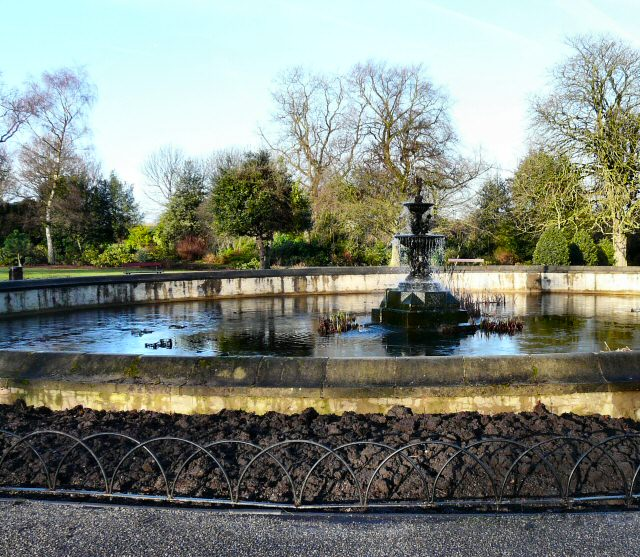
Vernon Park Fountain

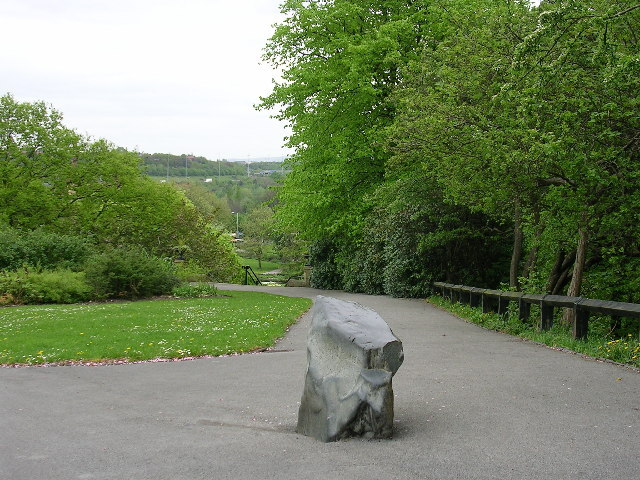
A glacial erratic (from the Lake District)

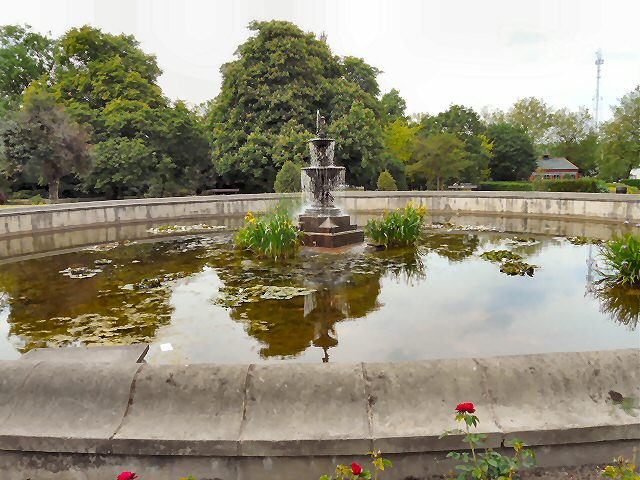
Vernon Park Fountain

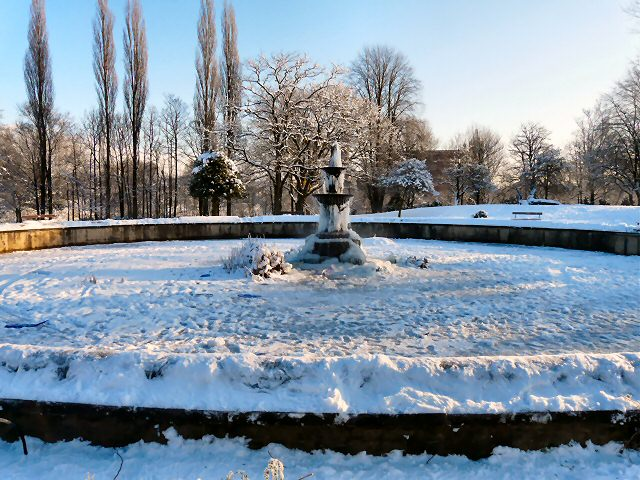
Vernon Park Fountain

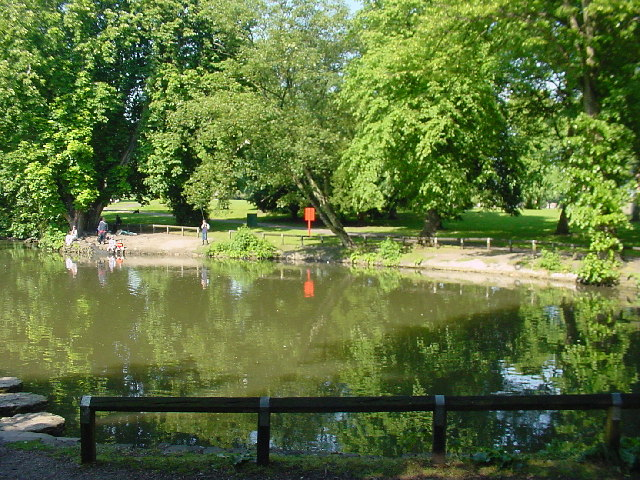
Vernon Park Lake
