= Falinge Park =

Park in Greater Manchester, England

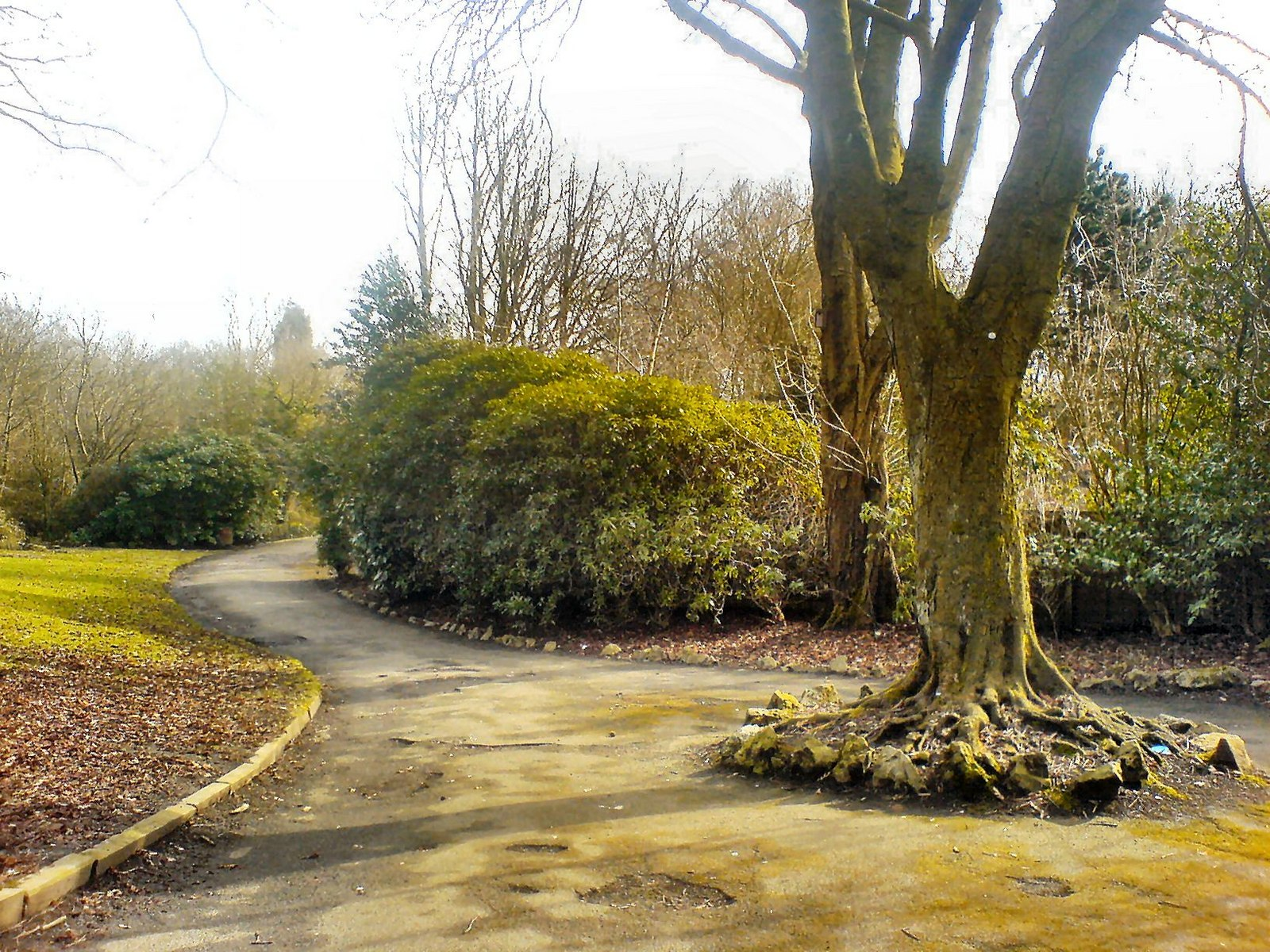
- Footpath crossing Falinge Park
- Interactive map of Falinge Park
- Location: Rochdale, Greater Manchester
- Nearest city: Manchester
- Coordinates: 53°37′26″N 2°09′55″W
- Area: 11 hectares (27 acres)
- Created: 1906
- Operator: Rochdale Borough Council
- Status: Grade II Historic England

Falinge Park is a Grade II listed public park located in Rochdale, Greater Manchester. Opened to the public in 1906, it lies in the historic grounds of the 18th century Falinge Hall.

== History ==
Falinge Hall and grounds were built in the late 18th century and offered to the Corporation in 1894 for £3,628 in order to turn it into a public park. The plans were submitted in 1902, by which time Falinge Hall was in a dilapidated condition. Parts of the hall were subsequently demolished. The new park was designed by architect Thomas Hayton Mawson and opened to the public in 1906. It was extended to the north and east in 1911 to celebrate the coronation of King George V the following year.

== Today ==
The park lies in a residential area approximately one mile northwest of the town centre and covers an area of 11 hectares. The remains of Falinge Hall are the main structures in the park and are located in the central area. The southern half of the park is dominated by sweeping lawns while the northern part is home to formal gardens and a pond.

Facilities include a bandstand, a children's play area and bowling greens.
