= List of churches in the United Reformed Church =

This is a list of churches in the United Reformed Church denomination in the United Kingdom. In 1972, the Presbyterian Church of England united with the Congregational Church in England and Wales to form the United Reformed Church (URC).

The 2022 General Assembly report wrote, "As a denomination, we are a small fraction of who and what we were in 1972 – we have about a fifth of the membership we had on our formation, and the number of churches has fallen from a little over 2,000 to a little under 1,300. We have about three-fifths the number of churches compared with one-fifth of the membership. These churches are served by 390 Ministers (Stipendiary and Non-Stipendiary), compared to 1,844 in 1972. Again, the 'workforce' of Ministers of Word and Sacrament is about one-fifth of the number 50 years ago."

== Synods ==
Synod	Web	Locations covered	Churches (May 2024)	Churches (2000)	Change (%)
East Midlands		Bedfordshire (north), Buckinghamshire (Milton Keynes area), Cambridgeshire (Peterborough area), Derbyshire (except far NW), Leicestershire, Lincolnshire (including N and NE Lincs), Northamptonshire, Nottinghamshire	109	144	-24.3%
Eastern		Cambridgeshire (except Peterborough), Essex, Hertfordshire (far east), Norfolk, Suffolk	110	148	-25.7%
Mersey		Cheshire (except Macclesfield), Greater Manchester (west), Isle of Man, Lancashire (extreme south), Merseyside	72	92	-21.7%
Northern		Durham, North Yorkshire (north), Northumberland, Tyne and Wear	52	86	-39.5%
North Western		Cheshire (Macclesfield area), Cumbria, Derbyshire (extreme NW), Lancashire (except extreme S), Greater Manchester (east)	102	150	-32.0%
Scotland		Scotland	39	53	-26.4%
South Western		Bristol, Cornwall, Devon, Gloucestershire (south), Somerset, Wiltshire (except south-east)	89	125	-28.8%
Southern		East Sussex, Kent, London (south), Surrey (east), West Sussex	133	167	-20.4%
Thames North		Bedfordshire (except far north), Berkshire (Slough area), Buckinghamshire (south-east), Hertfordshire (except far east), London (north)	105	135	-20.4%
Wales		Wales	74	113*	-34.5%
Wessex		Berkshire (except Slough), Buckinghamshire (west), Channel Islands, Dorset, Hampshire, Isle of Wight, Oxfordshire, Surrey (west), Wiltshire (except south-east)	106	144	-26.4%
West Midlands		Gloucestershire (except south), Herefordshire, Shropshire, Staffordshire, Warwickshire, West Midlands, Worcestershire	90	136	-33.8%
Yorkshire		East Riding of Yorkshire, North Yorkshire (except north), South Yorkshire, West Yorkshire	79	107	-26.2%
Total			1,160	1,600	-27.5%

*Challenge to Change, the report of a Welsh Churches Survey conducted by the Bible Society in 1995, showed that there were 140 United Reformed chapels.

== East Midlands Synod ==
Church	Location	Founded	Denomination
Abbots Road URC, Leicester	Leicester, Leicestershire	1929	URC
Abington Avenue URC, Northampton	Northampton, Northamptonshire	pre-1901	URC
All Saints, Milton Keynes Village	Middleton, Milton Keynes	c. 1200	CoE / Baptist / Methodist / URC
All Saints, Loughton	Loughton, Milton Keynes	C13th	CoE / Baptist / Methodist / URC
Alvaston URC	Alvaston, Derbyshire		URC
Arnold URC	Arnold, Nottinghamshire		URC
Ashbourne Road Church, Derby	Derby, Derbyshire		Methodist / URC
Bardon Park URC	Bardon, Leicestershire	1662	URC
Belgrave Union Church	Belgrave, Leicestershire		Baptist / URC
Boston URC	Wyberton, Lincolnshire		URC
Boulevard URC, Nottingham	Hyson Green, Nottinghamshire	1824	URC
Braunstone URC	Braunstone, Leicestershire		URC
Brigstock URC	Brigstock, Northamptonshire		URC
Bulwell URC	Bulwell, Nottinghamshire	1911	URC
Buxton URC	Buxton, Derbyshire		URC
Calow URC	Calow, Derbyshire		URC
Castle Hill URC, Northampton	Northampton, Northamptonshire	1662	URC
Central URC, Derby	Derby, Derbyshire	1778	URC
Christ Church URC, Leicester	Leicester, Leicestershire	1931	URC
Christ Church, Stantonbury	Stantonbury, Milton Keynes	1975	CoE / Baptist / Methodist / URC
Christ Church in Orton Goldhay	Orton Goldhay, Cambridgeshire		CoE / Methodist / URC
Christ the Cornerstone, Milton Keynes	Central Milton Keynes	1979	CoE / Baptist / Methodist / URC
Christ the King, Kents Hill	Kents Hill, Milton Keynes	1993	CoE / Baptist / Methodist / URC
Christ the Vine Community Church	Woughton, Milton Keynes		CoE / Baptist / Methodist / URC
Christ Church, Grantham	Grantham, Lincolnshire		Methodist / URC
Church Without Walls, Walton	Walton, Milton Keynes	2013	CoE / Baptist / Methodist / URC
The Servant King, Furzton	Furzton, Milton Keynes		CoE / Baptist / Methodist / URC
Corby URC	Corby, Northamptonshire		URC
Cowper Memorial URC, Olney	Olney, Milton Keynes		URC
Creaton URC	Creaton, Northamptonshire	1694	URC
Crick URC	Crick, Northamptonshire		URC
Cross and Stable, Downs Barn	Stantonbury, Milton Keynes		CoE / Baptist / Methodist / URC
Daventry URC	Daventry, Northamptonshire		URC
Dean URC	Upper Dean, Bedfordshire		URC
Desborough URC	Desborough, Northamptonshire		URC
Doddridge Memorial URC, Northampton	Northampton, Northamptonshire	1911	URC
Duston URC	Duston, Northamptonshire	1923	URC
Eastgate Union Church, Louth	Louth, Lincolnshire		Baptist / URC
Eastwood URC	Eastwood, Nottinghamshire		URC
Enderby URC	Enderby, Leicestershire		URC
Flore URC	Flore, Northamptonshire	1797	URC
Fountain Square Church, Tideswell	Tideswell, Derbyshire		Methodist / URC
Gainsborough URC	Gainsborough, Lincolnshire	1776	URC
Grimsby URC	Grimsby, Lincolnshire		URC
Groby URC	Groby, Leicestershire	mid-C19th	URC
Harrold URC	Harrold, Bedfordshire		CoE / URC
Haven Christian Centre, Heatherton	Littleover, Derbyshire	1993	CoE / Baptist / Methodist / URC
High Street URC, Wellingborough	Wellingborough, Northamptonshire	1660s	URC
Hinckley URC	Hinckley, Leicestershire	1662	URC
Holy Trinity, Woolstone	Woolstone, Milton Keynes	C13th	CoE / Baptist / Methodist / URC
Holymoorside URC	Holymoorside, Derbyshire	1852	URC
Hucknall URC	Hucknall, Nottinghamshire	1892	URC
Ilkeston URC	Ilkeston, Derbyshire		URC
Keyworth URC	Keyworth, Nottinghamshire		URC
Little Eaton URC	Little Eaton, Derbyshire		URC
London Road URC, Kettering	Kettering, Northamptonshire	1892	URC
Long Buckby URC	Long Buckby, Northamptonshire	1707	URC
Long Eaton URC	Long Eaton, Derbyshire		URC
Loughborough URC	Loughborough, Leicestershire	1828	URC
Mackworth URC	Mackworth, Derbyshire		URC
Marlpool URC	Heanor, Derbyshire	late C18th	URC
Matlock Methodist & URC	Matlock, Derbyshire		Methodist / URC
Melbourne URC	Melbourne, Derbyshire	mid C18th	URC
Melton Mowbray with Freeby URC	Melton Mowbray, Leicestershire	1821	URC
Newport Pagnell URC	Newport Pagnell, Milton Keynes	1660	URC
Oadby URC	Oadby, Leicestershire		URC
Old Brumby United Church, Scunthorpe	Scunthorpe, East Riding of Yorkshire		Methodist / URC
Potterspury and Yardley Gobion URC	Yardley Gobion, Northamptonshire		URC
Repton URC	Repton, Derbyshire		URC
Riverside Church, Sleaford	Sleaford, Lincolnshire	1776	URC
Saffron Lane URC, Leicester	Leicester, Leicestershire		URC
Sherwood URC	Sherwood, Nottinghamshire		URC
Sinfin Moor Church	Sinfin, Derbyshire	1970	CoE / Methodist / URC
South Wigston URC	South Wigston, Leicestershire		URC
Spalding URC	Spalding, Lincolnshire	1819	URC
St Andrew's URC, Chesterfield	Chesterfield, Derbyshire		URC
St Andrew's URC, Peterborough	Peterborough, Cambridgeshire	1861	URC
St Andrew's, Great Linford	Great Linford, Milton Keynes		CoE / Baptist / Methodist / URC
St Andrew's Community Church, Dronfield Woodhouse	Dronfield Woodhouse, Derbyshire	1971	CoE / Methodist / URC
St Andrew's with Castle Gate URC, Nottingham	Nottingham, Nottinghamshire	c. 1665	URC
St Columba's, Lincoln	Lincoln, Lincolnshire		Methodist / URC
St Giles', Tattenhoe	Tattenhoe, Milton Keynes	c. 1100	CoE / Baptist / Methodist / URC
St James', New Bradwell	New Bradwell, Milton Keynes		CoE / Baptist / Methodist / URC
St Lawrence's, Bradwell	Bradwell, Milton Keynes	C12th	CoE / Baptist / Methodist / URC
St Mary Magdalene's, Willen	Willen, Milton Keynes	1678	CoE / Baptist / Methodist / URC
St Mary's, Shenley Church End	Shenley Church End, Milton Keynes	C12th	CoE / Baptist / Methodist / URC
St Mary's, Wavendon	Wavendon, Milton Keynes	C13th	CoE / Baptist / Methodist / URC
St Mary's, Woughton on the Green	Old Woughton, Milton Keynes	C13th	CoE / Baptist / Methodist / URC
St Stephen's URC, Leicester	Leicester, Leicestershire		URC
St Thomas', Simpson	Simpson, Milton Keynes	C13th	CoE / Baptist / Methodist / URC
Stamford URC	Stamford, Lincolnshire	C17th	URC
Holy Cross, Two Mile Ash	Two Mile Ash, Milton Keynes		CoE / Baptist / Methodist / URC
The Church on Oakwood	Oakwood, Derbyshire	1986	CoE / Methodist / URC
The Crossing Church, Worksop	Worksop, Nottinghamshire		Methodist / URC
The Dales URC, Bakersfield	Bakersfield, Nottinghamshire	1930	URC
The Headlands URC, Northampton	Northampton, Northamptonshire		URC
Toller URC, Kettering	Kettering, Northamptonshire	1662	URC
Trinity Church, Fishermead	Fishermead, Milton Keynes		CoE / Baptist / Methodist / URC
Trinity URC, Lincoln	Lincoln, Lincolnshire		URC
Weedon URC	Weedon Bec, Northamptonshire		URC
Well Street United Church, Buckingham	Buckingham, Buckinghamshire		Baptist / Methodist / URC
West Derbyshire URC	Wirksworth, Derbyshire		URC
West End United Church, Wolverton	Wolverton, Milton Keynes		Methodist / URC
Westgate New Church, Peterborough	Peterborough, Cambridgeshire	1776	Methodist / URC
Whetstone URC	Whetstone, Leicestershire		URC
Queen Street Church, Whittlesey	Whittlesey, Cambridgeshire		Methodist / URC
Wigston Magna URC	Wigston, Leicestershire	C17th	URC
Wycliffe URC, Evington	Evington, Leicestershire		URC
Yardley Hastings URC	Yardley Hastings, Northamptonshire		URC

=== Former URC churches in East Midlands Synod ===
Church	Location	Founded	Closed	Notes
Anstey URC	Anstey, Leicestershire	1851	2021	
Badby URC	Badby, Northamptonshire	1873	2021	
Burton Joyce Community Church	Burton Joyce, Nottinghamshire	1869	2022	Methodist / URC
Carlton Road URC, Derby	Derby, Derbyshire	1932	2024	
Carr Vale URC, Chesterfield	Carr Vale, Derbyshire		2008	
Castle Square URC, Wisbech	Wisbech, Cambridgeshire	1818	2023	
Chaddesden URC	Chaddesden, Derbyshire	1920	2015	
Church of Reconciliation, Westcliff	Scunthorpe, Lincolnshire	1976	2008	CoE / Methodist / URC
Clifton URC, Nottingham	Clifton, Nottinghamshire	c. 1950	2019	
Danesholme Community Church	Corby, Northamptonshire	1974	2017	Baptist / URC
Earl Shilton URC	Earl Shilton, Leicestershire	1810s	2023	
Eastgate URC, Bourne	Bourne, Lincolnshire	1846	2024	
Emmanuel URC, Leicester	Leicester, Leicestershire	C19th	2005	
Ermine URC, Lincoln	Lincoln, Lincolnshire	1956	2023	
Evington Road URC, Leicester	Leicester, Leicestershire	1909	2013	
Friary URC, West Bridgford	West Bridgford, Nottinghamshire	1897	2022	
Geddington URC	Geddington, Northamptonshire	1876	2024	
Great Doddington URC	Great Doddington, Northamptonshire	1691	2023	
Headlands URC, Northampton	Northampton, Northamptonshire	1944	2021	
Hill Top URC, Dronfield	Dronfield, Derbyshire	pre-1896	2015	
Hodge Lea United Church	Wolverton, Milton Keynes	1979	2006	CoE / Baptist / Methodist / URC
Horncastle URC	Horncastle, Lincolnshire	1781	2002	
Kilby URC	Kilby, Leicestershire	1887	2019	
Kilsby URC	Kilsby, Northamptonshire	1662	2024	
Langley Community Church	Heanor, Derbyshire	1848	2019	
Long Sutton URC	Long Sutton, Lincolnshire	1817	2008	
Lutterworth URC	Lutterworth, Leicestershire	1689	2021	
Moorgreen URC	Moorgreen, Nottinghamshire	1662	2004	
Netherfield URC	Netherfield, Nottinghamshire	1841	2009	
Paulerspury URC	Paulerspury, Northamptonshire	1826	2021	
Rose Hill URC, Chesterfield	Chesterfield, Derbyshire	1662	2023	
Rothwell URC	Rothwell, Northamptonshire	1655	2022	
Sutton in Ashfield URC	Sutton in Ashfield, Nottinghamshire	1670	2023	
Thurnby and Bushby URC	Bushby, Leicestershire	1908	2015	
Westcotes URC, Leicester	Leicester, Leicestershire	1906	2021	URC
Westwood URC	Jacksdale, Nottinghamshire	1867	2018	
Wootton Trinity Christian Centre	Wootton, Northamptonshire		c. 2011	URC involvement ended, continues as a Methodist church

== Eastern Synod ==
Church	Location	Founded	Denomination
Bar Hill Church	Bar Hill, Cambridgeshire	1967	CoE / Baptist / Methodist / URC
Basildon & Pitsea URC	Basildon, Essex		URC
Bassingbourn URC	Bassingbourn, Cambridgeshire		URC
Billericay URC	Billericay, Essex	1672	URC
Water Lane URC, Bishop's Stortford	Bishop's Stortford, Hertfordshire	1662	URC
Bocking URC	Bocking, Essex		URC
Bowthorpe Church	Bowthorpe, Norfolk	1984	CoE / Baptist / Methodist / URC
Bramerton Road Community Church	Hockley, Essex	1926	URC
Bridgwater Drive Church	Southend-on-Sea, Essex		CoE / URC
Burnham-on-Crouch URC	Burnham-on-Crouch, Essex		Methodist / URC
Bury St Edmunds URC	Bury St Edmunds, Suffolk	1646	URC
Cambourne Church	Cambourne, Cambridgeshire	2001	CoE / Baptist / Methodist / URC
Castle Camps URC	Castle Camps, Cambridgeshire		URC
Castle Hill URC, Ipswich	Ipswich, Suffolk	1957	URC
Chappel URC	Chappel, Essex	1901	URC
Cheveley URC	Cheveley, Cambridgeshire		URC
Chignal Smealey URC	Chignal Smealey, Essex		URC
Christ Church URC, Clacton-on-Sea	Clacton-on-Sea, Essex	1885	URC
Christ Church URC, Chelmsford	Chelmsford, Essex		URC
Christ Church URC, Southminster	Southminster, Essex		URC
Christ Church URC, Buntingford	Buntingford, Hertfordshire	1776	URC
Christ Church, Ipswich	Ipswich, Suffolk	1686	Baptist / URC
Christ Church, Braintree	Braintree, Essex		Methodist / URC
Christ Church, Wickford	Wickford, Essex		Methodist / URC
Christ Church, Needham Market	Needham Market, Suffolk	1662	Methodist / URC
Christ Church, Newmarket	Newmarket, Suffolk		Methodist / URC
Church Langley Church	Church Langley, Essex	1993	CoE / Baptist / Methodist / URC
Clare URC	Clare, Suffolk		URC
Clavering Church	Clavering, Essex		CoE / Methodist / URC
Cloverfield Community Church	Thetford, Norfolk		CoE / URC
Christ Church, Coggeshall	Coggeshall, Essex		Baptist / Methodist / URC
Kings Road URC, Southend	Southend-on-Sea, Essex		URC
Danbury Chapel URC	Danbury, Essex	1937	URC
Debenham URC	Debenham, Suffolk		URC
Denton Church	Denton, Norfolk		CoE / URC
Diss URC	Diss, Norfolk		URC
Dovercourt Central Church	Dovercourt, Essex	1689	Methodist / URC
Downing Place URC, Cambridge	Cambridge, Cambridgeshire	1687	URC
Emmanuel, Bungay	Bungay, Suffolk		Methodist / URC
Emmanuel Church Walton	Walton-on-the-Naze, Essex		Methodist / URC
Emmanuel, Chatteris	Chatteris, Cambridgeshire		Methodist / URC
Epping URC	Epping, Essex	1625	URC
Felixstowe URC	Felixstowe, Suffolk	1869	URC
Felsted URC	Felsted, Essex		URC
Fenstanton URC	Fenstanton, Cambridgeshire	1874	URC
Framlingham United Free Church	Framlingham, Suffolk	1662	Methodist / URC
Fulbourn URC	Fulbourn, Cambridgeshire		URC
Grays URC	Grays, Essex		URC
Great Chishill with Barley URC	Great Chishill, Cambridgeshire	1694	URC
Great Totham URC	Great Totham, Essex		URC
Great Meeting URC, Hadleigh	Hadleigh, Suffolk		URC
Halesworth and Bramfield URC	Halesworth, Suffolk		URC
Halstead URC	Halstead, Essex		URC
London Road Church, Harleston	Harleston, Suffolk		Methodist / URC
Hatfield Heath URC	Hatfield Heath, Essex		URC
Howe Green URC	Howe Green, Essex	1873	URC
Hungate Church, Beccles	Beccles, Suffolk	1652	Methodist / URC
Hutton and Shenfield Union Church	Hutton Mount, Essex	1912	Baptist / URC
Ingatestone URC	Ingatestone, Essex	1812	URC
Ipswich Road URC, Norwich	Norwich, Norfolk	1952	URC
Kelvedon URC	Kelvedon, Essex		URC
Leaside Church	Ware, Hertfordshire	1814	Methodist / URC
Leiston United Church	Leiston, Suffolk		Methodist / URC
Linton Free Church	Linton, Cambridgeshire	1690s	URC
Little Baddow Chapel URC	Little Baddow, Essex	1662	URC
Little Waltham URC	Little Waltham, Essex	1803	URC
Lion Walk URC, Colchester	Colchester, Essex	1642	URC
Maldon URC	Maldon, Essex	1696	URC
Melbourn URC	Melbourn, Cambridgeshire	1694	URC
Mendlesham URC	Mendlesham, Suffolk		URC
Monks Eleigh URC	Monks Eleigh, Suffolk		URC
North Lowestoft URC	Lowestoft, Suffolk		URC
The Old Independent URC, Haverhill	Haverhill, Suffolk	1662	URC
Ongar URC	Ongar, Essex	1662	URC
Plume Avenue Church, Colchester	Colchester, Essex		URC
Christ Church URC, Rayleigh	Rayleigh, Essex	1910	URC
Roydon URC	Roydon, Essex	1798	URC
Abbey Lane & Newport URC, Saffron Walden	Saffron Walden, Essex	1665	URC
Sawston Free Church	Sawston, Cambridgeshire	C18th	Methodist / URC
Saxmundham URC	Saxmundham, Suffolk		URC
Southchurch Park URC, Southend	Southend-on-Sea, Essex	1893	URC
Southgate Church, Bury St Edmunds	Bury St Edmunds, Suffolk	1970s	CoE / Baptist / URC
Southwold URC	Southwold, Suffolk	1672	URC
St Augustine of Canterbury, North Springfield	Chelmsford, Essex		CoE / Methodist / URC
St John's URC, Ipswich	Ipswich, Suffolk	1853	URC
St Luke, Cambridge	Cambridge, Cambridgeshire		CoE / URC
St Neots URC	St Neots, Cambridgeshire	pre-1888	URC
St Peter's Jessopp Road Church, Norwich	Norwich, Norfolk		Methodist / URC
Stansted Free Church	Stansted Mountfitchet, Essex	1687	Methodist / URC
Stetchworth URC	Stetchworth, Suffolk		URC
Stowmarket URC	Stowmarket, Suffolk	c. 1719	URC
Stowupland URC	Stowupland, Suffolk		URC
Thaxted URC	Thaxted, Essex		URC
The Church in Great Notley	Great Notley, Essex	c. 2000	CoE / Baptist / Methodist / URC
Church of Our Saviour, Chelmer	Chelmer Village, Essex		CoE / URC
The Cornerstone URC, Southend	Southend-on-Sea, Essex		URC
St Ives Free Church	St Ives, Cambridgeshire	1630s	URC
Tiptree URC	Tiptree, Essex	1664	URC
Trinity Church, Burwell	Burwell, Cambridgeshire		Methodist / URC
Trinity Church, March	March, Cambridgeshire		Methodist / URC
Union Church, Hunstanton	Hunstanton, Norfolk	1860s	Baptist / URC
Brightlingsea United Church	Brightlingsea, Essex		Methodist / URC
Wattisfield URC	Wattisfield, Norfolk		URC
Whittlesford URC	Whittlesford, Cambridgeshire		Methodist / URC?
Witham URC	Witham, Essex		URC
Wortwell URC	Wortwell, Norfolk		URC
Wrentham Chapel	Wrentham, Suffolk		URC
Wroxham and Hoveton URC	Wroxham, Norfolk		URC
Fairland URC, Wymondham	Wymondham, Norfolk	1652	URC
Holy Trinity, South Woodham Ferrers	South Woodham Ferrers, Essex		Methodist / URC

=== Former URC churches in Eastern Synod ===
Church	Location	Founded	Closed	Notes
Aveley URC	Aveley, Essex	1817	2002	
Brentwood URC	Brentwood, Essex	late C17th	2023	
Castle Hedingham URC	Castle Hedingham, Essex	c. 1622	2016	
Cavendish URC	Cavendish, Suffolk	1703	2017	
Christ Church, Great Yarmouth	Great Yarmouth, Norfolk	pre-1989	2024	Methodist / URC
Christ Church URC, Colchester	Colchester, Essex	1843	2023	
Christ Church URC, Sudbury	Sudbury, Suffolk	C17th	2018	
Claydon Old Chapel	Claydon, Suffolk	1840s	2006	
Cowlinge URC	Cowlinge, Suffolk	c. 1825	2005	
David Livingstone URC, Harlow	Harlow, Essex	1955	2020	
Duxford URC	Duxford, Cambridgeshire	1792	2019	
Eastwood URC, Southend-on-Sea	Southend-on-Sea, Essex	1927	2015	
Emmanuel URC, Cambridge	Cambridge, Cambridgeshire	1687	2017	Merged with St Columba's URC, Cambridge, to form Downing Place URC
The Independent Chapel URC, Finchingfield	Finchingfield, Essex	1662	2014	
Fowlmere URC	Fowlmere, Cambridgeshire	1754	2024	
Great Baddow URC	Great Baddow, Essex	1814	2020	
Gorleston URC	Gorleston-on-Sea, Norfolk	1812	2007	
Harwich Road URC, Colchester	Colchester, Essex	1840	2005	
Haughley URC	Haughley, Suffolk	1835	2005	
High Easter URC	High Easter, Essex	1843	2010	
Houghton Chapel Centre	Houghton, Cambridgeshire		c. 2009	
Little Abington URC	Little Abington, Cambridgeshire	1888	2019	
Long Melford URC	Long Melford, Suffolk	1662	2021	
Mattishall URC	Mattishall, Suffolk	1772	2016	
New Street URC, Dunmow	Great Dunmow, Essex	1662	2024	
North Avenue URC, Chelmsford	Chelmsford, Essex	1928	2018	
Princes Street URC, Norwich	Norwich, Norfolk	1819	2020	
Shipdham United Church	Shipdham, Norfolk	1832	2019	Methodist / URC
South Ockendon URC	South Ockendon, Essex	1812	2001	
St Columba's URC, Cambridge	Cambridge, Cambridgeshire	c.1881	2017	Merged with Emmanuel URC, Cambridge, to form Downing Place URC
Terling URC	Terling, Essex	1624	2017	
Thetford URC	Thetford, Norfolk	pre-1817	2024	
Tolleshunt d'Arcy URC	Tolleshunt D'Arcy, Essex	1881	1999	
Trent Road URC, Chelmsford	Chelmsford, Essex	mid-1950s	2014	
Trinity URC, Harlow	Harlow, Essex	1956	2021	
Trinity URC, Norwich	Norwich, Norfolk	1867	2024	
Wethersfield URC	Wethersfield, Essex	1662	2010	
Wickhambrook URC	Wickhambrook, Suffolk	1670	2021	
Woodbridge URC	Woodbridge, Suffolk	1651	c. 2009	
Writtle URC	Writtle, Essex	1672	2019	

== Mersey Synod ==
Church	Location	Founded	Denomination
Ainsdale Village Church	Ainsdale, Merseyside	1878	Baptist / URC
Allerton URC	Allerton, Merseyside	1932	URC
Alsager URC	Alsager, Cheshire		URC
Hallwood Ecumenical Parish, Runcorn	Runcorn, Cheshire		CoE / Methodist / URC
Birkdale URC	Birkdale, Merseyside		URC
Blacon URC	Blacon, Cheshire		URC
Caldy Valley Neighbourhood Church	Great Boughton, Cheshire		Methodist / URC
Caradoc Mission, Seaforth	Seaforth, Merseyside		URC
Castle Community Church, Northwich	Northwich, Cheshire	1881	Methodist / URC
Chadwick Mount URC, Everton	Everton, Merseyside		URC
Chester Road URC, Ellesmere Port	Ellesmere Port, Cheshire		URC
Christ Church URC, Haydock	Haydock, Merseyside	1891	URC
Christ Church URC, Port Sunlight	Port Sunlight, Merseyside	1904	URC
Churchtown Village Church	Churchtown, Merseyside	1807	URC
Congleton URC	Congleton, Cheshire	1662	URC
Cross Lane United Church	Newton-le-Willows, Merseyside		Methodist / URC
Elmwood Avenue URC, Warrington	Warrington, Cheshire		URC
Emmanuel, Ormskirk	Ormskirk, Lancashire	1806	Methodist / URC
Eshe Road URC, Crosby	Crosby, Merseyside	1885	URC
Formby URC	Formby, Merseyside	1881	URC
Garston Park Church	Garston, Merseyside		Methodist / URC
Grange URC, Bebington	Bebington, Merseyside		URC
Haresfinch URC	St Helens, Merseyside		URC
Haslington and Crewe URC	Haslington, Cheshire		URC
Heswall URC	Heswall, Merseyside	1895	URC
Higher Bebington URC	Bebington, Merseyside	1951	URC
Highfield URC, Rock Ferry	Rock Ferry, Merseyside	1871	URC
Hoole URC	Hoole, Cheshire	1880s	URC
Huyton URC	Huyton, Merseyside		URC
Lord Street West United Church, Southport	Southport, Merseyside		Methodist / URC
Lymm URC	Lymm, Cheshire	1863	URC
High Street Church, Malpas	Malpas, Cheshire		Methodist / URC
Marlowe Road URC, Liscard	Liscard, Merseyside	1909	URC
Queen Street URC, Middlewich	Middlewich, Cheshire		URC
Market Street Church, Nantwich	Nantwich, Cheshire	1653	Baptist / URC
Newtown URC	St Helens, Merseyside		URC
Ormskirk Street URC, St Helens	St Helens, Merseyside	1613	URC
Over URC, Winsford	Over, Cheshire	1805	URC
Parkgate and Neston URC	Neston, Cheshire		URC
Peasley Cross URC, St Helens	St Helens, Merseyside		URC
Prenton URC	Prenton, Merseyside	1887	URC
Rainford URC	Rainford, Merseyside		URC
Rock Chapel URC, Farndon	Farndon, Cheshire		URC
Seacombe URC	Seacombe, Merseyside	1862	URC
Serpentine Road Family Church, Wallasey	Wallasey, Merseyside		URC
St Andrew's URC, Meols	Meols, Merseyside	1894	URC
St Andrew's URC, Douglas	Douglas, Isle of Man	1825	URC
St Columba's URC, Liverpool	Hunt's Cross, Merseyside	1942	URC
St David's URC, Eastham	Eastham, Merseyside	1942	URC
St George's URC, Maghull	Maghull, Merseyside		URC
St James', South Woolton	Woolton, Merseyside		Methodist / URC
St John's URC, Warrington	Warrington, Cheshire	1796	URC
St Paul's Road Mission, Rock Ferry	Rock Ferry, Merseyside	1856	URC
St Stephen's URC, Wavertree	Wavertree, Merseyside		URC
The Church at the centre, Skelmersdale	Skelmersdale, Lancashire		CoE / Baptist / Methodist / URC
The Uniting Church in Garden Lane	Chester, Cheshire		Methodist / URC
Thomas Risley URC, Birchwood	Birchwood, Cheshire		URC
Toll Bar with Prescot URC	St Helens, Merseyside		URC
Trinity Church, Skelmersdale	Skelmersdale, Lancashire		Methodist / URC
Trinity URC, Wigan	Wigan, Greater Manchester	1785	URC
Trinity URC, Ramsey	Ramsey, Isle of Man	pre-1844	URC
Trinity with Palm Grove Church, Claughton	Claughton, Merseyside	1865	Methodist / URC
Tunley URC	Wrightington, Lancashire		URC
Upton-by-Chester URC	Upton-by-Chester, Cheshire	1858	URC
Vicars Cross URC	Vicars Cross, Cheshire	1768	URC
Wallasey Village URC	Wallasey, Merseyside	1860	URC
St Andrew's United Church, New Brighton	New Brighton, Merseyside	1863	Methodist / URC
Waterloo United Free Church, Crosby	Crosby, Merseyside		Baptist / URC
West Kirby URC	West Kirby, Merseyside	1882	URC
Wycliffe URC, Warrington	Warrington, Cheshire	1797	URC

=== Former URC churches in Mersey Synod ===
Church	Location	Founded	Closed	Notes
Beechwood West Church	Runcorn, Cheshire	1996	2014	CoE / Methodist / URC. Part of Hallwood Parish (see above)
Blundellsands URC	Blundellsands, Merseyside	1897	2019	
Earle Road URC, Liverpool	Liverpool, Merseyside	1883	2007	
Ecclestone URC	Eccleston, Merseyside	1934	2004	
Hamilton Memorial URC, Birkenhead	Birkenhead, Merseyside	1868	2022	
Hampton Road URC, Southport	Southport, Merseyside	1889	2009	
Minshull Vernon URC	Minshull Vernon, Cheshire	1806	2021	
Oakvale URC	Liverpool, Merseyside	1913	2024	
The Rock Church Centre, Liverpool	Everton, Merseyside	1972	2006	
Salem URC, Orrell	Orrell, Greater Manchester	1804	2017	
St Andrew's URC (former Pres. Ch.), Handbridge	Handbridge, Cheshire	1845	2005	
St Andrew's URC (former Cong. Ch.), Handbridge	Handbridge, Cheshire	1876	2020	
St George's URC, Little Sutton	Little Sutton, Cheshire	1836	2020	
St George's URC, Southport	Southport, Merseyside	pre-1873	2023	
St George's URC, Thornton Hough	Thornton Hough, Merseyside	1907	2021	
St Stephen's URC, Bootle	Bootle, Merseyside	1928	c. 2013	
Stoneycroft URC	Stoneycroft, Merseyside	1897	2020	
Tranmere URC	Tranmere, Merseyside	1881	2013	
Trinity Church, Widnes	Widnes, Cheshire		2024	Methodist / URC
Union URC, Frodsham	Frodsham, Cheshire	1879	2005	
Upton URC	Upton, Merseyside	1899	2015	
Westminster Road URC, Liverpool	Liverpool, Merseyside	1866	2008	

== Northern Synod ==
Church	Location	Founded	Denomination
Bellingham Methodist / URC	Bellingham, Northumberland		Methodist / URC
Bethel URC, Chester-le-Street	Chester-le-Street, Durham		URC
Cromer Avenue URC, Gateshead	Gateshead, Tyne and Wear		URC
St Andrew's Dawson Street Methodist / URC	Crook, Durham	C18th	Methodist / URC
Denewell Avenue URC, Gateshead	Gateshead, Tyne and Wear		URC
Glanton URC	Glanton, Northumberland		URC
Great Bavington URC	Bavington, Northumberland		URC
Grindon Church Community Project	Grindon, Tyne and Wear	2014	URC
Guisborough URC	Guisborough, North Yorkshire		URC
St Cuthbert's Centre, Holy Island	Lindisfarne, Northumberland	1891	URC
Horsley Village Church	Horsley, Northumberland	1662	URC
Jesmond URC	Jesmond, Tyne and Wear		URC
Keld URC	Keld, North Yorkshire	1789	URC
Longframlington URC	Longframlington, Northumberland		URC
Low Row URC	Low Row, North Yorkshire	1690	URC
Northgate URC, Darlington	Darlington, Durham		URC
Ponteland URC	Ponteland, Northumberland		URC
Redcar URC	Redcar, North Yorkshire		URC
Robert Stewart Memorial URC, Fenham	Fenham, Tyne and Wear		URC
Roker URC	Roker, Tyne and Wear		URC
Rothbury URC	Rothbury, Northumberland	pre-1944	URC
Elsdon Avenue Church, Seaton Delaval	Seaton Delaval, Northumberland		Methodist / URC
St Aidan's URC, Hexham	Hexham, Northumberland		URC
St Andrew's, Benton	Benton, Tyne and Wear		Methodist / URC
St Andrew's & St Mark's, Newbiggin	Newbiggin-by-the-Sea, Northumberland		Methodist / URC
St Andrew's URC, Kenton	Kenton, Tyne and Wear	1955	URC
St Andrew's URC, Monkseaton	Monkseaton, Tyne and Wear	1932	URC
St Andrew's URC, Nunthorpe & Marton	Middlesbrough, North Yorkshire	1960s	URC
St Bede's URC, Sunderland	Sunderland, Tyne and Wear	1887	URC
St Columba's URC, North Shields	North Shields, Tyne and Wear	1662	URC
St Columba's URC, Billingham	Billingham, County Durham		URC
St Cuthbert's, Heaton	Heaton, Tyne and Wear		Methodist / URC
St George's URC, Hartlepool	Hartlepool, County Durham	1839	URC
St George's URC, Morpeth	Morpeth, Northumberland	1693	URC
St George's URC, High Heaton	High Heaton, Tyne and Wear		URC
St James's URC, Alnwick	Alnwick, Northumberland	1669	URC
St James's URC, Newcastle	Newcastle upon Tyne, Tyne and Wear	1684	URC
St John's, Kingston Park	Kingston Park, Tyne and Wear	1975	CoE / Baptist / Methodist / URC
St John's URC, Wideopen	Wideopen, Tyne and Wear		URC
St Margaret's URC, South Shields	South Shields, Tyne and Wear	1937	URC
St Mark's URC, Amble	Amble, Northumberland		URC
Stamfordham Uniting Church	Stamfordham, Northumberland		Methodist / URC
Stockton Road URC, Sunderland	Sunderland, Tyne and Wear	C18th	URC
Stockton-on-Tees URC	Stockton-on-Tees, County Durham		URC
Church of the Good Shepherd, Wallsend	Wallsend, Tyne and Wear		CoE / Methodist / URC
St Andrew's Mission, Thornaby	Thornaby-on-Tees, North Yorkshire		URC
Trinity Church Gosforth	Gosforth, Tyne and Wear		Methodist / URC
Trinity Church Ashington	Ashington, Northumberland		Methodist / URC
Trinity Church Bedlington	Bedlington, Northumberland		Methodist / URC
Waddington Street URC, Durham	Durham, Durham	1662	URC
Wark Methodist / URC	Wark on Tyne, Northumberland		Methodist / URC
West End URC, Newcastle	Fenham, Tyne and Wear	1931	URC
Widdrington URC	Widdrington, Northumberland	1765	URC
Wooler URC	Wooler, Northumberland		URC
Zion URC, Northallerton	Northallerton, North Yorkshire		URC

=== Former URC churches in Northern Synod ===
Church	Location	Founded	Closed	Notes
Barnard Castle URC	Barnard Castle, Durham	1808	2016	
Berwick-upon-Tweed URC	Berwick-upon-Tweed, Northumberland		2020	
Birdhopecraig URC	Rochester, Northumberland	C17th	2005	
Blyth URC	Blyth, Northumberland	pre-1777	2022	
Boldon URC	Boldon, Tyne and Wear	1823	2021	
Brighton Road URC, Gateshead	Gateshead, Tyne and Wear	1899	2009	
Chatton URC	Chatton, Northumberland	1698	2015	
Christ Church, North Broomhill	Broomhill, Northumberland	1932	2021	Methodist / URC
Christ Church URC, Stanley	Stanley, Durham	1895	2024	
Claypath URC, Durham	Durham, Durham	1689	2003	Morphed into an independent church
Crookham URC	Crookham, Northumberland	1732	2020	
Embleton URC	Embleton, Northumberland	1834	2005	
Erskine and St Cuthbert's URC, Belford	Belford, Northumberland	1776	2019	
Falstone and Kielder URC	Falstone, Northumberland	1709	2023	
Felton URC	Felton, Northumberland	1817	2016	
Grindon URC	Grindon, Tyne and Wear	1956	2013	Church closed but community project continues (see above)
Haltwhistle URC	Haltwhistle, Northumberland	C18th	2009	
Lingdale URC	Lingdale, North Yorkshire	1881	2015	
Linthorpe URC, Middlesbrough	Middlesbrough, North Yorkshire		c. 2011	
Loftus URC	Loftus, North Yorkshire	1827	2003	
Norton URC	Norton, Durham	1854	2005	
Oxclose Church, Washington	Washington, Tyne and Wear		2017	URC involvement ended, continues as a CoE church
Ryton URC	Ryton, Tyne and Wear	1837	2010	
Springfield Church Centre, Darlington	Darlington, Durham	1903	c. 2013	
St Andrew's URC, Blackhill	Consett, Durham	1857	2019	
St Andrew's URC, Hebburn	Hebburn, Tyne and Wear	1870	2021	
St Mark's, Coulby Newham	Coulby Newham, North Yorkshire	1978	2008	CoE / Methodist / URC
St Paul's & St John's URC, South Shields	South Shields, Tyne and Wear	1876	2021	
Trinity URC, Whitley Bay	Whitley Bay, Tyne and Wear	1895	2008	
Warkworth URC	Warkworth, Northumberland		2023	
West Denton URC	West Denton, Tyne and Wear	1930s	2022	Became West Denton Community Church (a plant from Christ Church Newcastle)
Winlaton Church	Winlaton, Tyne and Wear	1821	2015	Methodist / URC

== North Western Synod ==
Church	Location	Founded	Denomination
Adlington UR and Methodist Church	Adlington, Lancashire		Methodist / URC
Albion URC, Ashton-under-Lyne	Ashton-under-Lyne, Greater Manchester	1815	URC
Alkrington and Providence URC	Middleton, Greater Manchester		URC
Altrincham URC	Altrincham, Greater Manchester	C19th	URC
Ashton-on-Mersey URC	Ashton-on-Mersey, Greater Manchester		URC
Bamford Chapel & Norden URC	Bamford, Greater Manchester	1801	URC
Bank Top URC	Bolton, Greater Manchester	1830s	URC
Beulah Community Church, Hollinwood	Hollinwood, Greater Manchester		URC
Bewcastle URC	Bewcastle, Cumbria		URC
Bispham URC	Bispham, Lancashire		URC
Bramhall URC	Bramhall, Greater Manchester	1902	URC
Bury with Freetown URC	Bury, Greater Manchester	1792	URC
Carver Uniting Church	Windermere, Cumbria		Methodist / URC
Central URC, Darwen	Darwen, Lancashire	C17th	URC
Charlestown URC, Ashton-under-Lyne	Ashton-under-Lyne, Greater Manchester	1860s	URC
Cheadle Hulme URC	Cheadle Hulme, Greater Manchester	1869	URC
Chorley URC	Chorley, Lancashire		URC
Chorlton Central Church	Chorlton-cum-Hardy, Greater Manchester		Baptist / URC
Christ Church URC, Bolton-le-Sands	Bolton-le-Sands, Lancashire	1880s	URC
Christ Church, Longridge	Longridge, Lancashire		Methodist / URC
Christ Church, Little Lever	Little Lever, Greater Manchester	1810	Methodist / URC
Christ Church URC, South Manchester	Burnage, Greater Manchester		URC
Church at the centre, Tonge Moor	Bolton, Greater Manchester		URC
Clitheroe URC	Clitheroe, Lancashire	1862	URC
Cockermouth URC	Cockermouth, Cumbria	1651	URC
Dalton Community Church	Dalton-in-Furness, Cumbria		Methodist / URC
Deane URC	Deane, Greater Manchester		URC
Didsbury URC	Didsbury, Greater Manchester	1901	URC
Dundee URC, Ramsbottom	Ramsbottom, Greater Manchester		URC
Edgeley Community Church	Stockport, Greater Manchester		Methodist / URC
Egerton URC	Egerton, Greater Manchester		URC
Elswick Memorial URC	Elswick, Lancashire	1649	URC
Macedonia URC, Failsworth	Failsworth, Greater Manchester	1865	URC
Fairhaven URC	Lytham St Annes, Lancashire	1904	URC
Farnworth URC	Farnworth, Greater Manchester		URC
Fleetwood URC	Fleetwood, Lancashire		URC
Forton URC	Forton, Lancashire		URC
Garstang URC	Garstang, Lancashire	1777	URC
Gatley URC	Gatley, Greater Manchester		URC
George Lane URC, Woodley	Woodley, Greater Manchester		URC
Grange-over-Sands URC	Grange-over-Sands, Cumbria		URC
Trinity UR/Methodist Church, Great Harwood	Great Harwood, Lancashire	1747	Methodist / URC
Greenmount URC	Greenmount, Greater Manchester		URC
Hallfold URC, Whitworth	Whitworth, Lancashire		URC
Hambleton URC	Hambleton, Lancashire		URC
Hatherlow URC	Romiley, Greater Manchester	1645	URC
Heald Green URC	Heald Green, Greater Manchester		URC
Heaton Moor United Church	Heaton Moor, Greater Manchester		Methodist / URC
Hest Bank URC	Slyne-with-Hest, Lancashire	1850s	URC
Hope URC, Denton	Denton, Greater Manchester		URC
New Chapel URC, Horwich	Horwich, Greater Manchester		URC
Hurst Nook URC, Ashton-under-Lyne	Ashton-under-Lyne, Greater Manchester	1871	URC
Kendal URC	Kendal, Cumbria	1646	URC
Kirkham URC	Kirkham, Lancashire		URC
Inspire URC, Levenshulme	Levenshulme, Greater Manchester	1860s	URC
Leyland URC	Leyland, Lancashire	1846	URC
Lighthouse Community Church, Preesall	Preesall, Lancashire		Methodist / URC
Littleborough URC	Littleborough, Greater Manchester		URC
Macclesfield and Bollington URC	Macclesfield, Cheshire	1788	URC
Marple URC	Marple, Greater Manchester		URC
Marple Bridge URC	Marple Bridge, Greater Manchester		URC
Marton URC	Marton, Lancashire		URC
Shaw and Heyside URC	Shaw and Crompton, Greater Manchester		URC
Penwortham URC	Penwortham, Lancashire	1890s	URC
Poulton-le-Fylde URC	Poulton-le-Fylde, Lancashire		URC
Providence URC, New Mills	New Mills, Derbyshire	1823	URC
Radcliffe URC	Radcliffe, Greater Manchester		URC
Ramsden Street URC, Barrow-in-Furness	Barrow-in-Furness, Cumbria	1864	URC
Red Lane URC, Breightmet	Breightmet, Greater Manchester	1959	URC
Roby URC	Longsight, Greater Manchester		URC
Rose Hill URC	Bolton, Greater Manchester	1870	URC
Sefton Road URC, Morecambe	Morecambe, Lancashire		URC
Short Street URC, Hazel Grove	Hazel Grove, Greater Manchester		URC
St Andrew & St George's URC, Bolton	Bolton, Greater Manchester	1752	URC
St Andrew's, Rochdale	Rochdale, Greater Manchester		Methodist / URC
St Anne's-on-the-Sea URC	Lytham St Annes, Lancashire		URC
St George's URC, Carlisle	Carlisle, Cumbria		URC
St Paul's with St John's URC, Abbey Hey	Abbey Hey, Greater Manchester		URC
St Peter's, Manchester	Manchester, Greater Manchester	1974	CoE / Baptist / Methodist / URC
Stand URC	Stand, Greater Manchester		URC
Kingsway URC, Blackburn	Blackburn, Lancashire	1881	URC
The Dandelion Community	Wythenshawe, Greater Manchester		URC
The United Church, Hyde	Hyde, Greater Manchester		Baptist / URC
The United Church, Workington	Workington, Cumbria		Methodist / URC
Tintwistle and Glossop URC	Tintwistle, Derbyshire	1670	URC
Tockholes URC	Tockholes, Lancashire		URC
Trinity URC, Blackburn	Blackburn, Lancashire		URC
Trinity Church, Cheadle	Cheadle, Greater Manchester		Methodist / URC
Trinity URC, Lancaster	Lancaster, Lancashire	1773	URC
Trinity Church, Audenshaw	Audenshaw, Greater Manchester		Methodist / URC
Trinity Church Centre, Barrow-in-Furness	Barrow-in-Furness, Cumbria		Methodist / URC
Trinity Community Church, Moss Side	Moss Side, Greater Manchester		Baptist / URC
Trinity Church, Lower Darwen	Lower Darwen, Lancashire		Methodist / URC
Union Street URC, Oldham	Oldham, Greater Manchester	1816	URC
Westbury Gardens URC, Blackburn	Blackburn, Lancashire	1874	URC
Westhoughton URC	Westhoughton, Greater Manchester		URC
Whaley Bridge Uniting Church	Whaley Bridge, Derbyshire		Methodist / URC
Wharton and Cleggs Lane Church	Little Hulton, Greater Manchester		Methodist / URC
Whitehaven URC	Whitehaven, Cumbria	1695	URC
Wilbraham St Ninian's URC	Chorlton-cum-Hardy, Greater Manchester		URC
Wilmslow URC	Wilmslow, Cheshire		URC
Woodlands URC, Blackburn	Blackburn, Lancashire	1885	URC
Worsley Road URC, Swinton	Swinton, Greater Manchester	1862	URC

=== Former URC churches in North Western Synod ===
Church	Location	Founded	Closed	Notes
Abney URC, Mossley	Mossley, Greater Manchester		2017	
Accrington URC	Accrington, Lancashire	1876	2021	
Alexandra URC, Blackpool	Blackpool, Lancashire	pre-1918	2018	
Allithwaite URC	Allithwaite, Cumbria	pre-1920	2002	
Baker Street URC, Stockport	Stockport, Greater Manchester	1893	2003	
Besses o' th' Barn URC	Besses o' th' Barn, Greater Manchester	c. 1863	2024	
Blackford Bridge URC, Bury	Bury, Greater Manchester	1850s	2024	
Bolton Road URC, Darwen	Darwen, Lancashire	1883	2019	
Brampton URC	Brampton, Cumbria	1662	2019	
Burnley and Nelson URC	Burnley, Lancashire	1807	2022	
Castleton URC, Rochdale	Castleton, Greater Manchester	1866	2007	
Chapel Street and Hope URC, Salford	Salford, Greater Manchester	1818	2021	
Chorley Old Road URC, Bolton	Bolton, Greater Manchester	1895	2003	
Christ Church, Reddish	Reddish, Greater Manchester	early 1800s	2021	URC involvement ended, continues as a Methodist church?
Christ Church URC, Broadway	Morecambe, Lancashire	1955	2018	
Church of the Epiphany, Droylsden	Droylsden, Greater Manchester	pre-1990s	2021	URC involvement ended, continues as a CoE/Methodist church
Cleveleys URC	Cleveleys, Lancashire		2021	
Fulwood URC	Fulwood, Lancashire	1866	2022	
Grimshaw Street URC, Preston	Preston, Lancashire	1807	2005	
Halton URC	Halton, Lancashire	1866	2023	
Harrington URC	Harrington, Cumbria	1881	2022	
Haslingden URC	Haslingden, Lancashire	1785	2014	
Heywood URC	Heywood, Greater Manchester	1824	2003	
Jollies Memorial URC, Barrow	Barrow, Lancashire	1662	2015	
Ladybridge Road URC, Cheadle	Cheadle, Greater Manchester	pre-1905	2002	
Lee Lane URC, Horwich	Horwich, Greater Manchester	early C19th	2005	
Leigh URC	Leigh, Greater Manchester		c. 2013	
Lower Chapel URC, Darwen	Darwen, Lancashire	1687	2003	
Lytham URC	Lytham St Annes, Lancashire	1862	2014	
Metropolitan Church Mission Project	Manchester, Greater Manchester	1992	2016	Joined URC 2013. Merged with Wilbraham St Ninian's
Morley Green URC	Morley Green, Cheshire	1869	2010	
Patricroft URC	Patricroft, Greater Manchester	1796	2021	
Penrith and Penruddock URC	Penrith, Cumbria	1654	2022	
Read URC	Read, Lancashire	1885	2018	
Revidge Fold URC	Blackburn, Lancashire	1828	2025	
Sale URC	Sale, Greater Manchester	pre-1968	2022	
Salford Central Mission	Salford, Greater Manchester	1907	c. 2013	
Sedbergh URC	Sedbergh, Cumbria		2018	
Somerset Road URC, Bolton	Bolton, Greater Manchester	1900	2002	
St Andrew's URC, Silloth	Silloth, Cumbria	1886	2023	
St George's, Westhoughton	Westhoughton, Greater Manchester	pre-1996	2017	URC involvement ended, continues as a CoE/Methodist church
St George's URC, Blackpool	Blackpool, Lancashire	1955	2018	
Trinity Church, Cottam Hall	Cottam, Lancashire	2003	2010	URC (and CoE) involvement ended, continues as a Methodist church
Trinity United Church, Cheetham	Cheetham, Greater Manchester		2023	Was an LEP with the CoE church of St Luke's, Cheetham Hill, from the 1980s
Union URC, Stockport	Stockport, Greater Manchester	1873	2019	
Urswick URC	Urswick, Cumbria		2018	
Weaste URC, Salford	Weaste, Greater Manchester	1900	2003	
Wigton URC	Wigton, Cumbria	c. 1666	2009	

== Scotland Synod ==
Church	Location	Founded	Denomination
Annan URC	Annan, Dumfries and Galloway	pre-1903	URC
Augustine United Church	Edinburgh, Edinburgh	1802	URC
Barrhead URC	Barrhead, East Renfrewshire		URC
Evangelical Union URC, Bathgate	Bathgate, West Lothian	1742	URC
Carluke URC	Carluke, South Lanarkshire	1846	URC
Coatbridge URC	Coatbridge, North Lanarkshire		URC
Cumbernauld URC	Cumbernauld, North Lanarkshire		URC
Essenside URC, Drumchapel	Drumchapel, Glasgow	1954	URC
Duke Street URC, Leith	Leith, Edinburgh		URC
Dumbarton URC	Dumbarton, West Dunbartonshire		URC
Dunfermline URC	Dunfermline, Fife	1840	URC
Fraserburgh URC	Fraserburgh, Aberdeenshire	1803	URC
Giffnock URC	Giffnock, East Renfrewshire	1825	URC
Grahamston United Parish Church	Falkirk, Falkirk	pre-1972	CoS / Methodist / URC
Granton United Church	Granton, Edinburgh		Methodist / URC
Greenock East URC	Greenock, Inverclyde		URC
Greenock West URC	Greenock, Inverclyde		URC
Helensburgh URC	Helensburgh, Argyll and Bute		URC
Livingston United Parish Church	Livingston, West Lothian	1966	CoS / Episcopal / Methodist / URC
Montrose URC	Montrose, Angus		URC
Morison Memorial URC, Clydebank	Clydebank, West Dunbartonshire	1893	URC
Morningside United Church	Morningside, Edinburgh		CoS / URC
Nairn URC	Nairn, Highland	1806	URC
Newburgh URC	Newburgh, Fife		URC
Oakshaw Trinity Church	Paisley, Renfrewshire	1754	CoS / URC
Park URC, Airdrie	Airdrie, North Lanarkshire	1845	URC
Peedie Kirk URC, Kirkwall	Kirkwall, Orkney	1806	URC
Port Glasgow URC	Port Glasgow, Inverclyde		URC
Priesthill URC	Priesthill, Glasgow		URC
Righead URC	East Kilbride, South Lanarkshire	1955	URC
Rutherglen URC	Rutherglen, South Lanarkshire	1901	URC
Saughtonhall URC	Edinburgh, Edinburgh	1929	URC
Shawlands URC	Shawlands, Glasgow		URC
St Ninian's Church, Stonehouse	Stonehouse, South Lanarkshire		CoS / URC
Stewarton URC	Stewarton, East Ayrshire		URC
Thurso URC	Thurso, Highland		URC
Wishaw URC	Wishaw, North Lanarkshire		URC

=== Former URC churches in Scotland Synod ===
Church	Location	Founded	Closed	Notes
Avonbridge URC	Avonbridge, Falkirk	1844	2020	
Beith URC	Beith, North Ayrshire		2019	
Coaltown of Balgonie URC	Coaltown of Balgonie, Fife	1894	2021	
Dalry URC	Dalry, Edinburgh	1872	2006	
Dumfries URC	Dumfries, Dumfries and Galloway	1805	c. 2013	
East Mains URC	East Kilbride, South Lanarkshire	1954	2022	
Galashiels URC	Galashiels, Scottish Borders	1844	2012	
Hamilton URC	Hamilton, South Lanarkshire	1807	2025	
Kirk of St Nicholas Uniting, Aberdeen	Aberdeen, Aberdeenshire	C12th	2020	CoS / URC
Mosspark United Church	Mosspark, Glasgow	1929	2019	Methodist / URC
Pleasance Gardens URC, Falkirk	Falkirk, Falkirk	1875	2008	
Pollokshields URC	Pollokshields, Glasgow	1899	2013	
Portobello URC	Portobello, Edinburgh	1836	2016	
Salem Chapel URC, Dundee	Dundee, Dundee	1839	2019	
Selkirk URC	Selkirk, Scottish Borders	1842	2017	
St Serf's Community Church, Dunning	Dunning, Perth and Kinross		2021	

== South Western Synod ==
Church	Location	Founded	Denomination
Argyle Morley URC	Speedwell, Bristol		URC
Axminster URC	Axminster, Devon		URC
Bere Alston United Church	Bere Alston, Devon	1811	Methodist / URC
Bickington URC	Bickington, Devon		URC
Lavington URC, Bideford	Bideford, Devon	c. 1660	URC
Boulevard URC, Weston-super-Mare	Weston-super-Mare, Somerset		URC
Brislington URC	Brislington, Bristol	1796	URC
Brixham URC	Brixham, Devon		URC
Cannington URC	Cannington, Somerset		URC
Central Church, Torquay	Torquay, Devon	1788	Methodist / URC
Central URC, Bath	Bath, Somerset		URC
Central Church Swindon	Swindon, Wiltshire		Baptist / Methodist / URC
Christ Church, Barnstaple	Barnstaple, Devon	c. 1660	Methodist / URC
Christ Church, Braunton	Braunton, Devon		Methodist / URC
Cricklade United Church	Cricklade, Wiltshire		Methodist / URC
Curry Rivel URC	Curry Rivel, Somerset	1840	URC
Derriford Church	Derriford, Devon	1895	URC
St Andrew's, Devizes	Devizes, Wiltshire	c. 1672	Methodist / URC
Elmore URC	Tiverton, Devon		URC
Emmanuel URC, Haydon Wick	Haydon Wick, Wiltshire		URC
Fairplace United Church, Okehampton	Okehampton, Devon	1842	Methodist / URC
Flavel Church, Dartmouth	Dartmouth, Devon		Methodist / URC
Zion United Church, Frampton Cotterell	Frampton Cotterell, Gloucestershire	1795	Methodist / URC
Furrough Cross URC	Babbacombe, Devon	1850	URC
Glastonbury URC	Glastonbury, Somerset	1662	URC
Glenorchy URC, Exmouth	Exmouth, Devon	1777	URC
Heavitree URC	Heavitree, Devon		URC
Highworth URC	Highworth, Wiltshire	1777	URC
Holt URC	Holt, Wiltshire	pre-1880	URC
Holy Trinity, Shaw	Swindon, Wiltshire		CoE / Baptist / Methodist / URC
Whitefield Memorial Tabernacle, Horfield	Horfield, Bristol	1930	URC
Immanuel URC, Swindon	Swindon, Wiltshire	1804	URC
Kingsteignton Chapel URC	Kingsteignton, Devon		URC
Larkhall URC	Larkhall, Somerset		URC
Locking Castle Church, Weston-super-Mare	Weston-super-Mare, Somerset	1992	CoE / Baptist / Methodist / URC
Lynch Chapel, Winscombe	Winscombe, Somerset		URC
Lynton URC	Lynton, Devon		URC
Malmesbury URC	Malmesbury, Wiltshire		URC
Mangotsfield and Castle Green URC	Mangotsfield, Gloucestershire		URC
Martock URC	Martock, Somerset		URC
Melksham United Church	Melksham, Wiltshire	pre-1872	Methodist / URC
Middle Lambrook URC	Kingsbury Episcopi, Somerset		URC
Minehead URC	Minehead, Somerset	1905	URC
Monk's Chapel, Corsham	Corsham, Wiltshire	1690	URC
Muddiford URC	Marwood, Devon		URC
Nailsea URC	Nailsea, Somerset	1662	URC
The Avenue Church, Newton Abbot	Newton Abbot, Devon		Methodist / URC
Oldland Common Tabernacle	Oldland Common, Gloucestershire		URC
Ottery St Mary URC	Ottery St Mary, Devon	1662	URC
Pilgrim Church Plymouth	Milehouse, Devon		URC
Pinhoe URC	Pinhoe, Devon		URC
Plymstock United Church	Plymstock, Devon	1927	URC
Plymtree URC	Plymtree, Devon		URC
Portishead URC	Portishead, Somerset	1840	URC
Portscatho United Church	Portscatho, Cornwall	c. 1820	Methodist / URC
Primley URC, Sidmouth	Sidmouth, Devon		URC
Redland Park Church	Redland, Bristol	1861	URC
Wootton Bassett URC	Royal Wootton Bassett, Wiltshire	1825	URC
Rush Hill URC, Bath	Bath, Somerset		URC
Seaton URC	Seaton, Devon	1826	URC
Sherwell United Church	North Hill, Devon		Methodist / URC
Southernhay URC, Exeter	Exeter, Devon		URC
Southmead New Brunswick URC	Southmead, Bristol		URC
St Aldhelm's, Corsham	Corsham, Wiltshire	1790	Methodist / URC
St Andrew's, Mevagissey	Mevagissey, Cornwall		Methodist / URC
St Martin's URC, Bude	Bude, Cornwall		URC
St Mary's, Lydiard Tregoze	Lydiard Tregoze, Wiltshire	Medieval	CoE / Baptist / Methodist / URC
Street URC	Street, Somerset	1798	URC
Tabernacle URC, Hanham	Hanham, Gloucestershire		URC
Taunton URC	Taunton, Somerset	1662	URC
Tavistock URC	Tavistock, Devon	c. 1652	URC
Templecombe URC	Templecombe, Somerset		URC
The Strand Church, Dawlish	Dawlish, Devon		URC
Thornbury URC	Thornbury, Gloucestershire	1662	URC
Tiverton United Church	Tiverton, Devon		Methodist / URC
Toothill Church	Swindon, Wiltshire		CoE / Baptist / Methodist / URC
Cornerstone Church, Torpoint	Torpoint, Cornwall		Methodist / URC
Trinity URC, Market Lavington	Market Lavington, Wiltshire	1892	URC
Trinity URC, Henleaze	Henleaze, Bristol		URC
United Church, Trowbridge	Trowbridge, Wiltshire	1771	Methodist / URC
United Church, Warminster	Warminster, Wiltshire	1566	Methodist / URC
United Church, Bradford-on-Avon	Bradford-on-Avon, Wiltshire		Methodist / URC
Wellington URC	Wellington, Somerset		URC
Wells United Church	Wells, Somerset	c. 1750	Baptist / URC
West Street Church, Somerton	Somerton, Somerset	c. 1653	Methodist / URC
Westbury URC	Westbury, Wiltshire	1662	URC
Westfield URC, Bridgwater	Bridgwater, Somerset		URC

=== Former URC churches in South Western Synod ===
Church	Location	Founded	Closed	Notes
Avebury URC	Avebury, Wiltshire	1670	2014	
Aylesbeare URC	Aylesbeare, Devon	1870	2011	
Bedminster URC	Bedminster, Bristol	c. 1860	2024	
Bickington URC	Bickington, Devon	1835	2018	
Bishops Lydeard URC	Bishops Lydeard, Somerset	1857	2007	
Bishopsworth URC	Bishopsworth, Bristol	1828	2012	
Holy Trinity, Bradley Stoke	Bradley Stoke, Gloucestershire		2017	URC involvement ended, continues as a CoE/Methodist church
Christ Church URC, Charmouth	Charmouth, Dorset	1662	2016	
Christ Church, Estover	Estover, Devon	1980	2021	Baptist/Methodist/URC involvement ended, continues as a CoE church
Christ Church, Marlborough	Marlborough, Wiltshire	1817	2011	URC involvement ended, continues as a Methodist church
Christ the Servant, Abbey Meads	Swindon, Wiltshire	1996	2023	Baptist / Methodist / URC
Clevedon URC	Clevedon, Somerset	1812	2006	
Dartmouth Road URC, Paignton	Paignton, Devon	1817	2006	
Emmanuel, Ilfracombe	Ilfracombe, Devon	c. 1687	2023	Methodist / URC
Falmouth URC	Falmouth, Cornwall	c. 1662	2019	
Felton Chapel, Bristol	Bristol, Bristol		c. 2009	
Foxhole URC, Paignton	Paignton, Devon	1954	2004	
Henbury New Kingsland URC	Henbury, Bristol	1954	2019	
Kingskerswell URC	Kingskerswell, Devon	1854	2020	
Kingswood United Church	Kingswood, Gloucestershire	1739	2023	Moravian / URC
Laira URC	Laira, Devon	1850	2010	
Lakeway United Church, North Tawton	North Tawton, Devon	early C19th	2021	Methodist / URC
Langport URC	Langport, Somerset	1828	2021	
Lawrence Hill Church	Lawrence Hill, Bristol	1968	2013	Methodist / URC
Morcombelake URC	Morcombelake, Dorset	1832	2014	
Newquay URC	Newquay, Cornwall	1880	2018	Left over doctrinal drift; now Newquay Evangelical Church
Penhill URC, Swindon	Swindon, Wiltshire	1950s	2014	
North Petherton URC	North Petherton, Somerset	1833	2007	
Sidmouth URC	Sidmouth, Devon	c. 1650	2017	
Stoke-sub-Hamdon URC	Stoke-sub-Hamdon, Somerset	c. 1689	2017	
St Thomas' URC, Exeter	Exeter, Devon	1901	2004	
Tabernacle URC, Chippenham	Chippenham, Wiltshire	1770	2016	
Teignmouth URC	Teignmouth, Devon	1790	2024	Became Lighthouse Pioneer Church
Trinity URC, Plymouth	Hartley, Devon	1853	2023	
Uffculme URC	Uffculme, Devon		2021	
Upton Cheyney URC	Upton Cheyney, Gloucestershire	c. 1740	2023	
Westlea Church	Swindon, Wiltshire		2024	CoE / Baptist / Methodist / URC
Yeovil URC	Yeovil, Somerset	1662	2018	

== Southern Synod ==
Website

Church	Location	Founded	Denomination
All Saints URC, Burgess Hill	Burgess Hill, West Sussex		URC
St Andrew's URC, Balham	Balham, London		URC
St Mark's URC, Balham	Balham, London		URC
Banstead URC	Banstead, Surrey	1940	URC
St Andrew's URC, Battersea and Clapham	Battersea, London	1645	URC
Bexhill URC	Bexhill-on-Sea, East Sussex		URC
Bexley URC	Bexley, London		URC
Brighthelm URC, Brighton	Brighton, East Sussex	1662	URC
Brixton Hill URC	Brixton, London		URC
Broadway United Church, Eastbourne	Eastbourne, East Sussex		Methodist / URC
St Andrew's URC, Brockley	Brockley, London		URC
Bromley URC	Bromley, London	1788	URC
Broomfield URC, Herne Bay	Herne Bay, Kent		URC
Camberwell Green URC	Camberwell, London		URC
Caterham URC	Caterham, Surrey	1863	URC
Trinity URC, Catford	Catford, London		URC
Central URC, Hove	Hove, East Sussex		URC
Charlton URC	Charlton, London		URC
Christ Church URC, Leatherhead	Leatherhead, Surrey	1829	URC
Christ Church, East Dulwich	East Dulwich, London		Methodist / URC
Christ Church URC, Petts Wood	Petts Wood, London	1939	URC
Christ Church URC, Swanley	Swanley, Kent		URC
Christ Church URC, Westgate-on-Sea	Westgate-on-Sea, Kent	1884	URC
Christ Church, Lewes	Lewes, East Sussex	1816	Methodist / URC
Christ Church, Chichester	Chichester, West Sussex		Methodist / URC
Christ Church URC, Sevenoaks	Sevenoaks, Kent		URC
Christ Church URC, Tonbridge	Tonbridge, Kent	1751	URC
Christ Church URC, Bellingham	Bellingham, London	1923	URC
Clive Vale URC, Hastings	Hastings, East Sussex		URC
Cobham United Church	Cobham, Surrey	1962	Methodist / URC
Copleston Centre Church, Peckham	Peckham, London		CoE / URC
Crawley URC	Crawley, West Sussex	pre-1950	URC
Cross Way Church, Seaford	Seaford, East Sussex	1877	Methodist / URC
Crossway URC, Southwark	Southwark, London	pre-1864	URC
Crowborough United Church	Crowborough, East Sussex	pre-1967	Methodist / URC
Cuxton Community Church	Cuxton, Kent	1894	URC
Dorking URC	Dorking, Surrey	1662	URC
Dulwich Grove URC	East Dulwich, London	1875	URC
East Croydon URC	Croydon, London		URC
East Wittering URC	East Wittering, West Sussex		URC
Eastwick Road URC, Bookham	Great Bookham, Surrey		URC
Elmers End Free Church	Elmers End, London		URC
Emmanuel, Sidcup	Sidcup, London	1879	Methodist / URC
Emmanuel URC, West Wickham	West Wickham, London	1888	URC
Emmanuel URC, Worthing	Worthing, West Sussex		URC
Emmanuel, Eastbourne	Eastbourne, East Sussex		Methodist / URC
Epsom URC	Epsom, Surrey	1689	URC
Ewell URC	Ewell, Surrey		URC
Faversham United Church	Faversham, Kent		Methodist / URC
Five Oak Green Church	Five Oak Green, Kent		CoE / URC
Geddes Place URC, Bexleyheath	Bexleyheath, London		URC
Giggs Hill Church	St Paul's Cray, London	c. 1958	URC
Gillingham URC	Gillingham, Kent		URC
Goring URC	Goring-by-Sea, West Sussex	1940	URC
St Mark's United Church, Greenwich	Greenwich, London		Methodist / URC
Hampton Hill URC	Hampton Hill, London	1870	URC
Hardres Street United Church, Ramsgate	Ramsgate, Kent		Methodist / URC
Hassocks URC	Hassocks, West Sussex	1886	URC
Hawkenbury URC, Tunbridge Wells	Hawkenbury, Kent		URC
Hayes Free Church	Hayes, London		URC
Haywards Heath URC	Haywards Heath, West Sussex		URC
Herne Hill United Church	Herne Hill, London		Methodist / URC
Horsham with Slinfold URC	Horsham, West Sussex		URC
Hounsom Memorial URC, Hove	Hove, East Sussex	1938	URC
Hythe URC	Hythe, Kent		URC
Kennington United Church, Ashford	Kennington, Kent	1863	Methodist / URC
Kingston URC	Kingston-upon-Thames, London		URC
Lee Green URC	Lee, London		URC
Lewes Road URC, Brighton	Brighton, East Sussex		URC
Lindfield URC	Lindfield, West Sussex		URC
Littlehampton United Church	Littlehampton, West Sussex		Methodist / URC
Maidstone URC	Maidstone, Kent		URC
Moat URC, East Grinstead	East Grinstead, West Sussex		URC
St Michael's United Church, New Cross	New Cross, London		CoE / URC
New Malden URC	New Malden, London	1881	URC
Peace of God URC, Oxted	Oxted, Surrey	1902	URC
Pagham URC	Pagham, West Sussex	1813	URC
Polegate Free Church	Polegate, East Sussex	1875	URC
Portslade URC	Portslade, East Sussex	1875	URC
Pulborough URC	Pulborough, West Sussex	1845	URC
Purley URC	Purley, London	1895	URC
Raleigh Road United Church, Richmond	Richmond-upon-Thames, London	1773	Methodist / URC
Redhill URC	Redhill, Surrey		URC
Reigate Park Church	Reigate, Surrey	1662	URC
Rusthall URC	Rusthall, Kent		URC
St Martin's URC, Saltdean	Saltdean, East Sussex	1949	URC
Sanderstead URC	Sanderstead, London	1931	URC
Sandwich URC	Sandwich, Kent	c. 1640	URC
Sedlescombe URC	Sedlescombe, East Sussex		URC
Sompting URC	Sompting, West Sussex		URC
South Croydon United Church	South Croydon, London		Methodist / URC
St Andrew's URC, Cheam	Cheam, London	c. 1925	URC
St Andrew's URC, Dartford	Dartford, Kent	1910	URC
St Andrew's URC, Rustington	Rustington, West Sussex	1960s	URC
St Andrew's URC, Canterbury	Canterbury, Kent		URC
St Barnabas United Church, Eastbourne	Eastbourne, East Sussex		Methodist / URC
St John's URC, Orpington	Orpington, London		URC
St Johns Hill URC, Sevenoaks	Sevenoaks, Kent		URC
St John's URC, Marsh Green	Marsh Green, Kent	1882	URC
St Luke's URC, Silverhill	Silverhill, East Sussex	1853	URC
St Paul's URC, South Croydon	South Croydon, London	1901	URC
St Paul's URC, Gravesend	Gravesend, Kent		URC
Staplehurst URC	Staplehurst, Kent		URC
Stockwell Green URC	Stockwell, London	c. 1830	URC
Streatham URC	Streatham, London		URC
Grove Centre Church, Sydenham	Sydenham, London		Baptist / URC
Telscombe Cliffs Community Church	Telscombe, East Sussex	1931	URC
Temple URC, St Mary Cray	St Mary Cray, London	1851	URC
Church of the Cross, Thamesmead	Thamesmead, London	1970s	CoE / Methodist / URC
St Paul's, Thamesmead	Thamesmead, London	1977	CoE / Methodist / URC
The Bay URC, Birchington	Birchington-on-Sea, Kent		URC
The Beacon Church, Dover	Dover, Kent		Methodist / URC
The Church in Hope Street, Sheerness	Sheerness, Kent	c. 1845	Methodist / URC
Emmaus Christian Centre, Chatham	Chatham, Kent		URC
Herne Bay United Church	Herne Bay, Kent		Methodist / URC
The Vale URC, Broadstairs	Broadstairs, Kent		URC
The Vines URC, Rochester	Rochester, Kent		URC
Tolworth URC	Tolworth, London	1933	URC
Tooting URC	Tooting, London	1688	URC
Trinity Church, Sutton	Sutton, London	1907	Methodist / URC
Trinity Church, Deal	Deal, Kent	pre-1900	Methodist / URC
Trinity URC, Billingshurst	Billingshurst, West Sussex		URC
Trinity Church, Willingdon	Willingdon, East Sussex		Baptist / Methodist / URC
Twickenham URC	Twickenham, London	c. 1835	URC
Cornerstone Church, Uckfield	Uckfield, East Sussex		Methodist / URC
Union Church, Margate	Margate, Kent	1860	Methodist / URC
United Church Cade Road, Ashford	Ashford, Kent	1662	Methodist / URC
Emmanuel United Church, Tunbridge Wells	Tunbridge Wells, Kent		Methodist / URC
Wallington URC	Wallington, London	1881	URC
East Hill URC, Wandsworth	Wandsworth, London	1811	URC
West Thamesmead Community Church	Thamesmead, London	2016	CoE / Methodist / URC
Whitstable URC	Whitstable, Kent	1808	URC
Trinity URC, Wimbledon	Wimbledon, London	1883	URC

=== Former URC churches in Southern Synod ===
Church	Location	Founded	Closed	Notes
Alfriston URC	Alfriston, East Sussex	1801	2009	
Ash URC	Ash, Kent	c. 1807	2015	
Ashburnham URC	Ashburnham, East Sussex		2013	Became an independent chapel
Balcombe URC	Balcombe, West Sussex	1850s	2012	
Beckenham URC	Beckenham, London	pre-1875	2022	
Bosham URC	Bosham, West Sussex	1812	2005	
Christ Church URC, Walton-on-the-Hill	Walton-on-the-Hill, Surrey	1885	2022	
Clapham URC	Clapham, London		2002	
Earlsfield URC	Earlsfield, London		2003	
East Sheen URC	East Sheen, London	1662	2006	
Eltham URC	Eltham, London	1846	2024	
Folkestone URC	Folkestone, Kent		2016	
Gomshall URC	Gomshall, Surrey		2020	
Hartley URC	Hartley, Kent	1927	2016	
High Street URC, Lewisham	Lewisham, London	1797	2024	
Lenham URC	Lenham, Kent	1662	2012	
Northfleet URC	Northfleet, Kent	1850	2017	
Petworth URC	Petworth, West Sussex	1855	2024	
Pratts Bottom URC	Pratt's Bottom, London	1885	2013	
Richmond Green URC	Richmond, London	1876	2015	
Robertsbridge URC	Robertsbridge, East Sussex	1881	2015	Now affiliated with the Baptist Union
Robertson Street URC, Hastings	Hastings, East Sussex	1856	2012	
Sittingbourne and Milton Regis URC	Sittingbourne, Kent	1835	2015	
South Norwood URC	South Norwood, London	1870	2015	
Southfleet URC	Southfleet, Kent	1840	2005	
Speer Road URC, Thames Ditton	Thames Ditton, Surrey	1804	2021	
St John's, Great Chart	Great Chart, Kent	1812	2007	Methodist / URC. Joined URC 2003
St John's, Grove Green	Grove Green, Kent		c. 2011	United church
St Mark's URC, Hastings	Hastings, East Sussex	1879	2020	
St Mary's Island Church, Chatham	Chatham, Kent	1999	2012	URC involvement ended, continues as a CoE church
Trinity URC, Bromley	Bromley, London	1895	2022	
Trinity URC, Ifield	Ifield, West Sussex	1856	2010	
Welling URC	Welling, London	1825	2009	
West Langdon URC	West Langdon, Kent	1863	2019	
Whitfield URC, Dover	Whitfield, Kent	c. 1750	2018	

== Thames North Synod ==
Church	Location	Founded	Denomination
Acton Hill Church	Acton, London	1817	Methodist / URC
Adeyfield Free Church	Hemel Hempstead, Hertfordshire	1953	URC
American International Church	Fitzrovia, London	1969	URC
Amersham Free Church	Amersham, Buckinghamshire	1907	Baptist / URC
Ashwell URC	Ashwell, Hertfordshire	1852	URC
Askew Road Church, Shepherd's Bush	Shepherd's Bush, London	1857	Methodist / URC
Baldock URC	Baldock, Hertfordshire	1826	URC
Barking URC	Barking, London	1782	URC
Wood Street URC, Barnet	Barnet, London	1669	URC
St Paul's URC, Bayswater	Bayswater, London	1861	URC
Beaconsfield URC	Beaconsfield, Buckinghamshire	1704	URC
Bethnal Green Meeting House	Bethnal Green, London	1662	URC
Brentford Free Church	Brentford, London	1694	Baptist / URC
Bromley-by-Bow URC	Bromley-by-Bow, London	1868	URC
Brookmans Park URC	Brookmans Park, Hertfordshire	1943	URC
Broxbourne URC	Broxbourne, Hertfordshire	1781	URC
Burnham URC	Burnham, Buckinghamshire	1790	URC
Bush Hill Park URC	Bush Hill Park, London	1889	URC
Chadwell Heath URC	Chadwell Heath, London	1885	URC
Chelsea Community Baptist Church	Chelsea, London	1865	Baptist / URC
Cheshunt Free Church	Cheshunt, Hertfordshire	1782	URC
St Andrew's Chesterfield Road URC, Barnet	Barnet, London	1935	URC
Chingford URC	Chingford, London	1888	URC
Greenwood URC, St Albans	Chiswell Green, Hertfordshire	1965	URC
Christ Church, Uxbridge	Uxbridge, London	1662	Methodist / URC
Christ Church URC, Hatfield	Hatfield, Hertfordshire	1823	URC
Christ Church URC, Enfield	Enfield, London	1778	URC
Christ Church, Hitchin	Hitchin, Hertfordshire	1969	Methodist / URC
The Church on Fairford Leys	Fairford Leys, Buckinghamshire	2000	CoE / Catholic / Methodist / URC
City Temple	City of London	1640	URC
Clapton Park and Dalston URC	Clapton, London	1804	URC
Cores End URC	Cores End, Buckinghamshire	1768	URC
Crouch End Union Church	Crouch End, London	1855	Baptist / URC
Deanway United Church	Chalfont St Giles, Buckinghamshire	1662	Methodist / URC
Ealing Green Church	Ealing, London	1800	Methodist / URC
St Andrew's URC, Ealing	Ealing, London	1874	URC
Edmonton URC	Edmonton, London	1789	URC
St Margaret's URC, Finchley	Finchley, London	1893	URC
St Andrew's URC, Frognal	Frognal, London	1900	URC
Fulham URC	Fulham, London	pre-1904	URC
Gants Hill URC	Gants Hill, London	1964	URC
Trinity Church, Golders Green	Golders Green, London	1911	Methodist / URC
Hampstead Garden Suburb Free Church	Hampstead Garden Suburb, London	1910	Baptist / URC
St Margaret's & St George's, Harlesden	Harlesden, London	1874	URC / Moravian
Harpenden URC	Harpenden, Hertfordshire	1822	URC
Hertford URC	Hertford, Hertfordshire	1673	URC
Heston Asian URC	Heston, London	2012	URC
High Cross URC, Tottenham	Tottenham, London	1866	URC
Highgate URC	Highgate, London	1662	URC
Holy Trinity URC, Perivale	Perivale, London	1936	URC
Homewood Road URC, St Albans	St Albans, Hertfordshire	1941	URC
Hounslow URC	Hounslow, London	1824	URC
Howard Memorial Church, Cardington	Cardington, Bedfordshire	1839	Methodist / URC
Ickenham URC	Ickenham, London	1831	URC
Islington URC	Islington, London		URC
Kensington URC	Kensington, London	1793	URC
Kingsway URC, Slough	Slough, Berkshire	1835	URC
Lancaster Road URC, Enfield	Enfield, London	1885	URC
Letchworth Free Church	Letchworth, Hertfordshire	1924	URC
Grange Park URC, Leyton	Leyton, London	1873	URC
Leytonstone United Free Church	Leytonstone, London	1827	Baptist / URC
Mill Hill East Church	Mill Hill, London	1950	Baptist / URC
Muswell Hill URC	Muswell Hill, London	1899	URC
Nelmes URC, Hornchurch	Hornchurch, London	1906	URC
Christ Church, New Southgate & Friern Barnet	New Southgate, London	1884	Baptist / URC
Christ Church URC, Newham	Newham, London	1807	URC
Newland Church, Luton	Luton, Bedfordshire	1864	Methodist / URC
Newland Church, Dunstable	Dunstable, Bedfordshire	1965	Methodist / URC
Palmers Green URC	Palmers Green, London	1907	URC
Panshanger Church	Welwyn Garden City, Hertfordshire	1971	CoE / Baptist / Methodist / URC
Ponders End URC	Ponders End, London	1745	URC
Potters Bar URC	Potters Bar, Hertfordshire	1934	URC
Radlett United Free Church	Radlett, Hertfordshire	1905	Methodist / URC
Rectory Road URC, Hackney	Hackney, London	1871	URC
Seven Kings United Free Church	Seven Kings, London	1982?	Baptist / URC
St Andrew's URC, Gerrards Cross	Gerrards Cross, Buckinghamshire	1919	URC
St Andrew's URC, Borehamwood	Borehamwood, Hertfordshire	1958	URC
St George's URC, Hemel Hempstead	Hemel Hempstead, Hertfordshire	1954	URC
St James' URC, Buckhurst Hill	Buckhurst Hill, Essex	1860	URC
St John's URC, New Barnet	New Barnet, London	1870	URC
St John's URC, Northwood	Northwood, London	1905	URC
St Thomas' URC, Watford	Watford, Hertfordshire		URC
Stamford Hill URC	Stamford Hill, London	1872	URC
Stepney Meeting House	Stepney, London	1644	URC
Stevenage URC	Stevenage, Hertfordshire	1952	URC
Chesham URC	Chesham, Buckinghamshire	1724	URC
Eastcote and Northwood Hills URC	Northwood, London	1939	URC
Union Church Totteridge	Totteridge, London	1945	URC
Trinity Church, Harrow	Harrow, London	1975	Methodist / URC
Trinity URC, High Wycombe	High Wycombe, Buckinghamshire	1662	URC
Trinity URC, Slough	Slough, Berkshire	1941	URC
Trinity Church, Enfield	Enfield, London	1890	Methodist / URC
Trinity URC, Upminster	Upminster, London	1801	URC
Trinity Church, Knebworth	Knebworth, Hertfordshire	1887	Methodist / URC
Trinity Church, Mill Hill	Mill Hill, London	1886	Methodist / URC
Trinity Church, North Finchley	North Finchley, London	1864	Baptist / URC
Upper Clapton URC	Upper Clapton, London	1812	URC
Vine URC, Ilford	Ilford, London	1892	URC
Walkern and Sandon URC	Walkern, Hertfordshire	1662	URC
Trinity URC, Walthamstow	Walthamstow, London	1870	URC
Walthamstow UR Asian Christian Church	Walthamstow, London	1999	URC
Wanstead URC	Wanstead, London	1865	URC
Welwyn Garden City URC	Welwyn Garden City, Hertfordshire	1921	URC
Wembley Park URC	Wembley Park, London	1930	URC
Wendover Free Church	Wendover, Buckinghamshire	1811	Baptist / URC
Western Road URC, Romford	Romford, London	1662	URC
Wheathampstead United Church	Wheathampstead, Hertfordshire	1812	Methodist / URC. Closed?
Winchmore Hill URC	Winchmore Hill, London	1742	URC
Woodford Bridge URC	Woodford Bridge, London	1890	URC

=== Former URC churches in Thames North Synod ===
Church	Location	Founded	Closed	Notes
Bricket Wood URC	Bricket Wood, Hertfordshire	1895	2019	
Broadway URC, Hammersmith	Hammersmith, London	1640s	2005	
Bury Park URC, Luton	Luton, Bedfordshire	1895	2023	
Bushey URC	Bushey, Hertfordshire	1809	2010	
Chigwell Row URC	Chigwell Row, Essex		2016	
Christ Church at Whetstone URC	Oakleigh Park, London	1788	2020	
Cockfosters URC	Cockfosters, London	1939	2003	
Colnbrook and Poyle United Church	Colnbrook with Poyle, Berkshire	1814	2021	Methodist / URC
Edward Street URC, Dunstable	Dunstable, Bedfordshire	1852	2023	URC
Feltham United Free Church	Feltham, London	1909	2018	Methodist / URC
Heaton Way URC, Harold Hill	Harold Hill, London	1960	2023	
Holtspur URC	Beaconsfield, Buckinghamshire	1946	2021	Became an independent church from Beaconsfield URC in 1995
Lumen (Regent Square) URC, Bloomsbury	Bloomsbury, London	1808	2020	
Manor Road URC, Stoke Newington	Stoke Newington, London	1873	2023	
Paddington Chapel URC	Paddington, London	1813	2003	
Queens Park URC	Queen's Park, London		2016	
Slough UR Asian Christian Church	Slough, Berkshire	mid-1990s	2011	Joined URC 2000
St Andrew's URC, Iver	Iver, Buckinghamshire	1928	2019	
St Andrew's URC, West Kilburn	Kilburn, London	1896	2020	
St John's URC, Kenton	Kenton, London	1930	2013	
St Luke's United Church, Bedford	Bedford, Bedfordshire	1745	2008	URC / Moravian
St Mark's URC, Aylesbury	Aylesbury, Buckinghamshire	1950	2014	
St Ninian's URC, Luton	Luton, Bedfordshire	1941	2023	
The Hyde URC	Colindale, London	1873	2023	
Trinity URC, Camden Town	Camden Town, London	1869	2023	
Trinity URC, St Albans	St Albans, Hertfordshire	1903	2023	
Wingrave URC	Wingrave, Buckinghamshire	C17th	2003	
Woodford Green URC	Woodford Green, London	1888	2022	
Woodhall Farm URC, Hemel Hempstead	Hemel Hempstead, Hertfordshire	1975	2002	

== Wales Synod ==
Church	Location	Founded	Denomination
Castle Street URC, Abergavenny	Abergavenny, Monmouthshire		URC
Albany Church, Haverfordwest	Haverfordwest, Pembrokeshire		Methodist / URC
Bailey Street Uniting Church, Brynmawr	Brynmawr, Blaenau Gwent		URC
Barry Uniting Church	Barry, Vale of Glamorgan		Methodist / URC
Bethany URC, Ystrad Mynach	Ystrad Mynach, Caerphilly		URC
Bethel URC, Llanishen	Llanishen, Cardiff		URC
Bethel URC, Wolfsdale	Camrose, Pembrokeshire	1827	URC
Bethesda'r Fro URC, St Athan	St Athan, Vale of Glamorgan		URC
Beulah URC, Rhiwbina	Rhiwbina, Cardiff	1849	URC
Bridgend United Church	Bridgend, Bridgend		Methodist / URC
Bryn Zion and Beiliheulog URC	Erwood, Powys		URC
Canton Uniting Church	Canton, Cardiff	1640	Baptist (GB) / URC
Christ Church, Milford Haven	Milford Haven, Pembrokeshire		Methodist / URC
Christ Well URC, Manselton	Manselton, Swansea		URC
Christ Church, Ogmore Vale	Ogmore Vale, Bridgend		Methodist / URC
City URC, Cardiff	Cardiff, Cardiff		URC
Crane Street Church, Pontypool	Pontypool, Torfaen	c. 1820	Baptist (GB) / URC
Cwmbran URC	Cwmbran, Torfaen		URC
Dan y Graig Church, Risca	Risca, Caerphilly		Methodist / Presbyterian / URC
Ebenezer URC, Pontnewynydd	Pontnewynydd, Torfaen	1742	URC
Ebenezer URC, Brecon	Brecon, Powys		URC
Edwardsville URC	Treharris, Merthyr Tydfil		URC
Elfed Avenue United Church	Penarth, Vale of Glamorgan		Presbyterian / URC
Gilwern URC	Gilwern, Monmouthshire		URC
Gloddaeth United Church	Llandudno, Conwy		Presbyterian / URC
Hall Street Church, Llanelli	Llanelli, Carmarthenshire		Methodist / URC
Hanover URC, Llanover	Llanover, Monmouthshire	1644	URC
Hill URC, Mount Pleasant	Mount Pleasant, Swansea		URC
Hope & Market Square United Church, Merthyr Tydfil	Merthyr Tydfil, Merthyr Tydfil		Presbyterian / URC
Horeb URC, Builth Wells	Builth Wells, Powys		URC
Horeb URC, Dyserth	Dyserth, Denbighshire	1906	URC
Keyston URC	Camrose, Pembrokeshire	1787	URC
Libanus URC, Brecon	Brecon, Powys		URC
Llanfair Uniting Church	Penrhys, Rhondda Cynon Taf	1971	Multidenomational^{1}
Maesyronnen with Glasbury URC	Glasbury, Powys		URC
Tyddyn Street United Church, Mold	Mold, Flintshire	1857	Presbyterian / URC
Mount Zion Church, Hook	Hook, Pembrokeshire		URC / Congregational
Nolton Haven URC	Nolton Haven, Pembrokeshire	1858	URC
Parkminster URC	Roath, Cardiff		URC
Plough Church, Brecon	Brecon, Powys		URC / Independents
Pontprennau Community Church	Pontprennau, Cardiff	2003	CiW / Baptist (GB) / Methodist / URC
Reynalton URC	Reynalton, Pembrokeshire		URC
Rhos-on-Sea URC	Rhos-on-Sea, Conwy		URC
Rivertown URC	Shotton, Flintshire		URC
Salisbury Park URC, Wrexham	Wrexham, Wrexham		URC
Sardis URC, Llangynidr	Llangynidr, Powys		URC
Sardis Community Chapel, Ynysddu	Ynysddu, Caerphilly		Presbyterian / URC
Sarnau URC, Llanymynech	Llanymynech, Powys		URC
Senghenydd and Abertridwr URC	Senghenydd, Caerphilly		URC
St Andrew's URC, Cardiff	Roath, Cardiff	1897	URC
St David's, Aberystwyth	Aberystwyth, Ceredigion		Presbyterian / URC
St David's Uniting Church, Pontypridd	Pontypridd, Rhondda Cynon Taf	1810	Baptist (GB) / Presbyterian / URC
St John's URC, Buckley	Buckley, Flintshire		URC
St John's, Tenby	Tenby, Pembrokeshire	c. 1800	Methodist / URC
St John's URC, Flint with Bagillt	Flint, Flintshire		URC
St Paul's United Church, Penmaenmawr	Penmaenmawr, Conwy	1880s	Methodist / URC
Stow Park Church	Newport, Newport		Presbyterian / URC
Tabernacle URC, Holywell	Holywell, Flintshire		URC
Tabernacle URC, Llanvaches	Llanvaches, Newport		URC
Tabernacle URC, Mumbles	Mumbles, Swansea		URC
Tabernacle URC, Pembroke	Pembroke, Pembrokeshire		URC
Tabernacle URC, Rhayader	Rhayader, Powys		URC
Tabernacle URC, Pennorth	Llanhamlach, Powys		URC
Temple URC, Gowerton	Gowerton, Swansea		URC
Templeton URC	Templeton, Pembrokeshire		URC
The United Church in Rhyl	Rhyl, Denbighshire		Presbyterian / URC
Tabernacle URC, Tiers Cross	Tiers Cross, Pembrokeshire	1814	URC
Trinity Church, Llanidloes	Llanidloes, Powys		Presbyterian / URC
Trinity Church, Porthcawl	Porthcawl, Bridgend		Methodist / URC
Uniting Church, Sketty	Sketty, Swansea	1832	Methodist / URC
Van Road URC, Caerphilly	Caerphilly, Caerphilly	1898	URC
Zion's Hill URC, Spittal	Spittal, Pembrokeshire	1823	URC

^{1}Baptist (GB), Baptist (Wales), CiW, Congregational, Methodist, Presbyterian, Independents, URC

=== Former URC churches in Wales Synod ===
Church	Location	Founded	Closed	Notes
Aberedw URC	Aberedw, Powys	C19th	2022	
Alpha URC, Greenfield	Greenfield, Flintshire	1814	2005	
Berea URC, Blaina	Blaina, Blaenau Gwent	1850	2002	
Bethesda URC, Tongwynlais	Tongwynlais, Cardiff	1861	2025	
Caersalem United Church, Ebbw Vale	Ebbw Vale, Blaenau Gwent		2017	URC involvement ended, continues as a Baptist church
Carmarthen Road URC, Swansea	Swansea, Swansea	1875	2019	
Cartmel URC, Nantmel	Nantmel, Powys	1831	2015	
Castle Square URC, Pontypridd	Treforest, Rhondda Cynon Taf	1905	2022	
Cefn Mawr URC	Cefn Mawr, Wrexham	1866	c. 2009	
Cefn-y-bedd URC, Cilmery	Cilmeri, Powys		2020	
Central Ecumenical Church, Maesteg	Maesteg, Bridgend	1847	2022	URC involvement ended, continues as a Baptist church
Christ Church, Fairwater	Fairwater, Cardiff	1958	2019	Methodist / URC
Christ Church, Johnstown	Johnstown, Wrexham	1881	c. 2011	
Christ Church URC, Llandaff North	Llandaff North, Cardiff	1904	2016	
Christ Church & Caebach URC, Llandrindod Wells	Llandrindod Wells, Powys	c. 1660	2019	
Clyro with Hay-on-Wye URC	Clyro, Powys	1890	2009	
Crundale URC	Crundale, Pembrokeshire	1837	2023	
Garn URC, Abercarn	Abercarn, Caerphilly	1841	2011	
Gnoll URC, Neath	Neath, Neath Port Talbot	1842	c. 2011	
Hannah Street URC, Cardiff	Butetown, Cardiff	1866	2003	
Hebron URC, Mostyn	Mostyn, Flintshire	1874	2021	
Llandeilo URC	Llandeilo, Carmarthenshire	1883	2008	
New Bethel URC, Mynyddislwyn	Mynyddislwyn, Caerphilly	1758	2021	
New Street United Church, Welshpool	Welshpool, Powys	c. 1780	2023	Presbyterian / URC
Newtown URC	Newtown, Powys	1818	2016	
Neyland URC	Neyland, Pembrokeshire	1864	c. 2000	
Northop URC	Northop, Flintshire	1879	2017	
Porth URC	Porth, Rhondda Cynon Taf	1882	2016	
Roath Park URC	Roath, Cardiff		c. 2009	
Saintwell URC	Ely, Cardiff	1892	2005	
St David's, Bettws	Bettws, Newport	1960s?	2019	URC involvement ended, continues as a CiW church
St David's Uniting Church, Pentwyn	Pentwyn, Cardiff	1978	2019	URC involvement ended, continues as a CiW church
Tabernacl URC, Narberth	Narberth, Pembrokeshire		c. 2009	
Tabor URC, Maesycwmmer	Maesycwmmer, Caerphilly	1829	2002	
Talgarth United Free Church	Talgarth, Powys		2021	Baptist (GB) / Presbyterian / URC
The Church in the Park, Old Colwyn	Old Colwyn, Conwy	1898	2020	
Trinity URC, Pembroke Dock	Pembroke Dock, Pembrokeshire	1867	c. 2011	
Trinity URC, Swansea	Swansea, Swansea		c. 2009	
Wesley United Church, Abercynon	Abercynon, Rhondda Cynon Taf	1928	2017	Methodist / URC
Zion URC, Newbridge	Newbridge, Caerphilly	1884	2006	
Zion URC, Wattsville	Wattsville, Caerphilly	1907	2002	

== Wessex Synod ==
Church	Location	Founded	Denomination
Aston Tirrold URC	Aston Tirrold, Oxfordshire	1662	URC
Avenue St Andrew's URC, Southampton	Southampton, Hampshire	1662	URC
Beacon Hill URC, Hindhead	Hindhead, Surrey		URC
Bell Street United Church, Shaftesbury	Shaftesbury, Dorset	c. 1670	Methodist / URC
Bishop's Waltham United Free Church	Bishop's Waltham, Hampshire		Methodist / URC
Bitterne URC	Bitterne, Hampshire		URC
Bitterne Park URC	Bitterne Park, Hampshire		URC
Holy Family, Blackbird Leys	Blackbird Leys, Oxfordshire		CoE / Baptist / Methodist / URC / Moravian
Blandford Forum URC	Blandford Forum, Dorset	1661	URC
Bournemouth International Church	Bournemouth, Dorset		URC
Braishfield URC	Braishfield, Hampshire	1818	URC
Bridport United Church	Bridport, Dorset		Methodist / URC
Brill URC	Brill, Buckinghamshire		URC
Broad Chalke URC	Broad Chalke, Wiltshire	pre-1818	URC
Broadstone URC	Broadstone, Dorset	1847	URC
Buckland URC, Portsmouth	Buckland, Hampshire		URC
Burton Green URC	Burton, Dorset		URC
Caversham Park Church	Caversham Park, Berkshire	early 1970s	CoE / Baptist / Methodist / URC
Cheap Street Church, Sherborne	Sherborne, Dorset	c. 1824	Methodist / URC
Christ Church, Chineham	Chineham, Hampshire		CoE / Baptist / Methodist / URC
Christ Church URC, Henley	Henley-on-Thames, Oxfordshire	1662	URC
Christ Church URC, Marlow	Marlow, Buckinghamshire	c. 1700	URC
Christ Church, Woodley	Woodley, Berkshire	1834	Methodist / URC
Christ Church URC, Windsor	Windsor, Berkshire		URC
Christ Church, Thame	Thame, Oxfordshire		Methodist / URC
Church on the Heath	Elvetham Heath, Hampshire		CoE / Baptist / Methodist / URC
Collinwood Road URC, Oxford	Risinghurst, Oxfordshire		URC
Cumnor URC	Cumnor, Oxfordshire	1845	URC
Drayton United Church	Drayton, Hampshire		Methodist / URC
East Cliff Church, Bournemouth	Bournemouth, Dorset	1868	URC
Elstead URC	Elstead, Surrey		URC
Fareham URC	Fareham, Hampshire	1691	URC
Faringdon United Church	Faringdon, Oxfordshire		Methodist / URC
The Spire Church, Farnham	Farnham, Surrey	1870s	Methodist / URC
Fleet URC	Fleet, Hampshire		URC
Fovant URC	Fovant, Wiltshire		URC
Godalming United Church	Godalming, Surrey		Methodist / URC
St Columba's URC, Gosport	Gosport, Hampshire		URC
Grange URC, Reading	Southcote, Berkshire	1954	URC
St Saviour URC, Guernsey	St Saviour, Guernsey		URC
Havant URC	Havant, Hampshire	1710	URC
High Cross Church, Camberley	Camberley, Surrey		Methodist / URC
Hope URC, Weymouth	Weymouth, Dorset		URC
Hungerford URC	Hungerford, Berkshire		URC
Cornerstone URC, Hythe	Hythe, Hampshire		URC
Iford URC	Iford, Dorset		URC
Isaac Watts Memorial URC, Southampton	Southampton, Hampshire		URC
St John URC, Jersey	St John, Jersey	pre-1809	URC
London Street URC, Basingstoke	Basingstoke, Hampshire	1663	URC
Longham URC, Ferndown	Ferndown, Dorset	pre-1819	URC
Lymington URC	Lymington, Hampshire		URC
Maidenhead URC	Maidenhead, Berkshire	1662	URC
Marsh Gibbon URC	Marsh Gibbon, Buckinghamshire		URC
Marston URC	Marston, Oxfordshire		URC
Mere URC	Mere, Wiltshire		URC
Christ Church URC, Milton	Milton, Hampshire		URC
Emmanuel, Normandy	Normandy, Surrey	1825	URC
Park URC, Reading	Reading, Berkshire	1907	URC
Parkstone URC, Poole	Parkstone, Dorset	late C19th	URC
Peachcroft Christian Centre, Abingdon	Abingdon, Oxfordshire	1987	CoE / Baptist / Methodist / URC
Pear Tree Green URC, Southampton	Woolston, Hampshire		URC
Petersfield and Liss URC	Petersfield, Hampshire		URC
Portsmouth Road URC, Guildford	Guildford, Surrey		URC
Radipole URC	Radipole, Dorset		URC
St. Andrew's Church, Richmond Hill	Bournemouth, Dorset	1856	URC
Rowlands Castle URC	Rowland's Castle, Hampshire		URC
Ryde URC	Ryde, Isle of Wight		URC
Salisbury URC	Salisbury, Wiltshire	1662	URC
Shanklin URC	Shanklin, Isle of Wight	1841	URC
Skinner Street URC, Poole	Poole, Dorset	1662	URC
High Cross URC, Somerford	Somerford, Dorset		URC
South Hayling URC	Hayling Island, Hampshire	1811	URC
Immanuel URC, Southbourne	Southbourne, Dorset	1910	URC
St Andrew's URC, Walton-on-Thames	Walton-on-Thames, Surrey	1930s	URC
St Andrew's URC, Reading	Reading, Berkshire	1875	URC
St Columba's URC, Oxford	Oxford, Oxfordshire	1915	URC
St Francis, Banbury	Banbury, Oxfordshire		CoE / Methodist / URC
St Mark's Shared Church, Bordon	Bordon, Hampshire	1982	CoE / Methodist / URC
St Martin's URC, West Moors	West Moors, Dorset	1903	URC
Banbury URC	Banbury, Oxfordshire		URC
St Paul's URC, Liss	Liss, Hampshire		URC
St Paul's URC, Bracknell	Bracknell, Berkshire	1825	URC
St Peter's Shared Church, Guildford	Guildford, Surrey	1952	CoE / URC
Swanage URC	Swanage, Dorset	1703	URC
Tadley URC	Tadley, Hampshire	late C17th	URC
Thatcham URC	Thatcham, Berkshire	1800	URC
Abbey URC, Romsey	Romsey, Hampshire		URC
The Beacon Church, Canford Heath	Canford Heath, Dorset	1968	URC
United Church, Winchester	Winchester, Hampshire		Methodist / URC
Three Legged Cross URC	Three Legged Cross, Dorset	1890	URC
Tilehurst URC	Tilehurst, Berkshire		URC
Trinity URC, Charminster	Charminster, Dorset		URC
Trinity Church, Abingdon	Abingdon, Oxfordshire	c. 1689	Methodist / URC
Trinity Church, Earley	Lower Earley, Berkshire	1983	CoE / Methodist / URC
Trinity Church, Totton	Totton and Eling, Hampshire		Methodist / URC
Trinity United Church, Ringwood	Ringwood, Hampshire		Methodist / URC
Twyford URC	Twyford, Buckinghamshire		URC
Twyford URC	Twyford, Berkshire	1796	URC
United Church, Dorchester	Dorchester, Dorset		Methodist / URC
United Church, Ferndown	Ferndown, Dorset		Baptist / URC
United Church of Egham	Egham, Surrey		Methodist / URC
St Francis, Valley Park	Chandler's Ford, Hampshire	1987	CoE / Methodist / URC
Verwood URC	Verwood, Dorset	1802	URC
Wareham URC	Wareham, Dorset	1662	URC
Warsash URC	Warsash, Hampshire	1811	URC
Waterside URC, Emsworth	Emsworth, Hampshire		URC
Westborough URC	Westborough, Surrey		URC
Weybridge URC	Weybridge, Surrey	1843	URC
Wheatley URC	Wheatley, Oxfordshire	1794	URC
Wimborne URC	Wimborne Minster, Dorset	1672	URC
Woking URC	Woking, Surrey	1899	URC

=== Former URC churches in Wessex Synod ===
Church	Location	Founded	Closed	Notes
Andover URC	Andover, Hampshire		2022	
Chandler's Ford URC	Chandler's Ford, Hampshire	1929	2021	URC
Christ Church, Creekmoor	Creekmoor, Dorset		2016	URC involvement ended, continues as a CoE church
East Howe URC	East Howe, Dorset	1834	2008	
Finchdean Chapel	Finchdean, Hampshire		2019	
Fordingbridge URC	Fordingbridge, Hampshire	1660s	2024	
Freemantle URC, Southampton	Freemantle, Hampshire	1885	2019	
Hedge End URC	Hedge End, Hampshire	1909	2023	
Hope URC, Freshwater	Freshwater, Isle of Wight	1880s	2021	
Immanuel, Hatch Warren	Hatch Warren, Hampshire	c. 1995	2007	Official URC (and Methodist) involvement ended, still a CoE church
Longfleet URC	Longfleet, Dorset	1892	2021	
Lord's Hill Church	Lordshill, Hampshire	1981	2016	URC involvement ended, continues as an ecumenical church
Lovedean URC	Lovedean, Hampshire	1966	2016	
Lytchett Minster URC	Lytchett Minster, Dorset	late C18th	2016	
Medstead URC	Medstead, Hampshire	1890s	2019	
Newbury URC	Newbury, Berkshire	1662	2015	
Pheasants Hill URC	Hambleden, Buckinghamshire	1810	2016	Part of Christ Church Henley from 2009
Pokesdown United Reformed Church	Pokesdown, Bournemouth	1820	2001	now converted into flats
Portland URC	Portland, Dorset	1825	2009	
St. Andrew's Church, Exeter Road	Bournemouth	1888	2013	now a nightclub
St Edith's, Wilton	Wilton, Wiltshire	early C18th	2004	Methodist / URC
St Peter's, Chertsey	Chertsey, Surrey		2014	URC (and Methodist) involvement ended, continues as a CoE church
Sarisbury Green URC	Sarisbury, Hampshire	c. 1800	2022	URC
Summertown URC	Summertown, Oxfordshire	1824	2022	URC
Temple Cowley URC	Cowley, Oxfordshire	1878	2017	
Three Mile Cross United Church	Three Mile Cross, Berkshire		c. 2009	United church
Throop URC, Bournemouth	Throop, Dorset	1881	2009	
Tower Road URC, Hindhead	Hindhead, Surrey	1896	2002	
Upwey URC	Upwey, Dorset		1992	
Ventnor URC	Ventnor, Isle of Wight	1836	2007	
Walkford URC, Highcliffe	Highcliffe, Dorset		2021	
Winton URC, Bournemouth	Winton, Dorset	1868	2020	
Wonersh URC	Wonersh, Surrey		2025	
Woodley Airfield Church	Woodley, Berkshire	1994	2023	CoE / Methodist / URC
Worplesdon URC	Worplesdon, Surrey	1822	2020	

== West Midlands Synod ==
Church	Location	Founded	Denomination
Abbey Hill URC, Kenilworth	Kenilworth, Warwickshire	c. 1720	URC
Ansty Road URC, Coventry	Coventry, West Midlands		URC
Ashcroft Church, Cirencester	Cirencester, Gloucestershire		Methodist / URC
Baginton Road URC, Coventry	Coventry, West Midlands		URC
Banners Gate Community Church, Sutton Coldfield	Sutton Coldfield, West Midlands		Baptist / URC
Baxter URC, Kidderminster	Kidderminster, Worcestershire	pre-1884	URC
Beacon Church Centre, Rubery	Rubery, Worcestershire	c. 1850	URC
Bishop Latimer United Church, Winson Green	Winson Green	1904	CoE / URC
Blakenhall URC	Blakenhall, West Midlands		URC
Brinklow URC	Brinklow, Warwickshire		URC
Broadway URC, Walsall	Walsall, West Midlands	1859	URC
Broadway URC, Worcester	Worcester, Worcestershire	1792	URC
Brockworth URC	Brockworth, Gloucestershire		URC
Burslem URC	Burslem, Staffordshire		URC
Chesterton URC	Chesterton, Staffordshire		URC
Christ Church, Nailsworth	Nailsworth, Gloucestershire	1662	Baptist / Methodist / URC
Christ Church, Tetbury	Tetbury, Gloucestershire		Methodist / URC
Christ Church, Oswestry	Oswestry, Shropshire		Presbyterian (Wales) / URC
Christchurch Abbeydale, Gloucester	Abbeydale, Gloucestershire	1970s/80s	Baptist / CoE / Methodist / URC
Christ Church, Hall Green	Hall Green, West Midlands		Baptist / URC
Church Stretton URC	Church Stretton, Shropshire	1860	URC
Digbeth-in-the-Field URC	Yardley, West Midlands	1938	URC
Dovaston & Wilcot URC	Kynaston, Shropshire	pre-1879	URC
Drybrook URC	Drybrook, Gloucestershire		URC
Dursley Tabernacle URC	Dursley, Gloucestershire		URC
Eignbrook URC, Hereford	Hereford, Herefordshire		URC
Elmwood URC, Handsworth Wood	Handsworth Wood, West Midlands	1802	URC
Emmanuel Church, Redditch	Redditch, Worcestershire	pre-1976	Methodist / URC
Erdington URC	Erdington, West Midlands	1820	URC
Foleshill Road URC, Coventry	Foleshill, West Midlands		URC
Hall Green United Community Church	Hall Green, West Midlands	1909	Methodist / Moravian / URC
Hampton Park URC, Hereford	Hereford, Herefordshire	1969	URC
Hodge Hill Church	Hodge Hill, West Midlands		CoE / URC
Holly Mount URC, Malvern	Great Malvern, Worcestershire		URC
Holyhead Road URC, Coventry	Coventry, West Midlands	pre-1953	URC
Horeston Grange Church, Nuneaton	Horeston Grange, Warwickshire		CoE / Methodist / URC
Huntington URC	Huntington, Herefordshire		URC
Keresley URC, Coventry	Keresley, West Midlands		URC
Knowle URC	Knowle, West Midlands	1828	URC
Lea Road UR Community Church, Wolverhampton	Penn Fields, West Midlands		URC
Lillington Free Church, Leamington Spa	Lillington, Warwickshire	1952	URC
Littledean URC	Littledean, Gloucestershire		URC
Lodge Road Church, Winson Green	Winson Green, West Midlands		URC
Longton URC	Longton, Staffordshire		URC
Lydney URC	Lydney, Gloucestershire		URC
Malvern Link URC	Malvern Link, Worcestershire	1835	URC
Nuneaton URC	Nuneaton, Warwickshire	c. 1700	URC
Oakengates United Church, Telford	Oakengates, Shropshire		Methodist / URC
Oldfallings URC, Wolverhampton	Wolverhampton, West Midlands		URC
Penn URC	Penn, West Midlands		URC
Preeshenlle URC, Gobowen	Gobowen, Shropshire		URC
Prestbury URC	Prestbury, Gloucestershire	1866	URC
Pype Hayes URC	Pype Hayes, West Midlands		URC
Quarry Chapel, Cam	Cam, Gloucestershire		URC
Radford Road United Church, Leamington Spa	Leamington Spa, Warwickshire	1872	Methodist / URC
Rosborough Tabernacle URC	Rodborough, Gloucestershire		URC
Rugby URC	Rugby, Warwickshire		URC
Shrewsbury URC	Shrewsbury, Shropshire	1862	URC
Solihull URC	Solihull, West Midlands	1825	URC
South Aston URC	Aston, West Midlands	pre-1960	URC
St Andrew's URC, Wall Heath	Wall Heath, West Midlands		URC
St Andrew's URC, Cheltenham	Cheltenham, Gloucestershire		URC
St Andrew's, Sedgley	Sedgley, West Midlands		Methodist / URC
St Columba's URC, Moseley	Moseley, West Midlands		URC
St Columba's URC, Wolverhampton	Finchfield, West Midlands	pre-1957	URC
St John's, Stone	Stone, Staffordshire		Methodist / URC
St Michael & All Angels, All Stretton	All Stretton, Shropshire		CoE / URC
St Paul's, Balsall Heath	Balsall Heath, West Midlands	1852	CoE / URC
St Paul's United Church, Rugeley	Rugeley, Staffordshire		Methodist / URC
Stratford-upon-Avon URC	Stratford-upon-Avon, Warwickshire		URC
Sutton Coldfield URC	Sutton Coldfield, West Midlands		URC
Swindon URC	Swindon, Staffordshire		URC
Tettenhall Wood URC, Wolverhampton	Tettenhall Wood, West Midlands		URC
The Church at Carrs Lane	Birmingham, West Midlands	1748	Methodist / URC
The Church at Perton	Perton, Staffordshire	c. 1950s/60s	CoE / URC
Warden Hill, Cheltenham	Cheltenham, Gloucestershire		CoE / URC
The Cotteridge Church	Cotteridge, West Midlands	1898	CoE / Methodist / URC
The Old Meeting URC, Bedworth	Bedworth, Warwickshire		URC
United Church, Lye	Lye, West Midlands		Methodist / URC
Tomkin Mission	Stanley, Staffordshire	1837	URC
Trinity Church, Leek	Leek, Staffordshire	c. 1695	Methodist / URC
Trinity Church, Stafford	Stafford, Staffordshire	1662	Methodist / URC
Trinity Church, Newport	Newport, Shropshire	1765	Methodist / URC
Trinity Church, Atherstone	Atherstone, Warwickshire		Methodist / URC
Uttoxeter URC	Uttoxeter, Staffordshire		URC
Wade Street Church, Lichfield	Lichfield, Staffordshire	1790	Baptist / URC
Weoley Castle Community Church	Weoley Castle, West Midlands		URC
Weoley Hill URC	Selly Oak, West Midlands	1915	URC
Wilton Road URC, Handsworth	Handsworth, West Midlands		URC
Wistanswick URC	Wistanswick, Shropshire		URC
Wombourne URC	Wombourne, Staffordshire	1835	URC
Worcester URC	Worcester, Worcestershire		URC
Wotton United Church	Wotton-under-Edge, Gloucestershire	c. 1775	Methodist / URC
Wylde Green URC	Wylde Green, West Midlands		URC
Zion URC, Langley	Langley Green, West Midlands		URC

=== Former URC churches in West Midlands Synod ===
Church	Location	Founded	Closed	Notes
Blackheath URC	Blackheath, West Midlands	1900	2008	
Bloomsbury URC Centre, Nechells	Nechells, West Midlands	pre-1959	c. 2013	
Bournville URC	Bournville, West Midlands	1906	2023	
Brierley URC	Brierley, Gloucestershire	1884	2017	
Bromsgrove URC	Bromsgrove, Worcestershire	1672	2013	
Brownshill Green URC	Brownshill Green, West Midlands	1880	2014	
Cannock URC	Cannock, Staffordshire	1814	2009	
Cartway UR & Methodist Church, Bridgnorth	Bridgnorth, Shropshire		2021	Methodist / URC
Christ Church Painswick	Painswick, Gloucestershire	1656	2010	Baptist / URC
Christ Church, Ross-on-Wye	Ross-on-Wye, Herefordshire	C17th	2022	Methodist / URC
Clayton URC	Clayton, Staffordshire	1952	2012	
Coleshill United Church	Coleshill, Warwickshire	1900	2023	Methodist / URC
Dodington URC, Whitchurch	Whitchurch, Shropshire	1662	2006	
Dudley URC	Dudley, West Midlands	1840	2020	
Gloucester URC	Gloucester, Gloucestershire	1872	2018	
Gorsty Hill United Church	Tean, Staffordshire		2016	URC involvement ended, continues as a Methodist church
Halesowen URC	Halesowen, West Midlands		2021	
Hatherton URC, Walsall	Walsall, West Midlands	1881	2022	
Newent URC	Newent, Gloucestershire	1846	2022	
Newton Road URC, Great Barr	Great Barr, West Midlands	1917	2017	
Potters Green URC, Coventry	Potters Green, Warwickshire	1819	2022	
Rushall URC	Rushall, West Midlands	1861	2013	
Salem URC, Great Bridge	Great Bridge, West Midlands	1835	2004	
Sharpness URC	Sharpness, Gloucestershire	1879	2016	
Silverdale URC, Newcastle-under-Lyme	Silverdale, Staffordshire	1867	2004	
St Columba's URC, Coventry	Coventry, West Midlands	1926	2020	
St John's URC, Stourbridge	Stourbridge, West Midlands	1672	2016	
St Michael's & All Angels, Stourport-on-Severn	Stourport-on-Severn, Worcestershire		2016	URC involvement ended, continues as a CoE church
St Nicholas, Warndon	Warndon, Worcestershire	1991	2020	URC involvement ended, continues as a CoE/Methodist church
St Ninian's URC, Solihull	Solihull, West Midlands	1946	2007	
Trinity Church, Baddesley Ensor	Baddesley Ensor, Warwickshire	1863	2009	Methodist / URC
Trinity Church, Burton-upon-Trent	Burton-upon-Trent, Staffordshire		2011	Methodist / URC
Trinity Church, Hednesford	Hednesford, Staffordshire	1873	2023	Methodist / URC
Union Free Church, Wellington	Wellington, Shropshire		2018	
Warwick Road URC, Coventry	Coventry, West Midlands	1724	2021	
Welsh Frankton URC	Ellesmere, Shropshire		2021	
West Bromwich URC	West Bromwich, West Midlands	1662	2005	
Whixall URC, Stanley Green	Whixall, Shropshire	1805	c. 2011	
Wollerton URC	Wollerton, Shropshire		2022	
Wolstanton URC	Wolstanton, Staffordshire	1902	2021	URC

== Yorkshire Synod ==
Church	Location	Founded	Denomination
Beeston Hill United Free Church	Beeston, West Yorkshire		Baptist / Methodist / URC
Bilton Grange URC	Harrogate, North Yorkshire		URC
Bingley URC	Bingley, West Yorkshire		URC
Bolton Villas Family Church	Bradford, West Yorkshire		URC
Bridge Church, Otley	Otley, West Yorkshire	1821	URC
Central URC, Sheffield	Sheffield, South Yorkshire	1660	URC
Central Church, Goole	Goole, East Riding of Yorkshire		Methodist / URC
Christ Church, Swanland	Swanland, East Riding of Yorkshire	1693	Methodist / URC
Christ Church, Halifax	Hipperholme, West Yorkshire		Methodist / URC
Christ Church, Stocksbridge	Stocksbridge, South Yorkshire	1860	Methodist / URC
Christ Church URC, South Ella	Kirk Ella, East Riding of Yorkshire		URC
Christ Church, Ilkley	Ilkley, West Yorkshire	early C19th	Methodist / URC
Zion URC, Cottingham	Cottingham, East Riding of Yorkshire		URC
The Church of Christ in Darnall	Darnall, South Yorkshire		CoE / Methodist / URC
Denholme Shared Church	Denholme, West Yorkshire		CoE / Baptist / URC
Dore and Totley URC	Totley, South Yorkshire	1888	URC
Elloughton URC	Elloughton, East Riding of Yorkshire		URC
Emmanuel St John's, Scarborough	Scarborough, North Yorkshire		Methodist / URC
Flowergate URC, Whitby	Whitby, North Yorkshire	1878	URC
Gleadless URC	Gleadless, South Yorkshire		URC
Grove URC, Gomersal	Gomersal, West Yorkshire		URC
Christ Church, Halton	Halton, West Yorkshire		Methodist / URC
St Columba's URC, Headingley	Headingley, West Yorkshire	1856	URC
Heath URC, Halifax	Halifax, West Yorkshire		URC
Heckmondwike URC	Heckmondwike, West Yorkshire		URC
Stag Community Church (Herringthorpe URC)	Rotherham, South Yorkshire	1958	URC
Heywood URC, Northowram	Northowram, West Yorkshire		URC
Holme URC	Holme Wood, West Yorkshire		URC
Hornsea URC	Hornsea, East Riding of Yorkshire	1798	URC
Idle Upper Chapel URC	Idle, West Yorkshire		URC
Ardeen Road URC, Doncaster	Doncaster, South Yorkshire		URC
Kirkheaton United Church	Kirkheaton, West Yorkshire		Methodist / URC
Knaresborough URC	Knaresborough, North Yorkshire		URC
Knottingley URC	Knottingley, West Yorkshire	1804	URC
St Luke's, Lodge Moor	Lodge Moor, South Yorkshire		CoE / Baptist / Methodist / URC
Longcauseway Church	Dewsbury, West Yorkshire	1815	Methodist / URC
Meersbrook Park URC	Sheffield, South Yorkshire		URC
The Michael Church, Lowedges	Sheffield, South Yorkshire		URC
Moldgreen URC	Moldgreen, West Yorkshire	1865	URC
New Hope URC, Halifax	Halifax, West Yorkshire		URC
New Providence URC, Ovenden	Ovenden, West Yorkshire		URC
Norristhorpe URC, Liversedge	Liversedge, West Yorkshire		URC
Northcliffe Church	Shipley, West Yorkshire		Methodist / URC
Zion URC, Oughtibridge	Oughtibridge, South Yorkshire		URC
Portholme Church	Selby, North Yorkshire		Methodist / URC
Providence URC, Dacre	Dacre, North Yorkshire	1827	URC
Pudsey URC	Pudsey, West Yorkshire		URC
Ravensthorpe with Hopton URC	Ravensthorpe, West Yorkshire		URC
Riddlesden URC	Riddlesden, West Yorkshire		URC
Salem URC, Burley-in-Wharfedale	Burley-in-Wharfedale, West Yorkshire	1839	URC
Saltaire URC	Saltaire, West Yorkshire	1857	URC
Shiregreen URC	Shiregreen, South Yorkshire		URC
St Andrew's URC, Scarborough	Scarborough, North Yorkshire		URC
St Andrew's, Penistone	Penistone, South Yorkshire		Methodist / URC
St Andrew's URC, Sheffield	Sheffield, South Yorkshire	1853	URC
St Andrew's URC, Roundhay	Roundhay, West Yorkshire		URC
St Andrew's, Skipton	Skipton, North Yorkshire		Methodist / URC
St Columba's URC, York	York, North Yorkshire	1749	URC
St James' URC, Sheffield	Sheffield, South Yorkshire		URC
St Mary's in the Wood URC, Morley	Morley, West Yorkshire		URC
St Ninian's & St Andrew's URC, Hull	Kingston upon Hull, East Riding of Yorkshire	1643	URC
St Paul's URC, Harrogate	Harrogate, North Yorkshire		URC
Stainbeck URC	Leeds, West Yorkshire	1931	URC
The King's Way Church, Ossett	Ossett, West Yorkshire		Methodist / URC
South Leeds URC	Leeds, West Yorkshire		URC
Toll Gavel United Church, Beverley	Beverley, East Riding of Yorkshire	1759	Methodist / URC
Trinity URC, Barnsley	Barnsley, South Yorkshire		URC
Trinity URC, Sheffield	Sheffield, South Yorkshire		URC
Trinity Church, Rawdon	Rawdon, West Yorkshire		Baptist / Methodist / URC
Trinity Church, Honley	Honley, West Yorkshire		Methodist / URC
Trinity United Church, Harehills	Harehills, West Yorkshire		Methodist / URC
Emmanuel, Waterthorpe	Waterthorpe, South Yorkshire	1970s	CoE / Baptist / Methodist / URC
Waverley URC, Huddersfield	Huddersfield, West Yorkshire		URC
West Melton URC	Wath-upon-Dearne, South Yorkshire	1797	URC
West Park URC, Harrogate	Harrogate, North Yorkshire	1813	URC
West Park URC, Leeds	Leeds, West Yorkshire		URC
Westfield URC, Wyke	Bradford, West Yorkshire		URC
Wigton Moor URC, Leeds	Leeds, West Yorkshire		URC
Trinity Church, Wilsden	Wilsden, West Yorkshire		Methodist / URC
Withernsea URC	Withernsea, East Riding of Yorkshire		URC

=== Former URC churches in Yorkshire Synod ===
Church	Location	Founded	Closed	Notes
Brackenhall URC, Huddersfield	Sheepridge, West Yorkshire	1939	2024	
Brotherton URC	Brotherton, North Yorkshire	1838	2016	
Christ Church URC, Castleford	Castleford, West Yorkshire	1859	2023	
Christ Church with Trinity URC, North Ferriby	North Ferriby, East Riding of Yorkshire		2021	
Clayton West URC	Clayton West, West Yorkshire	1794	2019	
Cornerstone Church, Great Horton	Great Horton, West Yorkshire	1861	2023	Methodist / URC
East Hull URC	Kingston upon Hull, East Riding of Yorkshire	1937	2020	
Eccleshill URC	Eccleshill, West Yorkshire	1823	2021	
Flanshaw URC	Flanshaw, West Yorkshire	1866	2024	
Frizinghall URC	Frizinghall, West Yorkshire	1877	2008	
Greasbrough United Church	Greasbrough, South Yorkshire		2021	Methodist / URC
Holderness Road URC, Hull	Kingston upon Hull, East Riding of Yorkshire	1872	2014	
Kimberworth Road URC, Rotherham	Rotherham, South Yorkshire	1893	2010	
Little Lane Church, Bradford	Heaton, West Yorkshire	1889	2019	Baptist / Methodist / URC
Luddendenfoot URC	Luddendenfoot, West Yorkshire	1859	2024	
Moor End URC, Mixenden	Mixenden, West Yorkshire	1688	2012	
Pickering URC	Pickering, North Yorkshire	1788	2021	
South Cave URC	South Cave, East Riding of Yorkshire	1662	2011	
Stainland & Holywell Green URC	Holywell Green, West Yorkshire	1813	2023	Two churches merged 1996
Stubbin Chapel URC, Elsecar	Elsecar, South Yorkshire	1839	2004	
Swinton URC	Swinton, South Yorkshire	1824	2005	
The Church in Cottingley	Cottingley, West Yorkshire	1974	2022	CoE / Methodist / URC
Trinity Church, Keighley	Keighley, West Yorkshire	1730	2022	Baptist / URC
United Church, Marsden	Marsden, West Yorkshire	1740s	2024	Methodist / URC
Wadsley URC, Sheffield	Sheffield, South Yorkshire	1909	2014	
Wesley Road Chapel, Armley	Armley, West Yorkshire	1866	2022	Baptist / Methodist / URC
Zion URC, Wakefield	Wakefield, West Yorkshire	1782	2002	

== Bibliography ==
- Facey, Roy A., ed. (1981). International Church Index (Doctrinal). Index Publications. ISBN 0-907578-00-4.
