= Parkstone United Reformed Church =

Church in Poole, Dorset, England

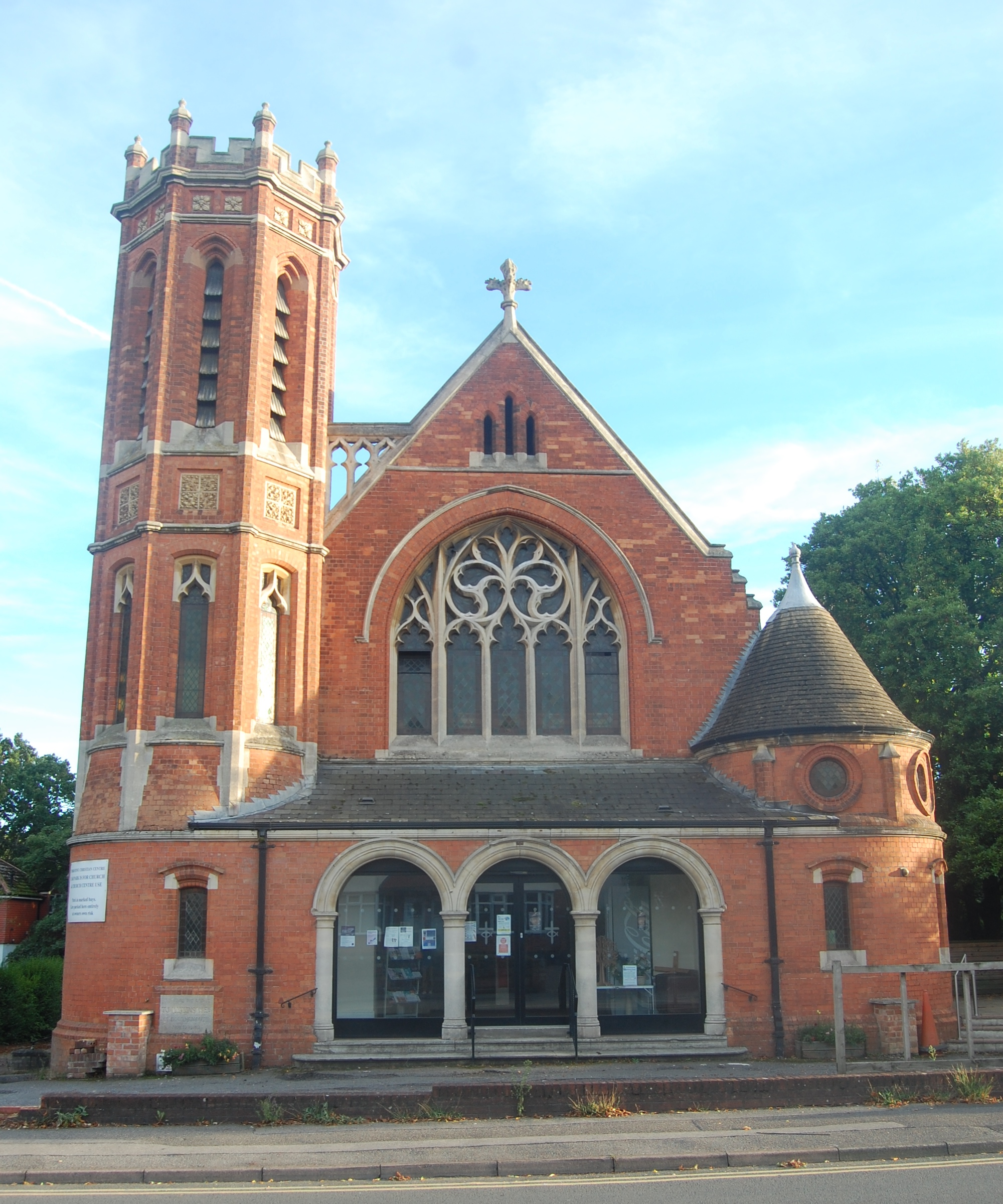
- Parkstone United Reformed Church in 2022

Religion
- Affiliation: United Reformed Church

Location
- Location: Parkstone, Poole, Dorset, England
- Interactive map of Parkstone United Reformed Church
- Coordinates: 50.723499°N 1.956660°W

Architecture
- Type: Church
- Style: Victorian
- Completed: 1830s

The Parkstone United Reformed Church is a historic building and church in the Parkstone area of Poole, Dorset, England.

== History ==
The church was constructed in the 1830s. The church was built with an ornate brick building and a hexagonal tower.

The church has been involved in community initiatives helping ex-offenders. The church is now named the Parkstone Christian Centre.

== See also ==
- List of churches in Poole
- List of churches in the United Reformed Church
