= St James's Church, Pokesdown =

Church in Bournemouth, Dorset, England

St James's Church
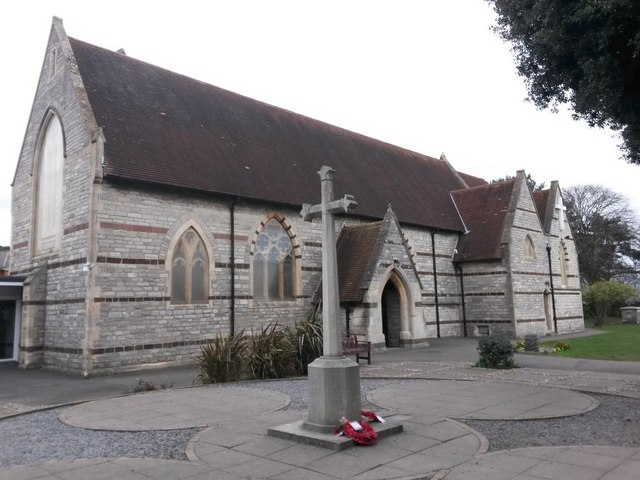
- St James's Church in 2017

Religion
- Affiliation: Anglicanism
- Ecclesiastical or organizational status: active

Location
- Location: Christchurch Road, Pokesdown, Bournemouth, Dorset, England
- Interactive map of St James's Church
- Coordinates: 50.732883°N 1.821737°W

Architecture
- Architect: George Edmund Street
- Type: Church
- Style: English Gothic architecture
- Completed: 1858

Website
- www.stjamespokesdown.co.uk

St James's Church is a Grade II listed church in the Pokesdown area of Bournemouth, Dorset, England.

== History ==
The church was completed in 1858 by George Edmund Street. The nave extension was the work of Charles Marriott Oldrid Scott from 1930 to 1931. The church is constructed with coursed Purbeck rubble.

== See also ==
- List of churches in Bournemouth
- List of Anglican churches
- List of new churches by G. E. Street
