= Pokesdown United Reformed Church =

Church in Bournemouth, Dorset, England

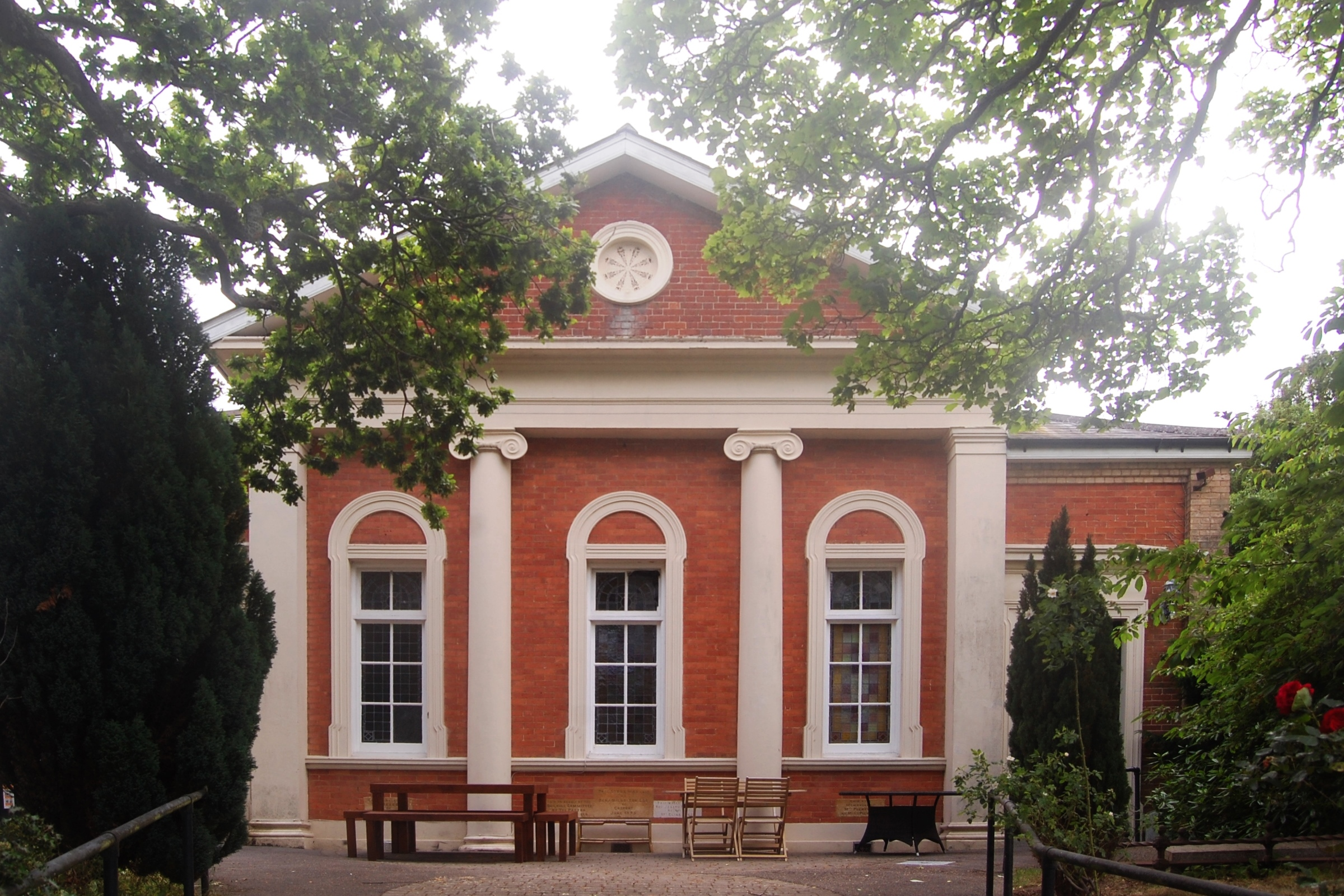
- Pokesdown United Reformed Church in 2022

Religion
- Affiliation: United Reformed Church
- Ecclesiastical or organizational status: defunct

Location
- Location: Pokesdown, Bournemouth, Dorset, England
- Interactive map of Pokesdown United Reformed Church
- Coordinates: 50.730794°N 1.81996°W

Architecture
- Type: Church
- Style: Regency architecture
- Completed: 1820
- Demolished: 2001

The Pokesdown United Reformed Church is a Grade II listed former church in the Pokesdown area of Bournemouth, Dorset, England.

== History ==
The church was constructed in 1820. On 27 February 1976, the church became Grade II listed. The church closed in 2001 and has since been converted into flats. The graveyard was exhumed in 2018. The bodies which were moved were reinterned at Kinson Cemetery.

== See also ==
- List of churches in Bournemouth
- List of churches in the United Reformed Church
