= St Margaret's United Reformed Church, Finchley =

Church in Finchley, London, England

Coordinates: 51.6006°N 0.1962°W

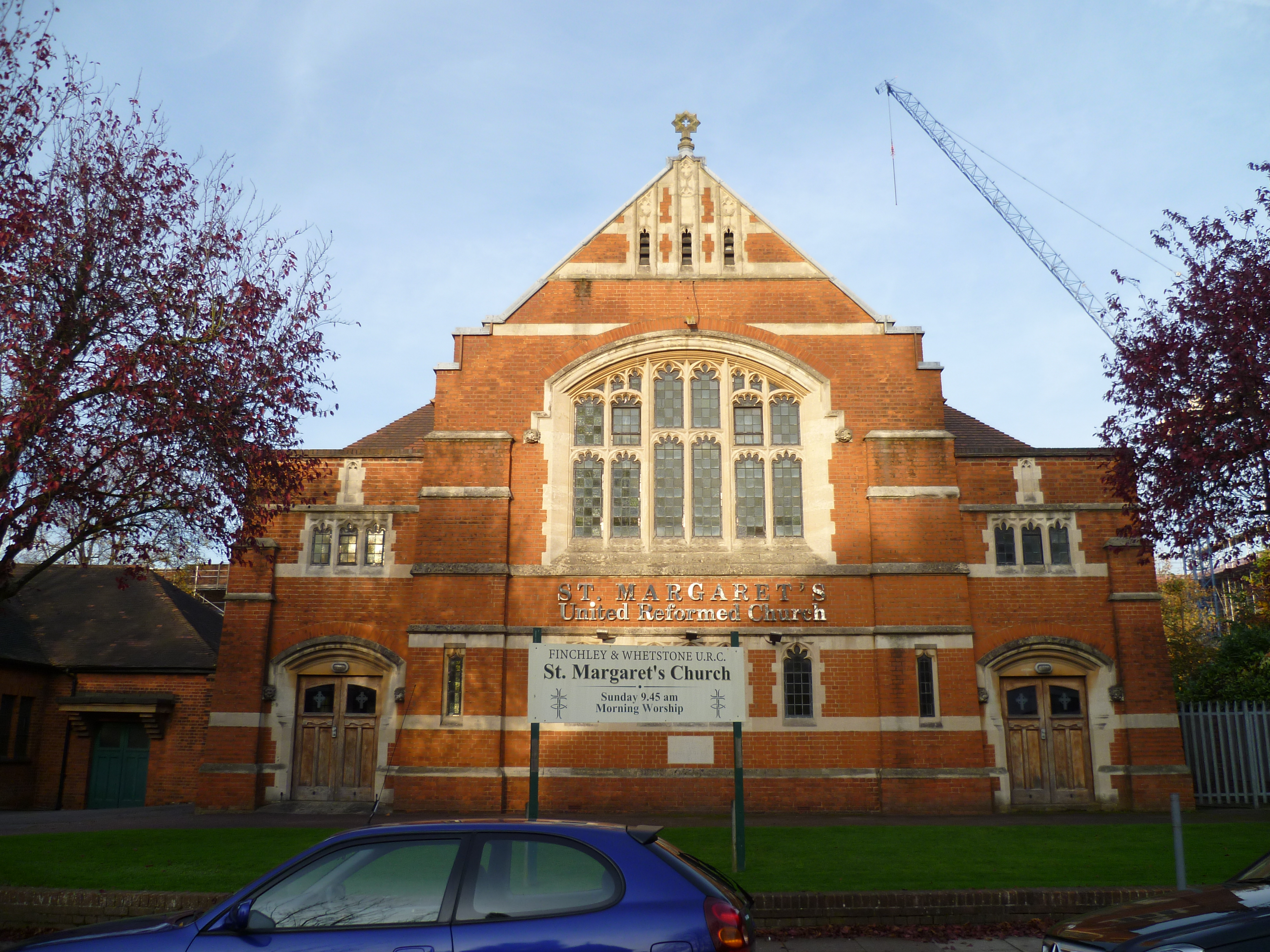
St Margaret's Church, Finchley

St Margaret's Church is a United Reformed Church in Finchley, London.
