= Roydon United Reformed Church =

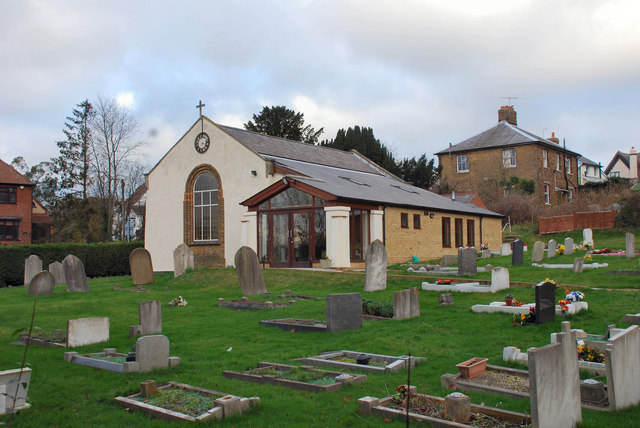
- Roydon United Reformed Church

- Location in Essex
- 51°46′17.17″N 0°2′45.77″E
- Location: Roydon, Essex
- Country: England
- Denomination: United Reformed Church
- Website: Roydon United Reformed Church

Architecture
- Functional status: Active

Roydon United Reformed Church is located in Harlow Road, Roydon, Essex, England.

== History ==
Roydon United Reformed church originated in 1798, when James Brown of Harlow opened a Baptist meeting house in Harlow Road, Roydon. It was reconstituted in 1811 as an Independent church. In 1851 the original building was replaced with a new chapel and soon after that the church was affiliated to the Essex Congregational Union. A manse was built east of the church in 1868. In 1933 the church was altered and enlarged. It had 31 members in 1981.

In 2011 the church held a celebration weekend, to celebrate the 200 year anniversary of the formation of an Independent (Congregational) Church in Roydon.
