= Pokesdown =

Coordinates: 50.731°N 1.816°W

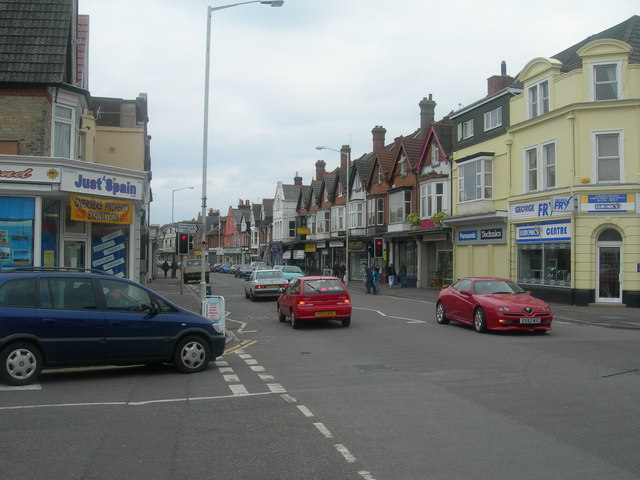
- Christchurch Road, looking towards Pokesdown

- Location within Dorset
- OS grid reference: SZ129924
- Unitary authority: Bournemouth, Christchurch and Poole
- Ceremonial county: Dorset
- Region: South West
- Country: England
- Sovereign state: United Kingdom
- Post town: BOURNEMOUTH
- Postcode district: BH5, BH6, BH7
- Dialling code: 01202
- Police: Dorset
- Fire: Dorset and Wiltshire
- Ambulance: South Western
- UK Parliament: Bournemouth East

Pokesdown is a suburb of Bournemouth, in the Bournemouth, Christchurch and Poole districts, in the ceremonial county of Dorset, England. It lies just east of Boscombe and west of Southbourne.

== History ==
It is believed that Pokesdown took its name from the Old English word Pucca, which referred to a type of mischievous sprite.

Evidence of human occupation in the area dates back to the Bronze Age. In 1909 when Lock's Field was being developed into what is now Hillbrow Road, Herbert Druitt of Christchurch obtained permission from the owner, Mr. F. Elcock, to excavate two barrows on the site, and a notable Bronze Age cremation cemetery was found. A number of urns were recovered, some of which were sent to the British Museum. In 1926 more urns were found around Harewood Avenue, and between Lascelles Road and Kings Park entrance.

There is some evidence, too, that people of the Iron Age were present in the locality. For instance an axe head from the period was found near St. James' Church.

In Norman times the area was part of the Liberty of Westover. A community formed in the shape of an agricultural settlement, the Pokesdown Farm, together with a small number of cottages for the farm workers situated adjoining the present Herberton Road, near its junction with Sunnyhill Road. The farm was on sloping ground running down from the heathland to the Stour River valley. Most of Pokesdown was on the higher plateau, which formed a tiny pan of the great heath. Life at the edge of the heath was not without benefits. Turf could be cut for fuel for fires and was free to all local inhabitants under the custom known as Turbary. There were also some grazing rights and honey was an important by-product of the bees which frequented the gorse and heather.

During the late eighteenth and early nineteenth centuries, the district began to grow in association with the nearby Stourfield House.

Pokesdown railway station was opened in 1886 and quickly became the heart of the area. Many other communal places sprang up around the station including the laundry and fire station.

On 31 December 1894 Pokesdown became a separate civil parish, being formed from part of Christchurch. In 1895, the Pokesdown Urban District was created establishing firm boundaries that were defined as running from the sea front to Wollstonecraft Road, and just east of Crabton Close Road, along south of Christchurch Road to Warwick Road, along the railway, which was crossed to take in Clarence Park, and so over part of King's Park to beyond Harewood Avenue. It then re-crossed Christchurch Road and the railway, running alongside the line to Cranleigh Road, after which it turned towards Southbourne Road, between Irving and Watcombe Roads. It then turned into Belle Vue Road and along Clifton Road to the sea front. Thus it included the Shelley, Portman, Stourwood and Stourfield Estates.

Eventually Pokesdown became more and more influenced by the phenomenal expansion of Bournemouth, so that ultimately in 1901 the district became incorporated into the newly formed County Borough. On 30 September 1902 the parish was abolished and merged with Bournemouth. In 1901 the parish had a population of 4930. It is now in the unparished area of Bournemouth.

== Religion ==
- Pokesdown United Reformed Church (formerly)
- St James's Church

== Politics ==
Pokesdown is part of the Boscombe East and Pokesdown ward for elections to Bournemouth, Christchurch and Poole Council.

Pokesdown is part of the Bournemouth East parliamentary constituency, for elections to the House of Commons of the United Kingdom.
