= Hampton Hill United Reformed Church =

Coordinates: 51.42375°N 0.3586°W

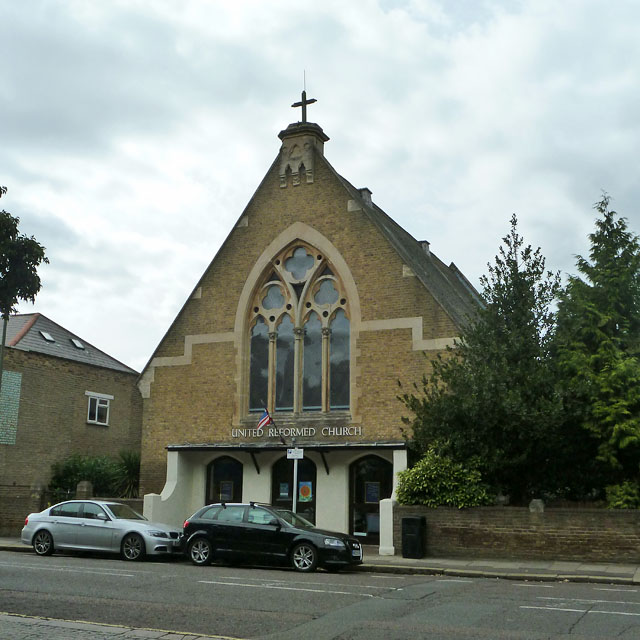
- Hampton Hill United Reformed Church
- Location: Hampton Hill
- Country: England
- Denomination: United Reformed
- Website: www.hamptonhillurc.org.uk

Architecture
- Functional status: Active

Hampton Hill United Reformed Church, in the London Borough of Richmond upon Thames, is a United Reformed Church congregation. Located on 35 High Street, Hampton Hill, opposite one of the gates to Bushy Park, it is a member of Churches Together Around Hampton. Its minister is Stephen Lewis.
