= United Reformed Church, Muswell Hill =

Church in London, England

Coordinates: 51.59158°N 0.14878°W

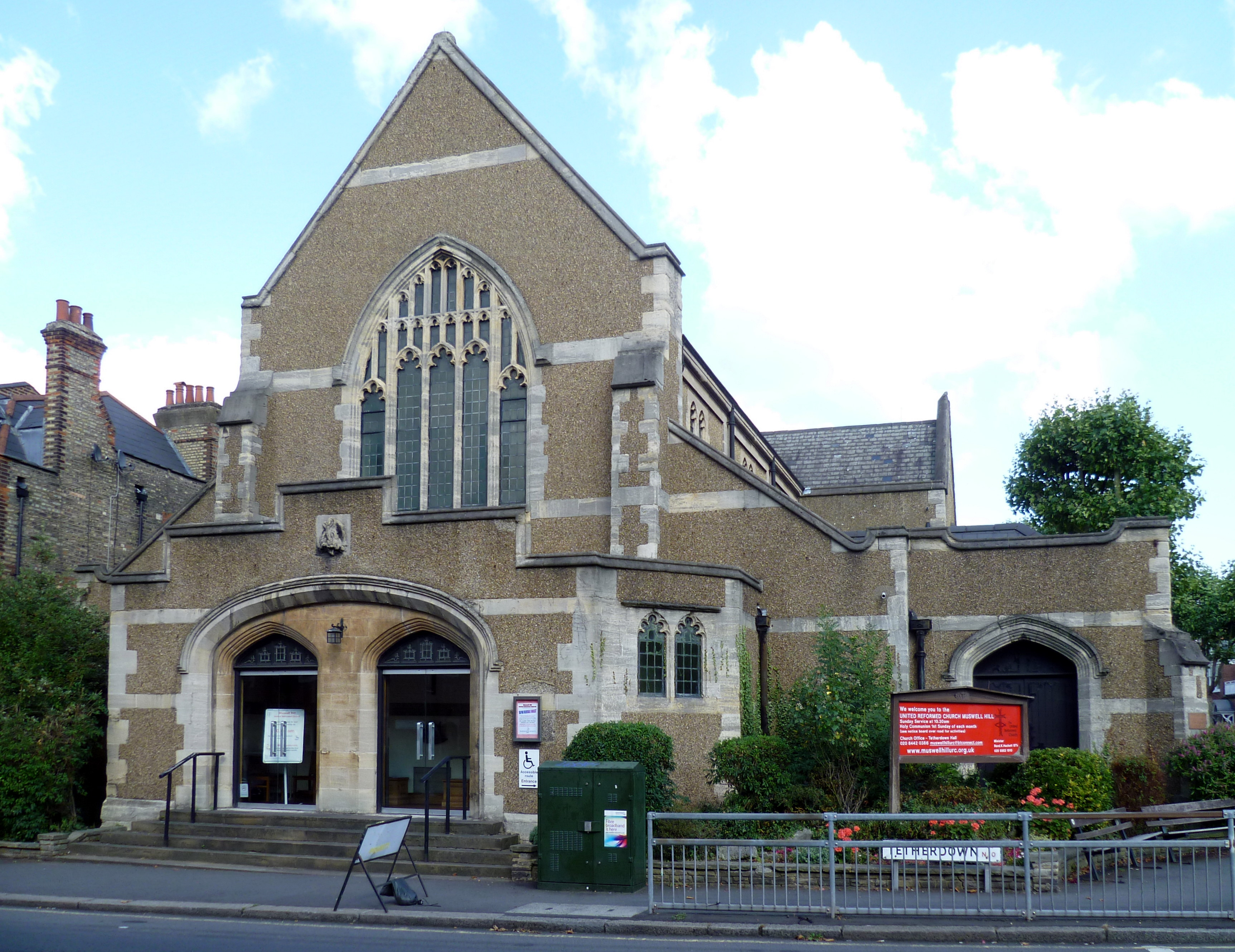
The United Reformed Church, Muswell Hill

The United Reformed Church, Muswell Hill, London, was located on the corner of Tetherdown and Queens Avenue. It had its final service in early June 2026.

However the building is still used for community use.
