= Tate (surname) =

Tate is an English surname.

== Geographical distribution ==
As of 2014, 65.2% of all known bearers of the surname Tate were residents of the United States (1:4,100), 13.9% of India (1:40,721), 8.5% of England (1:4,850), 2.6% of Australia (1:6,843), 1.6% of Canada (1:16,826) and 1.1% of Syria (1:13,112).

In England, the frequency of the surname was higher than average (1:4,850) in the following counties:

1. Tyne and Wear (1:1,073)
2. Northumberland (1:1,378)
3. Durham (1:1,404)
4. East Riding of Yorkshire (1:1,623)
5. West Yorkshire (1:1,816)
6. North Yorkshire (1:2,083)
7. Northamptonshire (1:2,447)
8. South Yorkshire (1:3,631)
9. East Sussex (1:3,643)
10. Isle of Wight (1:4,318)
11. Lincolnshire (1:4,460)
12. Nottinghamshire (1:4,481)
13. Norfolk (1:4,516)
14. Cumbria (1:4,564)
15. Suffolk (1:4,619)
16. Hertfordshire (1:4,800)
17. Wiltshire (1:4,813)

In the United States, the frequency of the surname was higher than average (1:4,100) in the following states:

1. Mississippi (1:1,128)
2. Tennessee (1:1,192)
3. Arkansas (1:1,594)
4. Louisiana (1:1,609)
5. Alabama (1:1,741)
6. Oklahoma (1:2,039)
7. North Carolina (1:2,154)
8. South Carolina (1:2,223)
9. Missouri (1:2,261)
10. Virginia (1:2,568)
11. Georgia (1:2,984)
12. Illinois (1:3,258)
13. Washington, D.C. (1:3,490)
14. West Virginia (1:3,577)
15. Maryland (1:3,875)
16. Texas (1:3,994)

== Notable people with the surname "Tate" include ==
=== A ===
- A. Austin Tate (1894–1943), American football player and coach
- Al Tate (1918–1993), American baseball player
- Alan Tate (born 1982), English football coach
- Albert Tate Jr. (1920–1986), American judge
- Allen Tate (1899–1979), American poet
- Allen Tate (musician) (born 1989), American vocalist
- Andrew Tate (born 1986), British-American kick boxer and Internet personality
- Arthur Tate (born 1939), American state legislator
- Auden Tate (born 1997), American football player
- Austin Tate (born 1951), English professor

=== B ===
- Baby Tate (1916–1972), American guitarist
- Baby Tate (rapper) (born 1996), American rapper
- Barbara Tate (1927–2009), British artist
- Ben Tate (born 1988), American football player
- Bennie Tate (1901–1973), American baseball player
- Bill Tate (disambiguation), multiple people
- Brandon Tate (born 1987), American football player
- Brent Tate (born 1982), Australian rugby league footballer
- Brian Tate (1921–2011), Northern Irish scholar
- Bruce Tate, American author
- Buddy Tate (1913–2001), American saxophonist

=== C ===
- Carnell Tate (born 2005), American football player
- Cassandra Tate (born 1990), American sprinter
- Catherine Tate (born 1969), British comedian and actress
- Cecil Tate (1908–1997), English cricketer
- Charlie Tate (1919–1996), American football player
- Chris Tate (footballer) (born 1977), English footballer
- Christopher G. Tate (born 1964), English biologist
- Claudia Tate (1947–2002), English professor
- Clyde J. Tate II (born 1957), American lawyer
- Cullen Tate (1886–1947), American film director

=== D ===
- Danny Tate (born 1955), American musician
- Darren Tate (born 1972), British musician
- Darwin William Tate (1889–1962), American politician
- Davanzo Tate (born 1985), American football player
- David Tate (disambiguation), multiple people
- Deborah Tate, American politician
- Derek Tate (born 1980), Australian cricketer
- Dillon Tate (born 1994), American baseball player
- Don Tate (born 1963), American author
- Donavan Tate (born 1990), American football player
- Doris Tate (1924–1992), American activist
- Drew Tate (born 1984), American football player

=== E ===
- Edward Tate (1877–1953), English cricketer
- Eleanora E. Tate (born 1948), American author
- Elizabeth Tate (1906–1999), American activist
- Emma Tate, British voice actress
- Emory Tate (1958–2015), American chess master
- E. Ridsdale Tate (1862–1922), British architect
- Erin Tate, American drummer
- Ernie Tate (1934–2021), Canadian political figure
- Erskine Tate (1895–1978), American violinist
- Ethlyn Tate (born 1966), Jamaican sprinter

=== F ===
- Farish Carter Tate (1856–1922), American politician
- Francis Tate (1560–1616), English politician
- Frank Tate (disambiguation), multiple people
- Fred Tate (1867–1943), English cricketer
- Frederick Tate (disambiguation), multiple people

=== G ===
- Geoff Tate (born 1959), American singer
- George Tate (disambiguation), multiple people
- Georges Tate (1943–2009), French historian
- Gerald J. Tate (born 1954), Northern Irish writer
- Golden Tate (born 1988), American football player
- Grady Tate (1932–2017), American drummer
- Greg Tate, American writer
- Greg Tate (footballer) (1925–2010), Australian rules footballer

=== H ===
- Harold Tate (disambiguation), multiple people
- Harry Tate (disambiguation), multiple people
- Henry Tate (disambiguation), multiple people
- Homer Tate (1884–1975), American sculptor
- Horace Tate (1922–2002), American educator
- Horacena Tate (born 1956), American politician
- Howard Tate (1939–2011), American singer
- Hughie Tate (1880–1956), American baseball player

=== I ===
- Ike Tate (1906–1986), English footballer
- Isobel Addey Tate (1875–1917), Irish doctor

=== J ===
- Jack Tate (disambiguation), multiple people
- Jackson Tate (1898–1978), American admiral
- Jae'Sean Tate (born 1995), American basketball player
- Jalen Tate (born 1998), American basketball player
- James Tate (disambiguation), multiple people
- Janet Tate, South African and American physicist
- Jaylon Tate (born 1995), American basketball player
- Jeff Tate (disambiguation), multiple people
- Jeffrey Tate (1943–2017), English conductor
- Jennifer Tate (born 1985), American mixed martial artist
- Jenny Tate (born 1960), Australian swimmer
- Jerod Impichchaachaaha' Tate (born 1968), American composer
- J. Henry Tate (1830–1918), American politician
- Jimmy Tate (1912–1984), Australian rules footballer
- Joan Tate (1922–2000), English translator
- John Tate (disambiguation), multiple people
- Joseph Tate (disambiguation), multiple people
- Juanita Tate (1938–2004), American activist
- Juanita Ollie Diffay Tate (1904–1988), American economist
- J. Waddy Tate (1870–1938), American politician

=== K ===
- Katherine Tate (born 1962), American political scientist
- Keith Tate (1945–2019), English boxer
- Kellyn Tate (born 1975), American softball player
- Kenny Tate (born 1990), American football player
- Kent Tate, Canadian filmmaker
- Kevin Tate (1943–2018), New Zealand chemist
- Khalil Tate (born 1998), American football player
- Knol Tate American musician
- Kristin Tate, American political commentator

=== L ===
- Larenz Tate (born 1975), American actor
- Lars Tate (1966–2022), American football player
- Lee Tate (born 1932), American baseball player
- Lincoln Tate (1934–2001), American actor
- Lionel Tate (born 1987), American convicted murderer
- Louise Tate (born 1965), English swimmer

=== M ===
- Magnus Tate (1767–1823), American lawyer and politician
- Marcia Tate (born 1961), Jamaican sprinter
- Mary Lee Tate (1893–1939), African American painter
- Mary Magdalena Lewis Tate (1871–1930), American evangelist
- Matthew Tate (1837–??), English poet
- Maurice Tate (1895–1956), English cricketer
- Mavis Tate (1893–1947), British politician
- Merze Tate (1905–1996), American professor
- Michael Tate (born 1945), Australian politician
- Mike Tate (born 1995), Canadian runner
- Miesha Tate (born 1986), American mixed martial artist
- Minnie Tate (1857–1899), American singer
- Monk Tate (1934–2020), American racing driver

=== N ===
- Nahum Tate (1652–1715), Irish poet
- Nancy Tate, American politician
- Nate Tate (born 1979), American politician
- Ned Tate (1901–1985), English footballer
- Nick Tate (born 1942), Australian actor
- Nikki Tate, Canadian author
- Norman Tate (born 1942), American long and triple jumper
- Norman Tate (entertainer) (1890–1962), New Zealand entertainer

=== P ===
- Pamela Tate, New Zealand judge
- Parr Tate (1901–1985), Irish parasitologist
- Penfield Tate (1931–1993), American politician
- Penfield Tate III (born 1956), American politician
- Pepsi Tate (1965–2007), Welsh guitarist
- Phil Tate (1922–2005), English dancer
- Phyllis Tate (1911–1987), English composer
- Pop Tate (baseball) (1860–1932), American baseball player

=== R ===
- Rachael Tate, British sound editor
- Ralph Tate (1840–1901), British botanist
- Randy Tate (born 1965), American politician
- Randy Tate (baseball) (1952–2021), American baseball player
- Raphael Tate (born 1984), American singer-songwriter
- Reginald Tate (1896–1955), British actor
- Reginald Tate (politician) (1954–2019), American politician
- Robert Tate (disambiguation), multiple people
- Rodney Tate (born 1959), American football player
- Roosevelt Tate (1911–1968), American baseball player

=== S ===
- Samuel McDowell Tate (1830–1897), Confederate colonel and American businessman
- Saxon Tate (1931–2012), English businessman
- Sharon Tate (1943–1969), American actress
- Sheila Tate, American secretary
- Shirley Anne Tate (born 1956), Jamaican sociologist
- Skatemaster Tate (1959–2015), American musician
- Sonja Tate (born 1971), American basketball player
- Stanley G. Tate (born 1928), American real estate developer
- Stephen Tate, British actor
- Stu Tate (born 1962), American baseball player
- Syd Tate (1925–2015), Australian rules footballer

=== T ===
- Tanya Tate (born 1979), English model
- Tavaris Tate (born 1990), American sprinter
- Terry Tate (born 1943), Australian rules footballer
- Thomas Tate (disambiguation), multiple people
- Tim Tate (artist) (born 1960), American glass sculptor
- Tim Tate (author) (born 1956), Indian-born British author, filmmaker and investigative journalist
- Tommy Tate (born 1956), American football coach
- Tommy Tate (musician) (1945–2017), American singer-songwriter
- Troy Tate, English musician
- Tristan Tate (born 1988), British-American Internet personality

=== W ===
- Walter Tate (1863–1946), English cricketer
- Warren Tate, New Zealand biochemist
- Will Tate (born 2001), English rugby league footballer
- William Tate (disambiguation), multiple people
- Willis M. Tate (1912–1989), American academic administrator
- Willy Tate (born 1972), American football player

=== Z ===
- Zouch Tate (1606–1650), English politician

== Fictional characters ==
- Carla Tate, a character on the movie The Other Sister
- Chris Tate, a character on the soap opera Emmerdale
- Heck Tate, a character in the book To Kill a Mockingbird
- Kim Tate, a character in the soap opera Emmerdale
- Schuyler Tate, a character in Power Rangers S.P.D.
- Zoe Tate, a character on the soap opera Emmerdale

== See also ==
- Tata (disambiguation), a disambiguation page for "Tata"
- Tate, a disambiguation page for "Tate"
- Tate (given name), a page for people with the given name "Tate"
- Tait (surname), a page for people with the surname "Tait"
- Tait (disambiguation), a disambiguation page for "Tait"
- Senator Tate (disambiguation), a disambiguation page for Senators surnamed "Tate"
