= Tatham =

Tatham is an English surname, and a place name. It may refer to:

== People ==
- Tatham family, the first residents of Hipping Hall
- Agnes Clara Tatham (1893–1972), English artist
- Alisha Tatham (born 1986), Canadian basketball player
- Arthur Tatham (1808–1874), English rector, son of Charles Heathcote Tatham
- Charles Tatham (disambiguation), several people
- David Tatham (born 1939), British ambassador, governor of the Falkland Islands, and biographer
- Edward Tatham (1749–1834), English academician, clergyman and controversialist
- Emma Tatham (1829–1855), British poet
- Frederick Tatham (1805–1878), British artist, son of Charles Heathcote Tatham
- John Tatham (fl. 1632–1664), English dramatist
- Julie Campbell Tatham (1908–1999), US writer, mostly of children's novels
- Nick Tatham (born 1983), British singer-songwriter
- Michael Tatham (born 1965), British ambassador
- Ralph Tatham (bap. 1778–1857), English academic and churchman
- Reidun Tatham (born 1978), Canadian synchronised swimmer
- Simon Tatham (born 1977), English software programmer
- Tamara Tatham (born 1985), Canadian basketball player
- Willie Tatham (fl. late 19th century), English footballer

== Places ==
- Tatham, Lancashire, a civil parish in Lancashire, England
- Tatham, New South Wales, a locality in Richmond Valley, Australia

== See also ==
- Captain Tatham of Tatham Island, a 1909 adventure novel by the British writer Edgar Wallace
- Tatum (disambiguation)
