= Taitt =

Taitt is the surname of

- Branford Taitt (1938 – 2013), Barbadian politician
- Charlene Taitt (born 1984), Barbadian cricketer
- Doug Taitt (1902 – 1970), Major League Baseball player
- Francis M. Taitt (1862 – 1943), bishop of the Episcopal Diocese of Pennsylvania
- Laurie Taitt (1934 – 2006), British hurdler
- Lynn Taitt (1934 – 2010), Trinidad and Tobago reggae guitarist
- Monique Taitt, Barbadian politician

See also

- Tait (disambiguation)
- Tate (disambiguation)
