= Tatum (surname) =

Tatum is an English toponymic surname. It derived from Tatham, a parish in North Lancashire. Notable people with the surname include:

- Art Tatum (1909–1956), American jazz pianist
- Beverly Daniel Tatum (born 1954), American university president
- Bradford Tatum (born 1965), American actor
- Channing Tatum (born 1980), American actor
- Charles "Chuck" Tatum (1926-2014), American World War II veteran
- Donn Tatum (1913–1993), American president of Walt Disney
- Edward Lawrie Tatum (1909–1975), American geneticist
- Hilt Tatum (1934–2025), American dentist
- Howell Tatum (died 1822), Justice of the Tennessee Supreme Court
- J. Michael Tatum, American voice actor
- Jack Tatum (1948–2010), American football player
- Jayson Tatum (born 1998), American basketball player
- Jim Tatum (1913–1959), American football and baseball coach
- Jim Tatum (born 1967), American baseball player
- John Tatum (disambiguation), multiple people
- Johnny Tatum (died 1994), American rodeo clown
- Kelvin Tatum (born 1964), Former British speedway rider
- Kinnon Tatum (born 1975), American football player
- Reece "Goose" Tatum (1921–1967), American basketball player
- Robert Tatum (1891–1964), American mountain climber
- Sandy Tatum (1920–2017), American lawyer and golf administrator

== See also ==
- Tatem (surname)
- Tate (surname)
