= Tatem =

Tatem may refer to:

- Tatem Elementary School, Collingswood, NJ
- Tatem Island, Bermuda
- For people surnamed Tatem, see Tatem (surname)
- Tatem, cloud-based task management and collaboration software
