= Tate (disambiguation) =

Tate is a group of public art galleries in the United Kingdom.

Tate may additionally refer to:

== Arts and entertainment ==
- Tate (TV series), an NBC western series
- Dede and Fred Tate, mother and son characters in Little Man Tate, a 1991 movie
- Tinnie Tate and other family members, characters in the Garrett P.I. fantasy novels
- The Airborne Toxic Event, an American rock band

== Businesses ==
- Tate Interactive, a video game developer
- Tate Publishing (disambiguation), one of several book publishers with the same name
- Tate's Bake Shop, a brand of cookies owned by Mondelez International

== Museums ==
- Tate Geological Museum, a museum at Casper College, Casper, Wyoming, US
- Tate Museum, usually referring to the Tate Gallery in London
- Tate Museum (Adelaide), a geological museum in Adelaide, Australia

== People ==
- Tate (surname), a list of people with the surname
- Tate (given name), a list of people with the given name or nickname
- Æthelburh of Kent (605 – c. 647), also known as Tate, Queen of Northumbria and Abbess of Lyminge
- Tate, codename of Wulf Schmidt (1911–1992), a double agent working for the British during the Second World War

== Places ==
=== Antarctica ===
- Tate Glacier, Ross Dependency
- Tate Rocks, Princess Elizabeth Land

=== Australia ===
- Mount Tate (New South Wales)
- Tate River, Queensland

=== Canada ===
- Tate, Saskatchewan, an unincorporated community
- Tate Island, an island in Saskatchewan

=== United States ===
- Tate, Georgia, United States, an unincorporated community
- Tate County, Mississippi
- Tate Township, Saline County, Illinois
- Tate Township, Clermont County, Ohio

=== Other places ===
- Tate, a term denoting a land division, equivalent in parts of Ireland to the modern term townland
- Mount Tate, Toyama Prefecture, Japan
- Táté, the Hungarian name for Totoi village, Sântimbru Commune, Alba County, Romania
- Tate District, Ica Province, Peru

== Other uses ==
- J. M. Tate High School, Cantonment, Florida, United States
- Tate (spirit), a wind spirit in Lakota mythology
- Tate baronets, a title in the Baronetage of the United Kingdom
- Tate Rink, a hockey rink in West Point, New York, United States
- USS Tate (AKA-70), a World War II attack cargo ship

== See also ==
- Tate's Cairn, a mountain in Hong Kong
- Tate Formation, a geologic formation in Kentucky, United States
