= Tatum (given name) =

Tatum is an English personal name of Old English origin, meaning "Tata's homestead". It is in use for both boys and girls.

== Women ==
- Tatum Grace Hopkins (born 2005), American actress
- Tatum Keshwar (born 1983), South African fashion model and Miss South Africa 2008
- Tatum Lee, American actress
- Tatum Lee-Hahn, American politician
- Tatum Lynn (born 2000), American singer-songwriter
- Tatum O'Neal (born 1963), American actress and author
- Tatum Paxley, ring name of American professional wrestler Natalie Beidelschies (born 1996)
- Tatum Stewart (born 2002), Australian field hockey player

== Men ==
- Tatum Bell (born 1981), American retired National Football League running back
- Tatum Bethune (born 2001), American college football player
- Tatum Greenblatt, Member group Mingus Big Band
- Tatum Gressette (1900–1997), American college football head coach at The Citadel

== Fictional characters ==
- Tatum Riley, a character in the 1996 film Scream

== See also ==
- Tatum (disambiguation)
