= Helen Klanderud =

American politician and social worker (1937–2013)

Mayor of Aspen, Colorado
- In office 2001 – June 2007
- Preceded by: Rachel Richards
- Succeeded by: Michael "Mick" Ireland

Personal details
- Born: June 9, 1937 Kansas City, Missouri
- Died: October 3, 2013 (aged 76) Denver, Colorado
- Party: Democratic Party

Helen Kalin Klanderud (June 9, 1937 – October 3, 2013) was an American politician, clinical social worker and attorney. In 1980, Klanderud was elected to the Pitkin County, Colorado, Board of County Commissioners, becoming the first woman to serve as a county commissioner. She later served as the Mayor of Aspen, Colorado, for three-consecutive terms from 2001 to 2007. As mayor, Klanderud was an active proponent of efforts to study and address climate change, initiatives for which the city received national and international recognition. A community service award has been created in her name as part of the Pitkin Country Cares Award program.

== Biography ==
=== Early life and career ===
Klanderud was born on June 9, 1937, in Kansas City, Missouri, in a home and shelter for single mothers. She was adopted by a family, who raised her in Lincoln, Nebraska. Her adopted father was a beer wholesaler, who often gave advice and counseling to his clients. Klanderud cited her parents as the reason she pursued a career as a clinical social worker and worked in community service. An admirer of President John F. Kennedy, she became involved with the Democratic Party during her 20s. She received a Bachelor of Arts degree from Saint Mary's College in Notre Dame, Indiana.

In 1971, she left her job with the Fort Logan Mental Health Center, and moved from Denver to Aspen, Colorado, with her four children shortly after a divorce from her husband. She lived to a home east of Aspen and raised her four children, Kurt, Erik, Kaela and Soren. She took a job with the Touchstone Mental Health Clinic, which had opened in 1969, and worked with the large number of hippies with drug and alcohol problems who were relocating to the Aspen area at the time. She later co-founded the Aspen Homeless Shelter and started Right Door, which provided substance abuse counseling.

She successfully campaigned on behalf of the Healthy Community Fund, a county-wide property tax to fund nonprofit and social service programs. Pitkin County voters approved the Healthy Community Fund in 2002 and renewed it in 2006 and 2011.

In 1976, Klanderud helped to create the Aspen Writers' Foundation (AWF) and served on its board of directors.

== Political career ==
Helen Klanderud began her political career during the summer of 1980. Klanderud was attending a Sunday concert at the Aspen Music Festival when she was approached by the then Aspen Mayor Herman Edel, who asked her to run for a new, open seat in the Board of County Commissioners of Pitkin County in the fall. The Board of County Commissioners was expanding from three seats to five members that year. Klanderud entered the race. She was won election to the board, defeating her opponent, Tom Isaac, by only 40 votes out of 5,126 total ballots cast in the race. In doing so, Klanderud became the first woman to be elected as a Pikin County commissioner once she took office in 1981. She was re-elected to a second term in 1984 and served until 1987. As a county commissioner, Klanderud, a smoker, opposed a city-wide no-smoking ordinance enacted by Aspen Mayor Bill Stirling during the 1980s. However, Klanderud and Mayor Stirling did collaborate on other issues affecting Aspen, such as the construction of a hydroelectric facility on Ruedi Reservoir. During the 1980s and 1990s, Klanderud also successfully promoted development of the Roaring Fork Transportation Authority, providing public transit to areas around Aspen. This work was later seen as a model by other communities along the Sea to Sky corridor.

In 1986, Klanderud ran for the Colorado State Senate, but lost the close election by approximately 500 votes. Klanderud completed the remainder of her term on the Pitkin Board of County Commissioners. She then returned to Nebraska, where she obtained a law degree from the University of Nebraska–Lincoln and cared for her mother. She moved back to Aspen after law school, where she opened the Alpine Legal Service, a nonprofit organization which provided legal advice to the poor.

=== Mayor of Aspen ===
Klanderud remained out of elected politics until 1999, when she challenged incumbent Aspen Mayor Rachel Richards in the mayoral election. Richards won the election over Klanderud by only 14 votes to win re-election.

Two years later, Mayor Rachel Richards sought re-election for another term in 2001. She was once again challenged by Klanderud in a rematch of the 1999 election. This time, Klanderud defeated Mayor Richards in Aspen's first ever mayoral runoff election held on June 5, 2001. Klanderud received 927 votes, while Richards received 878 votes. Though Richards and Klanderud were political rivals in two elections, the two became friends after meeting for wine at Syzygy Restaurant after one of their campaigns.

Klanderud was easily re-elected to a second term in 2003 and a third term in 2005 in landslide on both occasions. She served as mayor from 2001 to 2007 for three, two-year consecutive terms. She did not seek re-election in 2007 due to term limits and was succeeded by Mick Ireland, who had been an opponent of some of Aspen's infill policies.

==== Human services ====
As mayor, Klanderud championed the growth of human services in the city. She became the city's first mayor to attend monthly meetings held by the social services and nonprofit sectors. She supported policies which advocated infill to combat urban sprawl within the Aspen. Under these policies, Klanderud allowed for higher building densities and height limits within downtown and central Aspen, for which she received some opposition. By contrast, in September 2003, Klanderud came out in opposition to a proposed 330-unit affordable housing complex, which would have been built on Burlingame Ranch, citing environmental concerns. The development, which had been approved by voters in 2000, would have been the largest affordable housing complex ever constructed in Aspen. Klanderud had originally supported the proposal during her mayoral election campaign.

==== Climate change ====
External videos
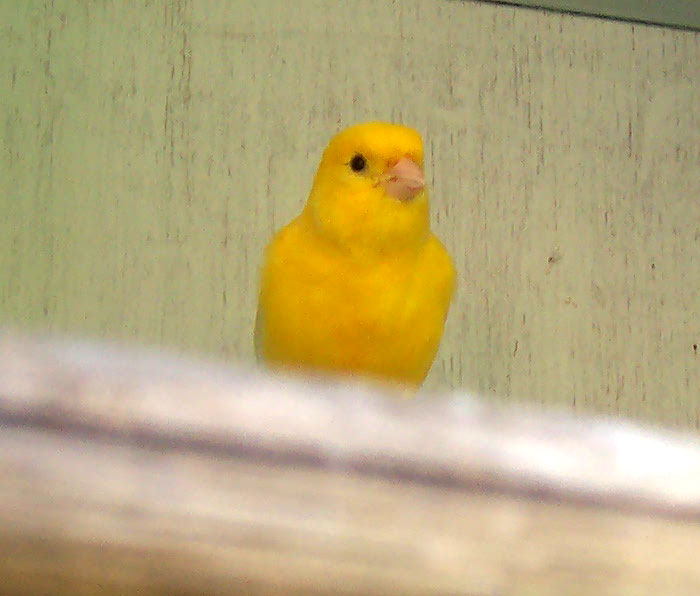
- Helen Klanderud, A Tale of One City: The Canary Initiative, Cities and Global Climate Change, University of California, Irvine

Klanderud was an active proponent of efforts to study and address climate change, because of its potential impact on towns like Aspen. "Global warming presents serious threats to our town's future. We are committed to being among the leaders in the global effort to respond to this challenge." In 2003, on behalf of the City of Aspen, she signed the U.S. Mayors' Statement on Global Warming. In 2004, the city supported the Declaration of Energy Independence. In 2005, Mayor Klanderud signed the U. S. Mayors Climate Protection Agreement. In 2005, the City of Aspen also joined the Chicago Climate Exchange and made a legally-binding commitment to reduce its GHGs (government operations only) by 1% per year. By the end of 2006, the city had reduced its emissions by 11.5% below 2005 levels. For "addressing climate change by committing to a clean energy future", the World Wildlife Fund awarded Aspen the 2005 Power Switch! Pioneer award.

In June 2005, Klanderud represented Aspen at the "Sundance Summit: A Mayors Gathering on Climate Protection," held in Salt Lake City, which examined ways that cities could cut and offset carbon emissions. Aspen was the smallest municipality to be invited to the three-day summit, which included major U.S. cities like Seattle and Chicago. Three Colorado mayors were invited to the Sundance Summit on Climate Protection, including Klanderud, Denver Mayor John Hickenlooper, and Boulder Mayor Mark Ruzzin. Later that same month, Mayor Klanderud and other Aspen officials announced the "Canary Initiative" to combat climate change and measure the town's emissions. At the time, Klanderud announced a focus on improvements to Aspen's transportation sector and energy-efficient building codes. Klanderud also presented at a national meeting, "Strengthening Our Cities: Mayors Responding to Global Climate Change", September 16–18, 2006, in Anchorage, Alaska. Emphasizing the importance of local and individual action, she said of the Alaska meeting, "It's about mayors taking leadership because of the failure of the federal government to join the Kyoto Protocol." She also served on the Climate Action Panel for the Colorado Climate Project. On behalf of the city of Aspen, Mayor Klanderud accepted the United States Environmental Protection Agency's Environmental Achievement Award, in 2007.

== Later life ==
Kaluderud had automatically become a member of the Aspen Chamber Resort Association board of directors as mayor. She continued to serve on the Aspen Chamber Resort Association as an elected member after leaving office, and was later appointed to its executive committee.

Klanderud suffered a stroke in a doctor's office in Aspen on the morning of October 2, 2013. She was airlifted to Swedish Medical Center in Denver, Colorado, where she died at 5 p.m. on October 3, 2013. She was survived by three of her four children - Kurt Klanderud, Erik Klanderud and Kaela Moontree.

A community service award has been created in her name as part of the Pitkin Country Cares Award program.
