= John Tatum =

John Tatum may refer to:

- John Tatum (scientist) (1772–1858), British silversmith, scientist and philosopher
- John Tatum (wrestler) (born 1959), American professional wrestler
- John Tatum (Canadian football) (born c. 1935), Canadian football player
- Johnny Tatum (died 1992), American rodeo clown and bullfighter
- Jack Tatum (1948–2010), American football player
