= Rosemary Marshall =

American politician

Member of the Colorado House of Representatives from the 8th district
- In office January 10, 2001 – January 14, 2009
- Preceded by: Penfield Tate III
- Succeeded by: Beth McCann

Personal details
- Born: April 20, 1942 (age 84)
- Party: Democratic

Rosemary Marshall (born April 20, 1942) is an American politician who served in the Colorado House of Representatives from the 8th district from 2001 to 2009.
