= Tatum =

Tatum may refer to:

== Places ==
=== United States ===
- Tatum, Georgia, a ghost town
- Tatum, New Mexico, a town
- Tatum, South Carolina, a town
- Tatum, Texas, a city
- Mount Tatum, Alaska

=== Elsewhere ===
- Tatum, Cameroon, a village
- 3748 Tatum, an asteroid

== People and fictional characters ==
- Tatum (given name), including a list of people and a fictional character
- Tatum (surname), including a list of people

== Other uses ==
- Tatum (music), a subdivision of a beat in music information retrieval
- Tatum, a brand name of the SFN Group, a temporary work agency
- USS Tatum (DE-789), a destroyer escort that served in World War II

== See also ==
- Tatham (disambiguation)
