= List of mayors of Boulder, Colorado =

The following is a list of mayors of the city of Boulder, Colorado, United States.

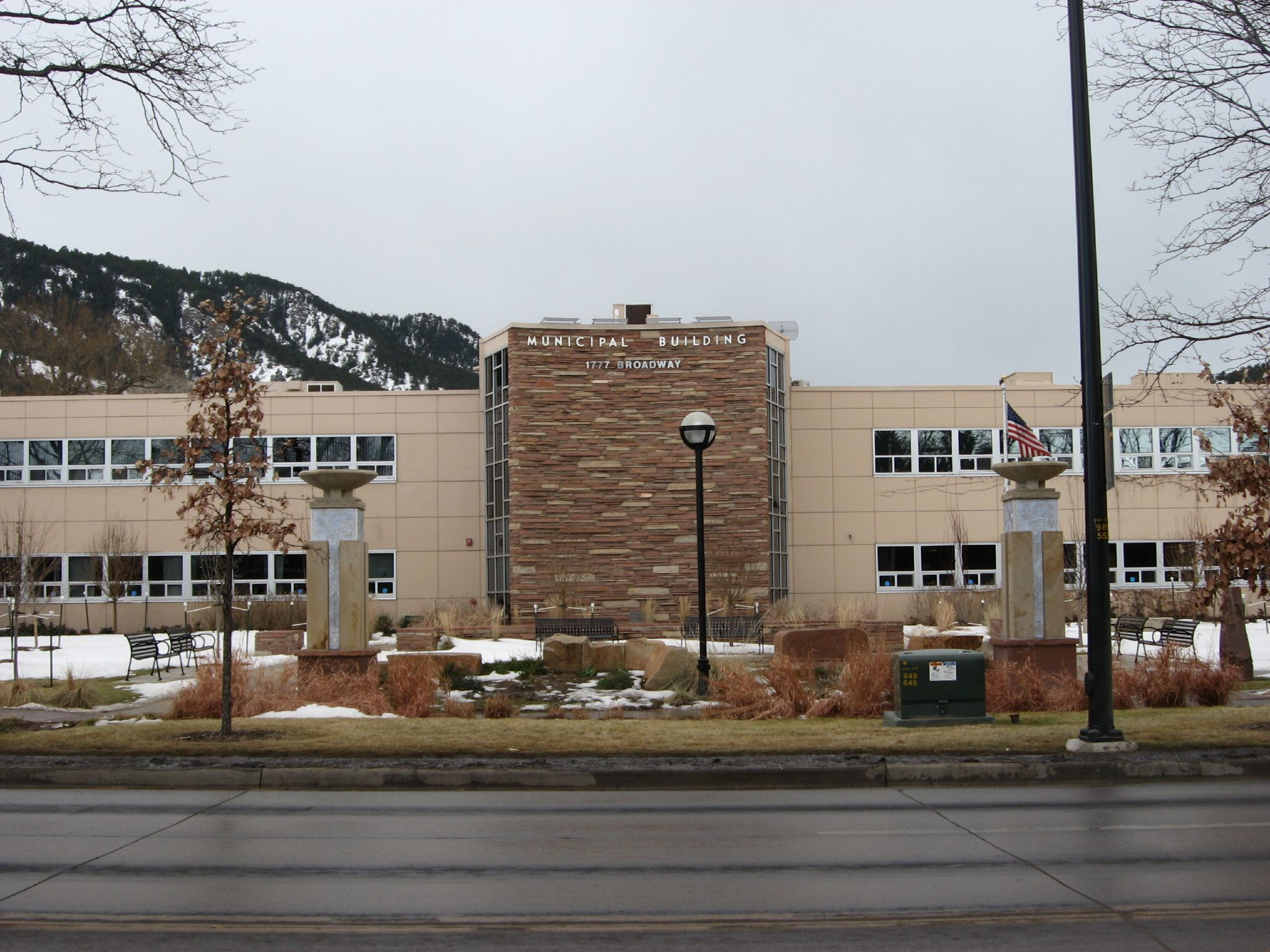
Municipal building on Broadway in Boulder, 2008

- Frederick A. Squires, 1871–1872
- Jarvis Gilbert, 1872–1873
- Ephriam Pound, 1873–1876
- John A. Ellett, 1876
- Nelson K. Smith, 1877–1878
- Jacob Ellison, 1878
- James P. Maxwell, 1878–1879
- Charles G. Van Fleet, 1879–1880
- John A. Ellett, 1880–1881
- Charles Dabney, 1881–1882
- John A. Ellett, 1882–1883
- William H. Allison, 1883
- Alpheus Wright, 1883–1885
- Charles C. Brace, 1885–1887
- Eugene A. Austin, 1887–1891
- Isaac Lamb Bond, 1891–1893
- James Cowie, 1893–1895
- Crockett Ricketts, 1895–1899
- Montford G. Whiteley, 1899–1905
- Lou R. Johnston, 1905–1907
- Isaac T. Earl, 1907–1909
- Alfred A. Greenman, 1909–1911
- Edward D. Webb, 1911–1913
- William L. Armstrong, 1913–1917
- Frederick J. Klingler, 1917
- Fred C. Moys, 1918–1920
- James O. Billig, 1920–1928
- Loren W. Cumberford, 1928–1932
- Howard Hull Heuston, 1932–1940
- Frank W. Thurman, 1940–1948
- J. Perry Bartlett, 1948–1952
- John D. Gillaspie, 1952–1956
- Leo C. Riethmayer, 1956–1960
- James O. Hickman, 1960–1962
- John P. Holloway, 1962–1964
- Paul H. Crouch, 1964–1966
- Robert W. Knecht, 1966–1971
- John C. Buechner, 1971–1972
- Richard C. McLean, 1972–1974
- Penfield Tate, 1974–1976
- Frank A. Buchanan, 1976–1978
- Ruth Correll, 1978–1986
- Linda S. Jourgensen, 1986–1990
- Leslie L. Durgin, 1990–1997
- Bob Greenlee, 1997–1999
- Will R. Toor, 1999–2004
- Mark Ruzzin, 2004–2007
- Shaun McGrath, 2007–2009
- Matthew Appelbaum, 2009
- Susan Osborne, 2009–2011
- Matthew Appelbaum, 2011–2015
- Suzanne Jones, ca.2015
- Aaron Brockett, 2023–2026

== See also ==
- Boulder history
