= Beth McCann =

American lawyer and politician from Colorado

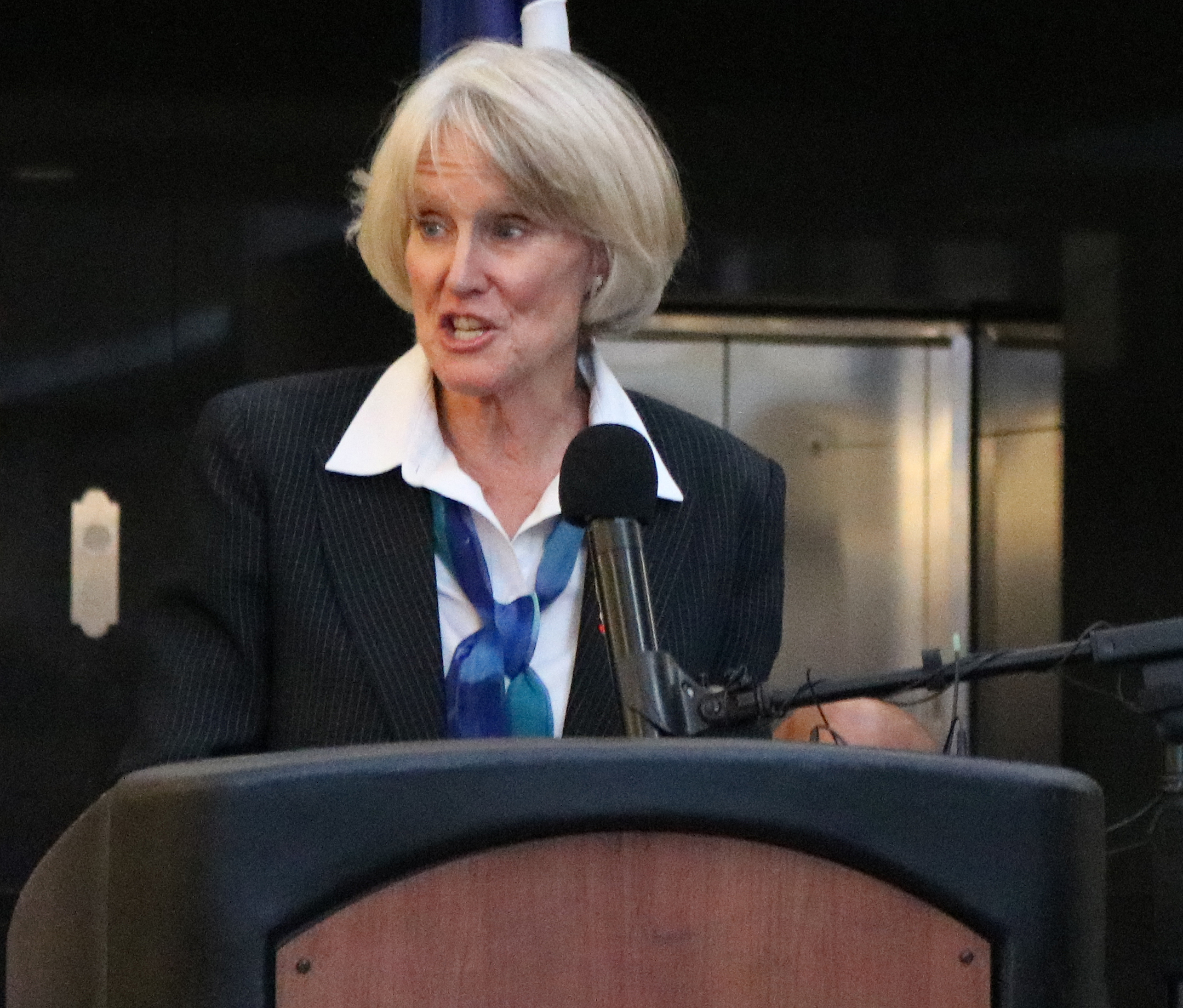
- Beth McCann in 2017.

District Attorney for Colorado's Second Judicial District
- In office January 10, 2017 – January 14, 2025
- Preceded by: Mitchell R. Morrissey
- Succeeded by: John F. Walsh

Member of the Colorado House of Representatives from the 8th district
- In office January 7, 2009 – January 10, 2017
- Preceded by: Rosemary Marshall
- Succeeded by: Leslie Herod

Personal details
- Born: February 10, 1949 (age 77) Radford, Virginia
- Party: Democratic
- Spouse: Christopher Linsmayer
- Children: 2
- Education: Georgetown University Law Center; Wittenberg University
- Occupation: Attorney, politician
- Website: Official website

Beth McCann (born February 10, 1949) is an American politician who served as Denver District Attorney from 2017 to 2025. She was the first woman to hold the office. A Democrat, McCann beat her opponent, independent Helen Morgan, winning 74% of the vote in the November, 2016 general election. Before serving as Denver's DA, McCann served from 2008 to 2017 as a Colorado State Representative, representing House District 8, which encompasses portions of central Denver, Colorado.

== Legislative career ==
=== 2008 election ===
Beth McCann defeated Matt Bergles and Cindy Lowery in the contested Democratic primary in August, taking 49 percent of votes cast. McCann faced no opposition in the November 2008 general election. Her candidacy was endorsed by the Denver Post.

=== 2009 legislative session ===
For the 2009 legislative session, McCann was named to seats on the House Appropriations Committee, the House State, Veterans, and Military Affairs Committee, and was tapped to be vice-chair of the House Judiciary Committee. McCann sponsored legislation to limit the number of dogs owned by commercial dog breeders to 25 and to require annual veterinary exams for breeding dogs.

=== 2012 election ===
In the 2012 General Election, Representative McCann faced Republican challenger Alan Johnson. McCann was elected by a wide margin of 83% to 13%.
