= Joseph Tait (disambiguation) =

Joseph Tait was a Canadian politician.

Joseph Tait may also refer to:

- Joe Tait (born 1937), American sports broadcaster
- Joe Tait (footballer) (born 1990), English footballer

== See also ==
- Joseph Tate (disambiguation)
