= Lindsay Gilchrist =

American politician

Member of the Colorado House of Representatives from the 8th district
- Incumbent
- Assumed office January 8, 2025
- Preceded by: Leslie Herod

Personal details
- Party: Democratic

Lindsay Gilchrist is an American politician. She has served as a member of the Colorado House of Representatives since January 2025, representing the 8th district. She is a member of the Democratic Party.
