= 2003 Denver mayoral election =

- May 6 and June 3, 2003
- Turnout: 46.45% (first round) and 44.59% (runoff)
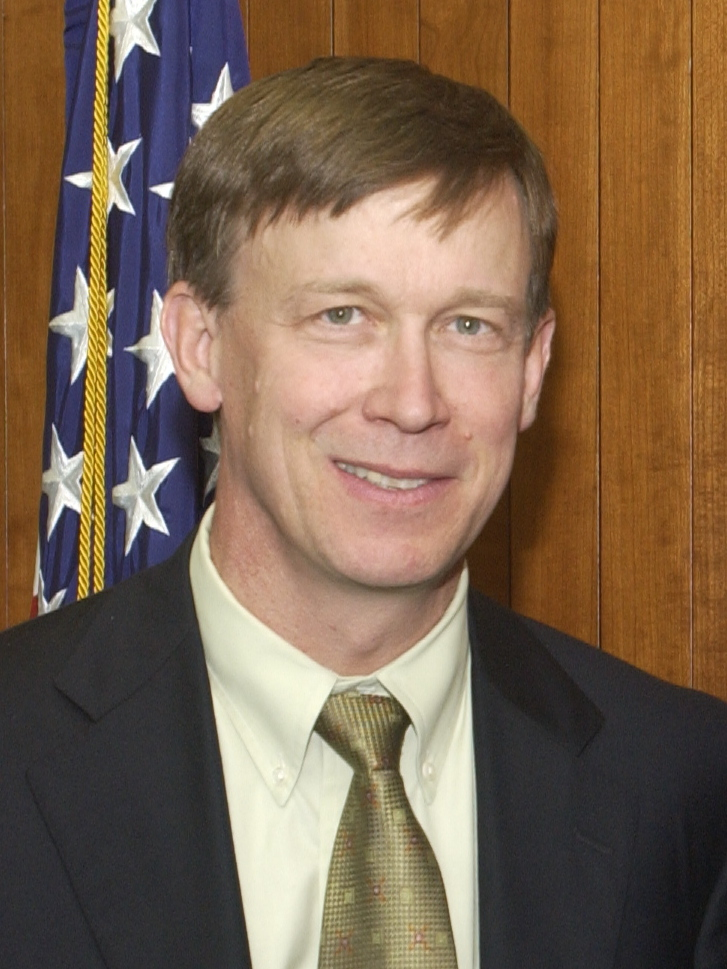

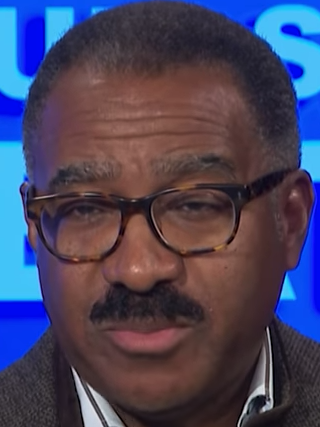

Nominee	John Hickenlooper	Donald Mares	Aristedes Zavaras
Party	Nonpartisan	Nonpartisan	Nonpartisan
First-round vote	49,185	25,308	14,145
First-round percentage	43.33%	22.29%	12.46%
Second-round vote	69,526	38,126
Second-round percentage	64.58%	35.42%
Nominee	Penfield Tate III	Susan Casey
Party	Nonpartisan	Nonpartisan
First-round vote	13,450	8,162
First-round percentage	11.85%	7.19%
Mayor before election
Wellington Webb
Democratic
Elected mayor
John Hickenlooper
Democratic

The 2003 Denver mayoral election was held on May 6 and June 3, 2003.

== Candidates ==
- Susan Casey, City Councilmember
- John Hickenlooper
- Donald J. Mares, City Auditor
- Phil Perington
- Elizabeth Schlosser
- Penfield Tate III, State Senator
- Aristedes 'Ari' Zavaras

== Polling ==
Poll source	Date(s) administered	Sample size (Note: Key: A – all adults RV – registered voters LV – likely voters CV – certain voters V – unclear)	Margin of error	John Hickenlooper (D)	Donald Mares (D)	Other / Undecided
SurveyUSA	May 29 – June 1, 2003	523 (CV)	± 4.3%	60%	37%	3%

== Results ==
Candidates	General Election		Run-off Election	
	Votes	%	Votes	%
John Hickenlooper	49,185	43.33	69,526	64.58
Donald J. Mares	25,308	22.29	38,126	35.42
Aristedes 'Ari' Zavaras	14,145	12.46		
Penfield Tate III	13,450	11.85		
Susan Casey	8,162	7.19		
Elizabeth Schlosser	1,812	1.60		
Phil Perington	1,247	1.10		
Write-in	211	0.19		
Total	113,520	100	107,652	100
