= Leslie Herod =

American politician from Colorado

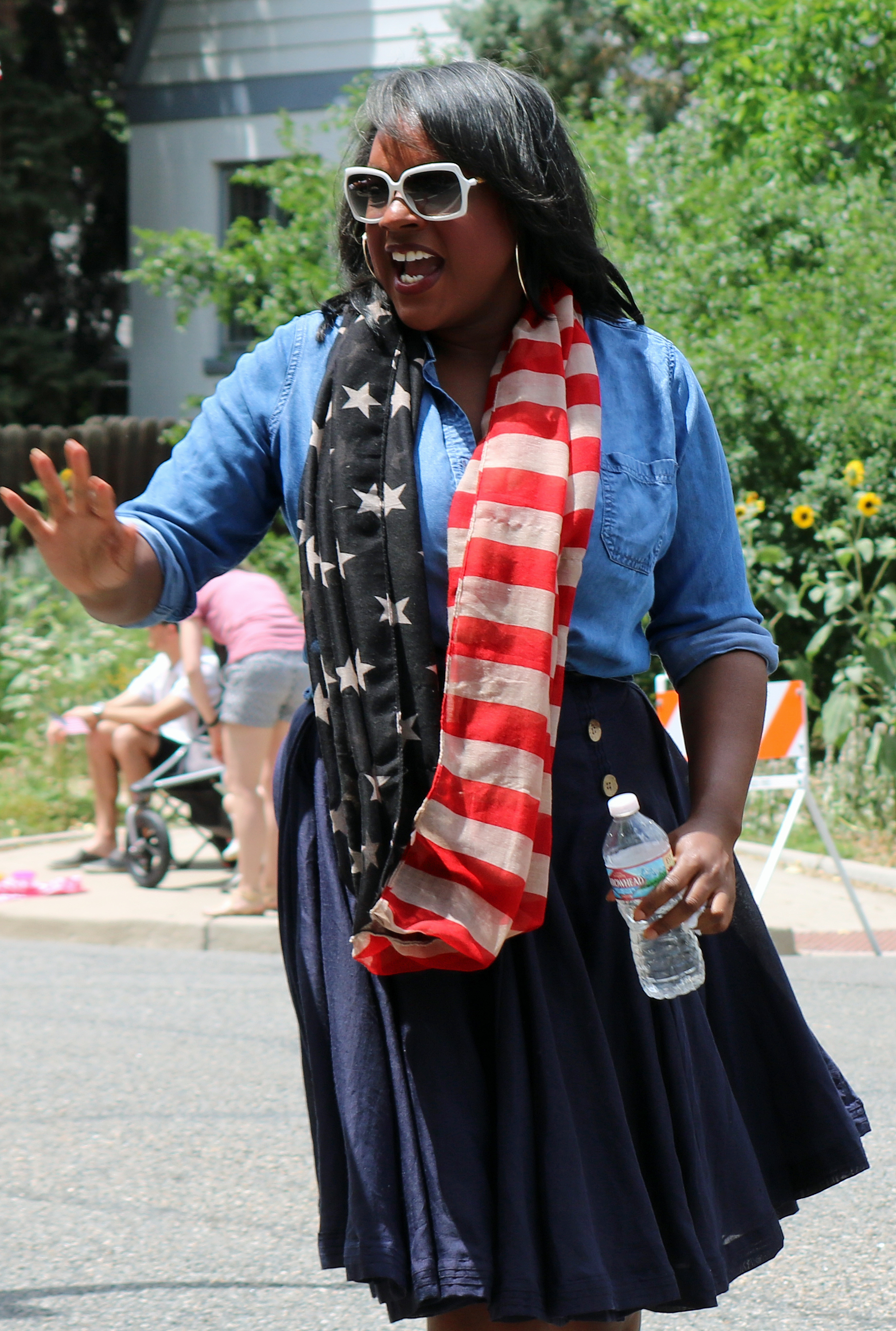
- Leslie Herod greeting voters watching the 2017 Park Hill Fourth of July parade

Member of the Colorado House of Representatives from the 8th district
- In office January 10, 2017 – January 8, 2025
- Preceded by: Beth McCann
- Succeeded by: Lindsay Gilchrist

Personal details
- Born: 1982 (age 43–44) Germany
- Party: Democratic
- Education: University of Colorado
- Occupation: Politician

Leslie Herod (born 1982) is an American politician who is a former member of the Colorado House of Representatives. A member of the Democratic Party, she represented the 8th district. She is the first LGBT African-American to be elected to Colorado's state legislature.

== Biography ==
Herod was born in 1982 on a United States military base in Germany. She moved around much of her early life, as her mother was an officer in the United States Army Nurse Corps. Herod attended high school in Colorado Springs, Colorado. She received her Bachelor of Arts from the University of Colorado Boulder. In 2017, Herod completed Harvard University's John F. Kennedy School of Government program for Senior Executives in State and Local Government as a David Bohnett LGBTQ Victory Institute Leadership Fellow.

== Political career ==
Herod defeated fellow Democrat Aaron Goldhamer in the Democratic primary for the 8th district seat for the Colorado House of Representatives. In the general election, she defeated Republican Evan Vanderpool, winning 84.81% of the vote. Herod backed Caring 4 Denver, a Denver mental and behavioral health tax.

Herod ran unopposed in both the Democratic primary and the general election in 2018 and 2020. Herod’s state House campaign went delinquent in filing her 2020 personal financial disclosures, accruing $15,200 in penalties, which the Colorado Secretary of State waived for $50

She ran for Mayor of Denver in 2023. She was publicly accused of workplace and sexual harassment during her campaign which she denied.

The election took place on April 4, 2023, with Herod placing fifth with 10.7% of the vote, therefore being eliminated in the first round of the election. In the runoff election, Herod endorsed former rival Mike Johnston. Candidate Kelly Brough, Johnston's opponent in the runoff, subsequently alleged that Herod had sought a guaranteed job in Brough's administration in exchange for endorsing her instead. Johnston claimed he made no such deal with Herod, though he did subsequently name her as Chair of his Inauguration Committee.

In 2023, amid a housing shortage in Denver, Herod opposed the redevelopment of a Denver golf course which a developer had purchased hoping to void the conservation easement that was on the property (the easement was voted on and passed by Denver residents decades earlier). The plan called for 2,500 homes (including affordable housing, as defined by the developer) and commercial space. There.was widespread opposition to this developer and development plan in the district. Herod said that she would rather see housing built somewhere else in Denver and the area remain open space. Another affordable housing project, supported by Herod and the neighborhood, just 10 blocks away is nearing completion as of November 2024.
