= John C. Buechner =

American educator and politician (1934–2018)

John Charles Buechner (July 30, 1934 – July 28, 2018) was an American educator and politician.

Buechner was born in Cleveland, Ohio. He moved with his family to Wooster, Ohio and graduated from Wooster High School. In 1956, Buechner received his bachelor's degree in political science from the College of Wooster. Buechner and his wife moved to Tallahassee, Florida where he taught at the Florida State University. Buechner received his master's degree in public administration from the University of Michigan, in 1958, and then received his doctorate degree in political science, in 1963, from the University of Michigan. In 1963, Buechner, his wife, and family moved to Boulder, Colorado where he taught political science at University of Colorado Boulder. Buechner served on the Boulder City Council from 1967 to 1971. He also served as Mayor of Boulder in 1971 and 1972. Buechner served in the Colorado House of Representatives in 1973 and 1974 and was a Republican. Buechner and his wife moved to Lafayette, Colorado. Buechner then served of the Lafayette City Council in 2010. In 1995, Buechner served as chancellor of the University of Colorado Denver campus. From 1995 to 2000, Buechner served as the 18th president of the University of Colorado system.

== See also ==
- List of mayors of Boulder, Colorado
