= Bob Greenlee =

American politician

Bob Greenlee (born July 6, 1941, in Omaha, Nebraska) is an American businessman, philanthropist, and former politician.the executive director of the Greenlee Family Foundation.

Greenlee was educated at Iowa State University where he received his B.A. in 1963 and M.A. in 1968. Decades later, in 1997, Iowa State initiated the Greenlee School of Journalism and Mass Communication in response to a large donation.

After a career in advertising, Bob, with wife Diane, moved to Boulder, Colorado in 1975 and bought radio station KADE. In 1978, the Greenlees launched and developed the very successful KBCO, an FM station programming adult album alternative (AAA) format, which they sold in 1988 for $27M to Noble Broadcasting, now part of the iHeartRadio conglomerate. Greenlee also co-founded what would become CraftWorks Restaurants & Breweries, of which he is still a board member. He is president of Centennial Investment & Management Company, Inc., a Boulder-based venture capital and real estate firm.

Greenlee was the Republican mayor of Boulder from 1998 to 1999 and city council member from 1983-1999. In 1998, he ran a narrowly unsuccessfully race as a moderate pro-choice Republican against Mark Udall in 1998 for Colorado's 2nd Congressional District.

In late December 2016, Greenlee was seriously injured when he caused a highway accident in southern Colorado involving 5 vehicles. Another driver was killed and two other people were injured. Greenlee was driving the SUV at 89 MPH that apparently started the chain reaction.

Greenlee and his wife, Diane, have two children.

== 2016 car accident ==
On Wednesday, December 28, 2016, Bob Greenlee and his wife were driving on U.S. 160 westbound across La Veta Pass between Walsenburg and Alamosa in their 2003 Cadillac Escalade. A high-speed (89 MPH) unsafe passing maneuver by Greenlee set off a chain reaction involving several passenger cars and a tractor trailer truck, resulting in one fatality, two serious injuries and five less-serious injuries. Everyone involved was wearing a seat belt and no one was ejected from a vehicle.

Pat (Patricia) Lucero, 70, from Monte Vista died instantly after the Toyota Camry she was driving was struck by Greenlee's vehicle, once she was already dead, the Camry hit a tractor trailer, then struck a Kia Spectra. The Greenlees' SUV also struck a BMW X5 head on, causing it to roll and land on its side. Both Greenlee and his wife suffered critical injuries and were hospitalized in two different facilities. In all, seven people were transported, by ground ambulance, to three different hospitals. The highway was closed for a few hours. Initial reports indicated speed was a contributing factor.

Six weeks after the accident, a meeting between state patrol investigators and the District Attorney's office was being rescheduled and no charges had been filed.

A week later, the news turned to aggressive driving and speed, as investigators reported Greenlee was "passing improperly" at 22 mph over the speed limit: 87 mph in a 65 mph zone.

On Wednesday, Feb. 22, nine criminal charges were filed against Greenlee: two homicide charges - vehicular, criminally negligent - as well as vehicular assault, two counts of careless driving causing injury, reckless driving, speeding, reckless endangerment and improper passing on the left.

Greenlee's court arraignment was set for Tuesday, Mar. 28 in Alamosa. The most serious of the nine charges - vehicular homicide, a Class 4 felony - could lead to a prison sentence of two to six years.

In January 2018, Greenlee pleaded guilty to criminally negligent homicide and three other charges, with potential prison time of up 3 years.

In late March 2018, Greenlee was sentenced in Costilla District Court to a year of home detention, a $100,000 fine, an annual charitable contribution of $100,000 for the ten-year probation term, and 200 hours of community service. Although the judge called Greenlee's role in the fatal accident "egregious… inexplicable conduct… inexcusable behavior", he felt that incarceration would essentially be a death sentence and would serve no purpose, and that the $1 million in charitable funds, to an entity selected by the prosecutor, would help the San Luis Valley community. Greenlee later appealed the sentence.

== Greenlee Family Foundation ==
The Greenlee Family Foundation is a "private grant-making organization." Its mission is: "to encourage, preserve and promote the well-being, education, welfare and enlightenment of our fellow citizens by investing in creative people and ideas."

== See also ==
- List of people from Colorado
- List of mayors of Boulder, Colorado
