= James Tate =

James Tate may refer to:

- James Tate (headmaster) (1771–1843), headmaster of Richmond School, 1796–1833
- James Tate (politician) (1910–1983), Irish-American politician, mayor of Philadelphia
- Honest Dick Tate (James William Tate, 1831–?), state treasurer of Kentucky
- James W. Tate (1875–1922), songwriter, accompanist, and composer
- James Tate (writer) (1943–2015), American poet
- Jimmy Tate (1912–1984), Australian rules footballer
- James Tate, murderer involved in the 2003 John McDonogh High School shooting
- James Tate (Emmerdale), a fictional character on the soap opera Emmerdale

== See also ==
- Jim Tait (c. 1935–2011), football coach
