= Frank Aplin =

New Zealand police officer (1901–1965)

Francis Norman Aplin QPM (17 September 1901 – 18 February 1965) was a New Zealand police officer. He was born in Crofton, Wellington, New Zealand, on 17 September 1901.

In the 1959 Queen's Birthday Honours, Aplin was awarded the Queen's Police Medal for distinguished service.
