= Monk Tate =

American racing driver (1934–2020)

- Born: John Dillard Tate; March 29, 1934; Ruffin, North Carolina
- Died: May 15, 2020 (aged 86); Ruffin, North Carolina
- Achievements: 1971 Trico Motor Speedway late model sportsman champion

NASCAR O'Reilly Auto Parts Series career
- 1 race run over 1 year
- 1982 position: 173rd
- Best finish: 173rd (1982)
- First race: 1982 Dogwood 500 (Martinsville)
Wins	Top tens	Poles
0	0	0
- Statistics up to date as of October 2, 2020.

John Dillard "Monk" Tate (March 29, 1934 – May 15, 2020) was an American racing driver, moonshine runner, tobacco farmer and business owner. He was a competitor in the NASCAR Budweiser Late Model Sportsman Series, winning the 1975 Cardinal 500 at Martinsville Speedway.

== Racing career ==
After becoming a racing fan in his youth, Tate started his racing career with a 1938 Chevrolet, driving it at Rainbow Speedway in his late teens. He later raced locally at tracks like Concord International Speedway, Draper Speedway and Log Cabin Raceway. He later expanded to regional racing in the eastern United States, running races as far away as the World Series of Asphalt in Florida. Tate claimed a NASCAR Late Model Sportsman Division win at the Cardinal 500 at Martinsville Speedway in 1975, inheriting the lead late after Butch Lindley slowed from tire wear. After briefly retiring from competitive racing in the 1980s, Tate began vintage racing in 1996 and continued to do so until 2004. Bouncing between stock car racing, late model racing and modified racing, Tate estimated that he won over 1,000 races in his career, including 50 in one particularly successful season.

Tate also dabbled in car ownership, fielding a ride for Cale Yarborough in 1977 at Trico Motor Speedway. In the 2010s, Tate was a modified car owner at Ace Speedway.

== Personal life ==
Tate was nicknamed "Monk" after he climbed a falling tree in his childhood. He ran moonshine, leading police to trap him one time by blocking both ends of a bridge on the Dan River. The incident landed Tate one night in jail and a probationary period. Tate was a tobacco farmer in the beginning portions of his adult life and later owned Tate Trucking Company until 2019.

== Motorsports career results ==
=== NASCAR ===
==== Budweiser Late Model Sportsman Series ====
NASCAR Budweiser Late Model Sportsman Series results
Year	Car owner	No.	Make	1	2	3	4	5	6	7	8	9	10	11	12	13	14	15	16	17	18	19	20	21	22	23	24	25	26	27	28	29	NBLMSSC	Pts	Ref
1982	Monk Tate	88	Olds	DAY	RCH	BRI	MAR; 32	DAR	HCY	SBO	CRW	RCH	LGY	DOV	HCY	CLT	ASH	HCY	SBO	CAR	CRW	SBO	HCY	LGY	IRP	BRI	HCY	RCH	MAR	CLT	HCY	MAR	173rd	67	
