= Kenny Wiggins =

American football player (born 1988)

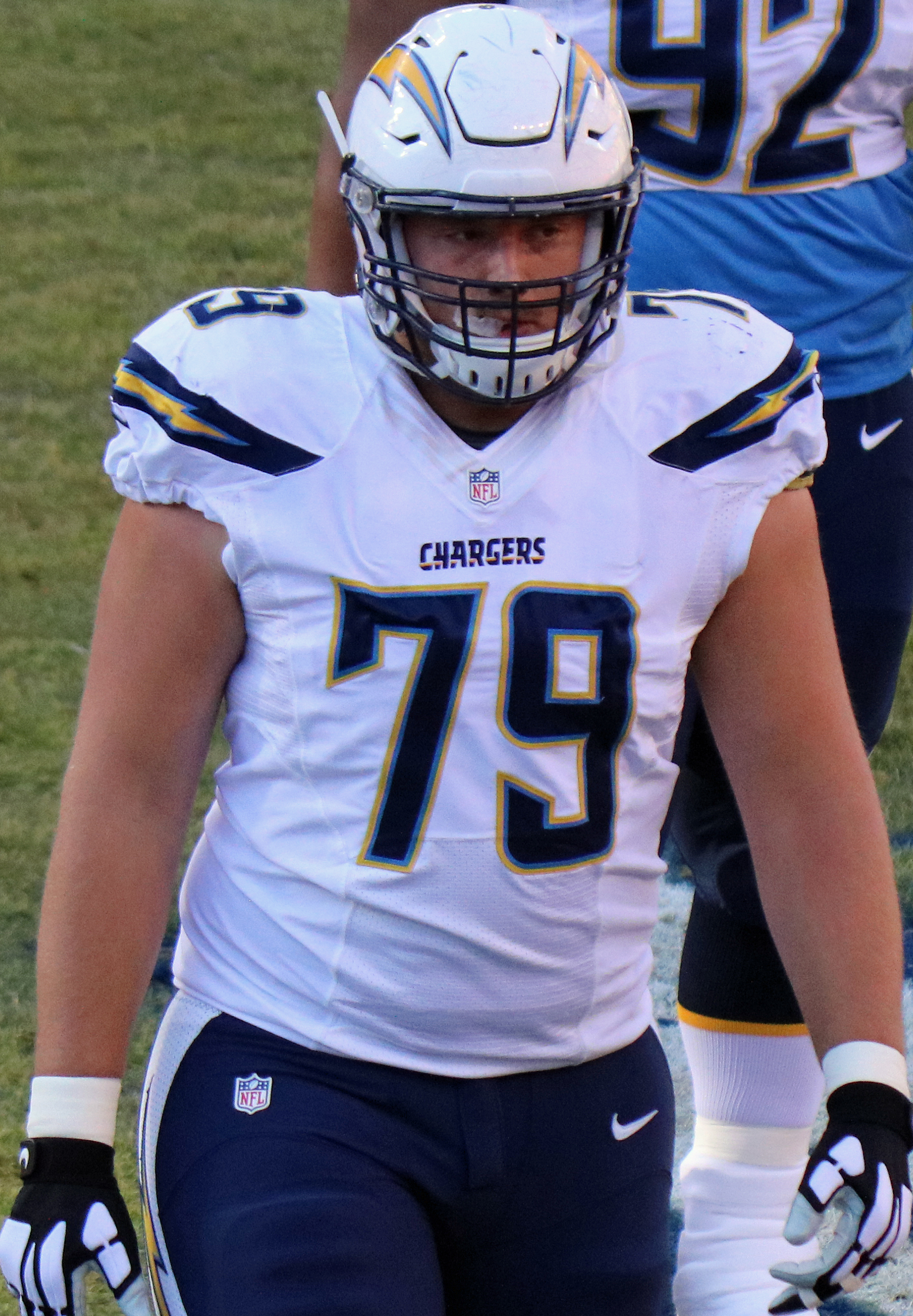
- Wiggins with the San Diego Chargers in 2015

No. 79
- Position: Guard

Personal information
- Born: August 8, 1988 (age 38); Elk Grove, California, U.S.
- Listed height: 6 ft 6 in (1.98 m)
- Listed weight: 315 lb (143 kg)

Career information
- High school: Elk Grove
- College: Fresno State (2006–2010)
- NFL draft: 2011: undrafted

Career history
- San Francisco 49ers (2011)*; Baltimore Ravens (2011)*; San Francisco 49ers (2012–2013)*; San Diego / Los Angeles Chargers (2013–2017); Detroit Lions (2018–2020); New York Giants (2020)
- * Offseason or practice squad member only

Career NFL statistics
- Games played: 79
- Games started: 38
- Stats at Pro Football Reference

Kenny Wiggins (born August 8, 1988) is an American former professional football player who was a guard in the National Football League (NFL). He was signed by the San Francisco 49ers as an undrafted free agent in 2011. He played college football for the Fresno State Bulldogs. Wiggins also played with the Baltimore Ravens and San Diego / Los Angeles Chargers.

== Early life ==
Wiggins was born and raised in Elk Grove, California. He graduated from Elk Grove High School.

== Professional career ==
=== Baltimore Ravens ===
Wiggins was signed to the Baltimore Ravens practice squad on Monday November 28, 2011.

=== San Francisco 49ers ===
Wiggins signed with the San Francisco 49ers on January 31, 2012. He was cut prior to the regular season on September 1, 2012.

Wiggins again signed with 49ers on February 7, 2013. He was released by the team on August 31, 2013.

=== San Diego / Los Angeles Chargers ===
On November 16, 2013, Wiggins was promoted to the Chargers' active roster. He was cut two days later to make room for Willie Smith. He was re-signed to the practice squad and once again promoted to the active roster on November 23, 2013. He was released on August 20, 2014, but was subsequently resigned to the team in September. On October 4, 2015, Wiggins got his first career start against the Cleveland Browns in for the injured Orlando Franklin.

On March 20, 2017, Wiggins re-signed with the Chargers. He started all 16 games at right guard for the Chargers in 2017.

=== Detroit Lions ===
On March 15, 2018, Wiggins signed with the Detroit Lions. He was named a backup guard to start the season, but was thrust into a starting role at right guard following an injury to T. J. Lang. He was officially named the starter in Week 10 for the rest of the season, starting in a total of 10 games.

In 2019, Wiggins played in 14 games, starting three at both guard spots, before being placed on injured reserve on December 16, 2019.

On April 16, 2020, Wiggins re-signed with the Lions. He was released on September 5, 2020 and signed to the practice squad the next day. He was elevated to the active roster on September 12 for the team's week 1 game against the Chicago Bears and reverted to the practice squad on September 14. He was promoted to the active roster on September 19, 2020. He was released on October 24.

=== New York Giants ===
On November 3, 2020, Wiggins was signed by the New York Giants. He was waived on November 13, 2020, and re-signed to the practice squad four days later. He signed a reserve/future contract on January 4, 2021.

On August 31, 2021, Wiggins was released by the Giants and re-signed to the practice squad the next day. He was released on September 7.
