= William Tait =

William Tait is the name of:

- William Auld Tait (1826–1900), Canadian pioneer and politician
- William W. Tait (1929–2024), professor of philosophy at the University of Chicago
- William Tait (cricketer), New Zealand cricketer
- William Tait (footballer), Association football player during the 1890s and 1900s.
- William Tait (publisher) (1793–1864), Scottish publisher best known for Tait's Magazine
- William Tait (MP) (died 1800), Member of Parliament for Stirling Burghs 1797–1800

== See also ==
- Willie Tait, British Royal Air Force officer
- William Tate (disambiguation)
