= Susan Osborne =

American politician

Susan Marguerite Osborne (born April 5, 1944) was the Democratic mayor of Boulder, Colorado from November 17, 2009, to November 8, 2011. She was city council member from November 6, 2007, to November 8, 2011, and before that served as director of long range planning, energy and environment director, Community Development Block Grant assistant director and director, and neighborhood and historic preservation planner for the city of Boulder from 1977 until her retirement in 1999.

Osborne was educated at Vassar College and University of Colorado at Boulder where she received an A.B. in sociology in 1974 and at University of Colorado at Denver where she received a M.A. in Urban and Regional Planning in 1977. After retiring, Osborne taught courses included History of City Planning, Housing Policy and Programs, Energy and Design, Behavior and Environment and several graduate and undergraduate studio classes at the University of Colorado. During this time, she also completed coursework and dissertation research for a doctorate in Design and Planning.

She is married to an attorney and has two children.

== Commemoration ==
A plaque in the sitting area along the Boulder Creek Path near 17th Street contains a dedication to Osborne for her years of work as a city planner. The plaque, which recognizes Osborne for her work to create the Boulder Creek Plan in 1985, is a reminder of her accomplishments as a city planner of 22 years, championing the greenways and bike paths.

== See also ==
- List of mayors of Boulder, Colorado
