= Matt Kopa =

American football player (born 1987)

No. 61, 68, 78
- Position: Offensive tackle

Personal information
- Born: February 25, 1987 (age 39); Sacramento, California, U.S.
- Listed height: 6 ft 6 in (1.98 m)
- Listed weight: 310 lb (141 kg)

Career information
- High school: Elk Grove (CA)
- College: Stanford
- NFL draft: 2010: undrafted

Career history
- San Francisco 49ers (2010)*; Miami Dolphins (2010–2011); New England Patriots (2011–2012)*; Philadelphia Eagles (2012)
- * Offseason or practice squad member only
- Stats at Pro Football Reference

Matthew Alexander Kopa (born February 25, 1987) is an American former professional football offensive tackle of the National Football League (NFL). He played college football for Stanford where he changed positions from defensive to offensive lineman in 2007. Kopa was signed in 2010 by the San Francisco 49ers as an undrafted free agent. On November 9, 2010, Kopa was signed by the Miami Dolphins off of the 49ers practice squad. He later played for the New England Patriots and the Philadelphia Eagles.

== Early life ==
Kopa earned many accolades as both an offensive and defensive lineman while attending Elk Grove High School in Elk Grove, California. Kopa burst on to the national spotlight during his junior year following his outstanding performance at the Palo Alto Nike Camp. In 2004, Kopa was ranked as the #82 player in the nation, and the #7 defensive end in the country according to Rivals.com. He played in the CaliFlorida Bowl at the Orange Bowl in Miami, Florida on January 2, 2005.

== College career ==
Kopa committed very early in the recruiting process to Stanford, and maintained his allegiance to the Cardinal following the firing of head coach Buddy Teevens. He began his career playing on the defensive line for head coach Walt Harris. After redshirting his freshman year, he won the battle for the starting defensive end position in 2006, but suffered a hyperextended elbow during the final week of training camp that marginalized his performance until the last month of the season. In 2007, Jim Harbaugh became the new head coach at Stanford, and asked Kopa to move over to the offensive line. As a Junior, Kopa played both as a reserve offensive tackle and tight end. Kopa eventually played in 35 career games with the Cardinal. He had seven starts including starting the final six games of the 2008 season, five at right tackle and one at left guard. Kopa was projected to have a breakout season in 2009 and be one of the top offensive tackles taken in the 2010 NFL draft. Unfortunately, he injured his foot while playing in the 2009 season opener against Washington State and missed the rest of the season after undergoing surgery at Stanford University Hospital. Kopa petitioned the NCAA to play a 6th year, but was denied. Kopa graduated in 2010 from Stanford University with a degree in mechanical engineering.

== Professional career ==
Kopa attended the NFL Scouting Combine in 2010, but was still rehabbing from foot surgery and did not participate in the on-field drills. He signed with the San Francisco 49ers as an undrafted free agent following the 2010 NFL draft on June 8, 2010. Kopa was released during final cuts, but was signed to the 49ers' practice squad on September 6, 2010, where he practiced for the first eight games of the season. He was signed by the Miami Dolphins as a free agent off the 49ers' practice squad on November 9, 2010.

On September 3, 2011, Kopa was cut by the Miami Dolphins as part of the final roster cutdowns. On September 5, 2011, Kopa was signed to the New England Patriots practice squad. On December 3, 2012, Kopa was signed to the Philadelphia Eagles' active roster off the Patriots' practice squad. Kopa injured his back during the 2013 preseason, and was later released by Eagles when they made their final roster cuts on August 30, 2013. Kopa subsequently had several epidural injections while undergoing physical therapy, but eventually had surgery at Stanford University Hospital to repair two ruptured disks as well as several bulging disks. Not wanting to risk further injury he opted to retire.
