= Harry Tate (disambiguation) =

Harry Tate was an English comedian.

Harry Tate may also refer to:

- Harry Tate (cricketer) (1862–1949), English cricketer
- Harry Tate (soccer) (1886–1954), American amateur football (soccer) player

== See also ==
- Harry Tait, character in Paradise Beach
- Harold Tate (disambiguation)
- Henry Tate (disambiguation)
