= Colorado's 8th House of Representatives district =

American legislative district

Colorado's 8th State House of Representatives district
Representative
Lindsay Gilchrist; D–Denver
- Demographics: 56% White; 14% Black; 20% Hispanic; 3% Asian; 0% Native American; 6% Multiracial
- Population (2021): 89,420

Colorado's 8th House of Representatives district is one of 65 districts in the Colorado House of Representatives. It has been represented by Democrat Lindsay Gilchrist since 2025.

== Geography ==
District 8 is located in central Denver.

== Members ==
- Penfield Tate III (until 2009)
- Rosemary Marshall (2001–2009)
- Beth McCann (2009–2017)
- Leslie Herod (2017–2025)
- Lindsay Gilchrist (since 2025)
