= David Tait (disambiguation) =

David Tait (1987–2012) was a British rugby union player.

David Tait may also refer to:

- David M. Tait (born 1947), British airline executive with Virgin Atlantic
- David Tait (footballer) in 1896–97 Manchester City F.C. season

== See also ==
- David Tate (disambiguation)
