= Elk Grove High School (Elk Grove, California) =

Location
- 9800 Elk Grove Florin Rd; Elk Grove, California 95624; 38.40103°N 121.37279°W

Information
- Type: Public
- Established: 1893
- School district: Elk Grove Unified School District
- Superintendent: Christopher Hoffman
- Principal: Rudy Ortega Jr.
- Teaching staff: 83.18 (on an FTE basis)
- Grades: 9-12
- Enrollment: 1,692 (2023–2024)
- Student to teacher ratio: 20.34
- Colors: Navy and gold
- Mascot: The Thundering Herd
- Website: eghs.egusd.net

Elk Grove High School is a public four-year high school located in Elk Grove, California, in the United States. It is part of the Elk Grove Unified School District and serves the southeast end of Elk Grove that is to the right of California State Route 99 and below Sheldon Road.

== History ==
Elk Grove Union High School was the first union high school in the state of California. Sixteen elementary districts voted to tax themselves for a high school, and they all remained as separate districts until the entire K–12 district unified in 1959. The high school opened its doors in 1893 at its first site on Main Street (now Derr Street and Elk Grove Boulevard in Old Town). In 1922, a new brick building was constructed on the corner of Elk Grove Boulevard and Elk Grove Florin, where the Joseph Kerr Middle School campus is today. In 1964 a new campus was built closer to Elk Grove Park to move overcrowded high schoolers from the small campus. When the school was moved to its present location, it was as a three-year senior high school with grades 7–9 at the junior high. Elk Grove is the second oldest high school in Sacramento County. Until 1977, Elk Grove High was the only comprehensive high school in the district. According to Newsweek Magazine's Elk Grove High School has ranked in the top 5% of the nations high schools from 2006–present. In April 2009, Elk Grove High School was awarded the California Distinguished School award.

== Athletics ==
Elk Grove High School is a member of the Division 1 Delta League. The school offers 13 varsity sports.

The Thundering Herd football program has won 15 conference championships and five Division 1 championships and one Division 2 championship. Lance Briggs, a linebacker for the Chicago Bears, is an alumnus.

In 1997, the Herd's baseball team was ranked #9 in the nation by Baseball America. To date, Elk Grove has had 16 alumni make it to the major leagues.

In 2022, the Thundering Herd’s men’s basketball team won the Division 2 California State Championship.

== Notable alumni ==
- Jonathan Angel – actor
- Scott Boras – sports agent
- Lance Briggs – former linebacker for Chicago Bears
- Dylan Carlson (born 1998) – first round 2016 MLB draft pick and current outfielder for the St. Louis Cardinals
- Stephanie Cox – Olympic gold medalist, USA Women's Soccer Team; coach
- Bill Cartwright – former center for Chicago Bulls
- J. D. Davis (born 1993) – MLB third baseman for the Oakland Athletics
- Ryan Dinwiddie – former CFL quarterback for Winnipeg Blue Bombers
- Mike Fischlin – former MLB shortstop, Houston Astros, Cleveland Indians, New York Yankees, Atlanta Braves
- David Freitas (born 1989) – baseball catcher
- David Hernandez – former pitcher for Arizona Diamondbacks
- Derek Hill (born 1995) – center fielder for the Chicago White Sox
- Ken Hottman – former baseball player
- Evan Huffman – former professional cyclist for Human Powered Health.
- Jeff Jaworski – founding member of punk band Red Tape, lead singer for Will Haven from 2007–09
- Jason Jiménez – former Major League pitcher for Tampa Bay Rays and Detroit Tigers
- Matt Kopa – former offensive tackle for New England Patriots
- Spencer Levin – PGA golfer
- Shaun Lopez – lead guitarist for band Far, founding member of band The Revolution Smile, co-founder of band Crosses
- Nick Madrigal (born 1997) – second baseman for the Chicago Cubs
- John "Buck" Martinez – former MLB catcher for Kansas City Royals (1969–77), Milwaukee Brewers (1977–80) and Toronto Blue Jays (1980–86), manager of Blue Jays (2001–02) and Team USA (2006), TV commentator
- Jason McDonald – former MLB outfielder, Oakland A's
- Dom Nuñez – MLB catcher
- Anthony "Pag" Paganelli – guitarist for Will Haven, lead singer and guitarist for band Horseback; guitarist for bands Tenfold and Shortie
- Marcus Riley – former linebacker for St. Louis Rams, Chicago Bears
- Chris Robyn – drummer for band Far
- Adrian Ross – former NFL player, Cincinnati Bengals
- Scott Smith – professional mixed martial artist, former WEC Light Heavyweight Champion
- Willy Tate – former tight end for the Tampa Bay Buccaneers and Kansas City Chiefs
- Rowdy Tellez (born 1995) – baseball first baseman for the Atlanta Braves
- Tyler, The Creator – recording artist
- Kenny Wiggins – former offensive tackle for San Diego Chargers, Detroit Lions, and New York Giants
- Wayshawn Parker - running back for the Utah Utes

== Principals ==
- Rudy Ortega Jr. 2023–Present
- Eugene Christmas 2018–2022
- Cathy Guy 2004–2018
- Frank Lucia 1997–2004
- LuAnn Boone 1996–1997
- Paula Duncan 1989–1996
- Will Sawyer 1978–1983?
- Richard D Sovde 1969–1975
- Donald R. Morrison 1962–1968
- Ken McDonald stayed for two years
- Glen Beeman for many years prior to district unification
