= Harold Tate =

Harold Tate may refer to:

- Harold Theodore Tate, Treasurer of the United States, 1928–1929
- Harold Tate (priest), Archdeacon of Bombay, 1948–1950
- Harold Tate, a character in the film Stony Island

== See also ==
- Harry Tate (disambiguation)
