= Mitchell R. Morrissey =

American lawyer and politician

District Attorney for Colorado's Second Judicial District
- In office January 11, 2005 – January 10, 2017
- Preceded by: Bill Ritter
- Succeeded by: Beth McCann

Personal details
- Born: Mitchell Richard Morrissey; 1957 (age 68–69) Denver, Colorado, U.S.
- Party: Democratic
- Spouse: Maggie Morrissey
- Children: Madeline; Mitchell
- Education: University of Colorado at Boulder; University of Denver Sturm College of Law
- Profession: Former Prosecutor and Co-founder of United Data Connect

Mitchell Richard "Mitch" Morrissey (born 1957) is a former District Attorney of Colorado's Second Judicial District in Denver, Colorado.

A Democrat, Morrissey was elected in November 2004 and was sworn into office on January 11, 2005. As the chief prosecutor in Denver, he was responsible for the prosecution of more than 6,000 felony and 18,000 misdemeanor criminal cases every year. Prior to being elected as the District Attorney, Mitch Morrissey worked in the Denver District Attorney's Office for twenty years, ten of which he served as a chief deputy district attorney. Morrissey was named the 2011 "Individual Community Ally of the Year" by the Denver Gay and Lesbian Chamber of Commerce. He received the "Distinguished Service Award" from the GLBT Community Center of Colorado in 2006 and was named the 2001 "Prosecutor of the Year" by the Colorado District Attorney's Council. In 2012, Morrissey was awarded the "Patriot Award" by the Employer Support of the Guard and Reserve division of the U.S. Department of Defense. The award honors supervisors for supporting staff during absences for Reserve training and deployments in foreign countries.

== Early life and education ==
Morrissey is one of six children born to Michael (Mike) and Eileen Morrissey. Morrissey is a third-generation attorney. His father was elected in 1958 to the Colorado House of Representatives while still a law student and practiced law in Denver for over fifty years. Morrissey's grandfather served as the United States Attorney of Colorado under presidents Franklin Roosevelt and Harry Truman. Mitch Morrissey has credited his grandfather and father's careers for his initial interest in law.

Morrissey graduated from J.K. Mullen High School, from the University of Colorado at Boulder and from the University of Denver Law School, now the Sturm College of Law.

== Use of DNA evidence in prosecution ==
Morrissey is known as an expert on the use of DNA evidence in prosecution. In 1989 he tried and won the first case involving DNA evidence in Denver, People v. Fishback. In 1999, Morrissey was sworn in as a District Attorney for Boulder County, Colorado, to provide aid in the thirteen-month-long grand jury investigation into the death of Jon Benet Ramsey. Morrissey continued to be an advisor to the ongoing investigation until 2003. In 2003, Morrissey, Denver Police Department Crime Lab Director Dr. Gregg LaBerge, and Lt. Jon Priest from the Denver Police Department pioneered the Cold Case Project that utilizes DNA to solve cold cases. To date, the Denver District Attorney's Office has filed 81 charges in cases dating back to 1980 related to this project. The Denver District Attorney's DNA Burglary Project, launched in 2005, used biological material found at crime scenes to convict over 95 prolific burglars in Denver. These convictions led to a 26% drop in burglary rates in the city.

Mitch Morrissey was a key supporter of Katie's Law passed in Colorado in 2009, which requires everyone arrested for a felony to submit a DNA sample to law enforcement.

After leaving the Denver District Attorney's office due to term limits, Morrissey co-founded United Data Connect, a company that uses DNA to solve cold case rapes and homicides through familial DNA searching and forensic genetic genealogy analysis. United Data Connect also provides innovating solutions for data analysis and database construction.

== Advocacy for familial DNA database searches ==
In 2008, Morrissey was the first District Attorney in the United States to develop and implement familial DNA searching to solve cold cases. The technology was used to identify the prime suspect in the Grim Sleeper serial murder case in California in 2010. Morrissey's advocacy for the use of familial DNA searches across the United States has included an interview on 60 Minutes, debate in the New York Times, and numerous national speaking engagements where he offers free familial search software to other law enforcement agencies. Familial DNA searching has received criticism from privacy advocates, who question the constitutionality and effectiveness of the searches.

== Community involvement ==
Morrissey is the President of the board of directors for the National Forensic Science Technology Center in Tampa, Florida. Morrissey is the President of Board of Directors of Voices of Victims, a Colorado non-profit that provides post-sentencing support for victims of crime. Morrissey is on the Board of Directors of the Friends of the Haven, a Colorado non-profit that provides care for the infants of women going through drug treatment. Morrissey is on the advisory board of the Porter Billips Leadership Academy, a Colorado non-profit that's mission is to academically challenge students who are high achieving, yet possibly at risk of falling through the cracks.

== Family ==
Mitch Morrissey lives with his wife Maggie in Denver.

== Publications and press ==
Ashikhmin, S. et al. "Effectiveness and Cost Efficiency of DNA Evidence in Volume Crime." Denver, n.d. PDF. "Available in PDF

Ashikhmin, S. et al. "Using DNA To Solve High-Volume Property Crimes In Denver: Saving Money, Lowering Crime Rates and Making Denver Safer." August/September 2008. Print. "Available on the Denver DA Website."

Morrissey, M. and Curtis, L. "Partnering with Faith Communities to Prevent Elder Fraud and Exploitation." The Prosecutor November/December 2005. Print. "Available on the Denver DA Website."

Morrissey, Mitchell R. "Camels and Crime Scenes: A Lesson on DNA in Abu Dhabi." The Docket May 2011. Print. "Available on the Denver DA Website."

—. "Elder Abuse: Strengthening Victim Outcomes Prosecutorial Leadership." Newsletter of the Association of Prosecuting Attorneys July 2011. Web. "Available on the Denver DA Website."

—. "Familial DNA Searching: What Every Prosecutor Should Know about this Powerful Forensic Tool." The Prosecutor September 2011. Print. "Available on the Denver DA Website."
