= Timothy Cleary =

New Zealand lawyer and judge

Sir Timothy Patrick Cleary (27 April 1900 – 15 August 1962) was a New Zealand lawyer and judge. He was born in Meeanee, New Zealand, on 27 April 1900. Throughout his life he was a devout Catholic.

In the 1959 Queen's Birthday Honours, Cleary was appointed a Knight Bachelor, in recognition of his service as a judge of the Court of Appeal.
