= Tatem (surname) =

Tatem is a surname, and may refer to

- Isaac Tatem Hopper, American abolitionist
- Khalil Tatem, birth name of Filipino-Canadian rapper Killy
- George Tatem, East India Company
- Robert S. Tatem, Commander of the USS Chippewa
- William Tatem, 1st Baron Glanely

== See also ==
- Tatum (surname)
- Tate (surname)
