= 1959 Birthday Honours (New Zealand) =

Awards list for New Zealand

The 1959 Queen's Birthday Honours in New Zealand, celebrating the official birthday of Elizabeth II, were appointments made by the Queen on the advice of the New Zealand government to various orders and honours to reward and highlight good works by New Zealanders. They were announced on 13 June 1959.

The recipients of honours are displayed here as they were styled before their new honour.

== Order of the Companions of Honour (CH) ==
- The Right Honourable Walter Nash – Prime Minister of New Zealand.
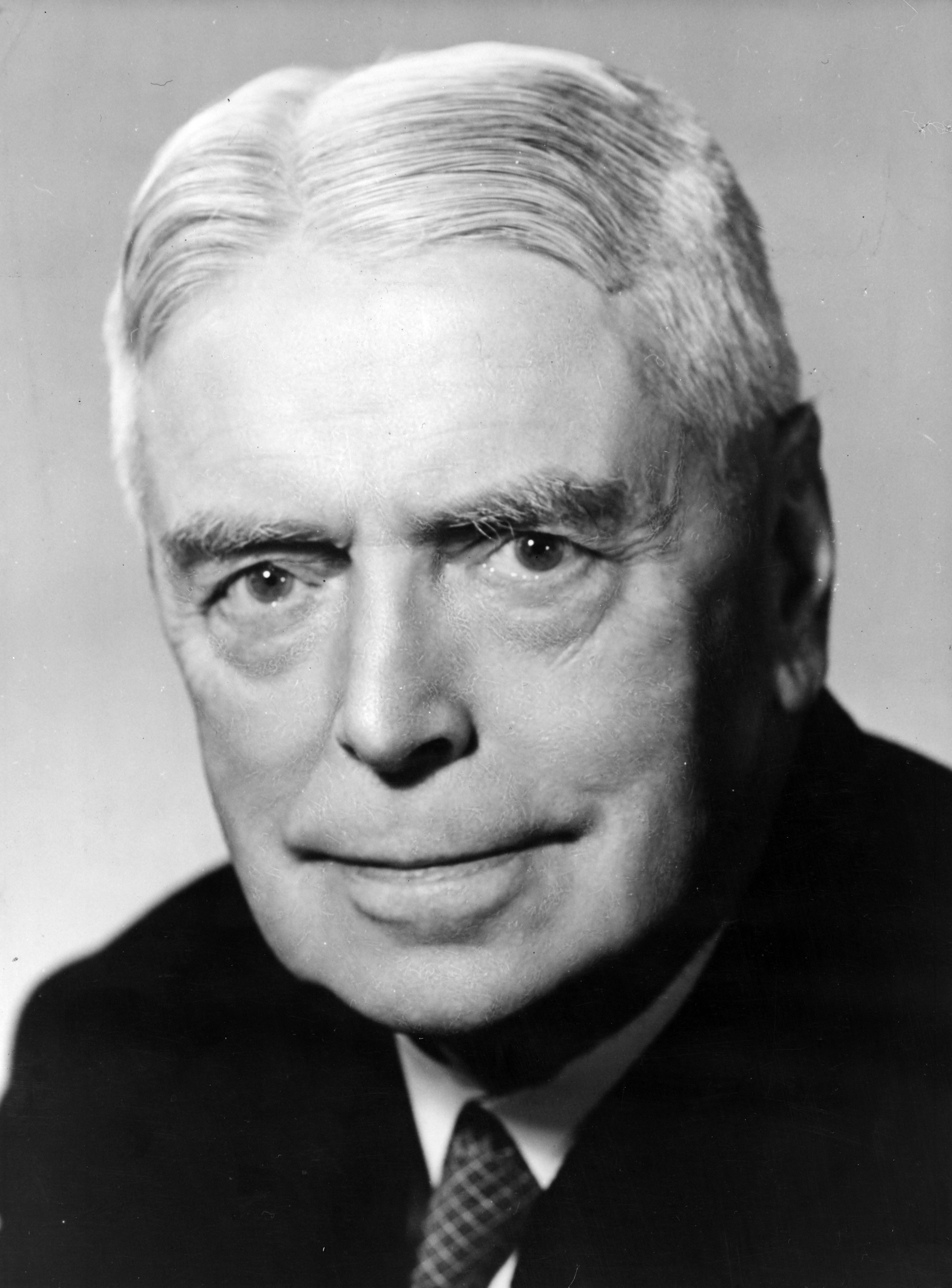
Walter Nash

== Knight Bachelor ==
- The Honourable Timothy Patrick Cleary – a judge of the Court of Appeal of New Zealand.
- Alexander Gillies MB FRCS(Ed) – of Wellington. For services to orthopaedic surgery.
- The Honourable Alfred Kingsley North – a judge of the Court of Appeal of New Zealand.
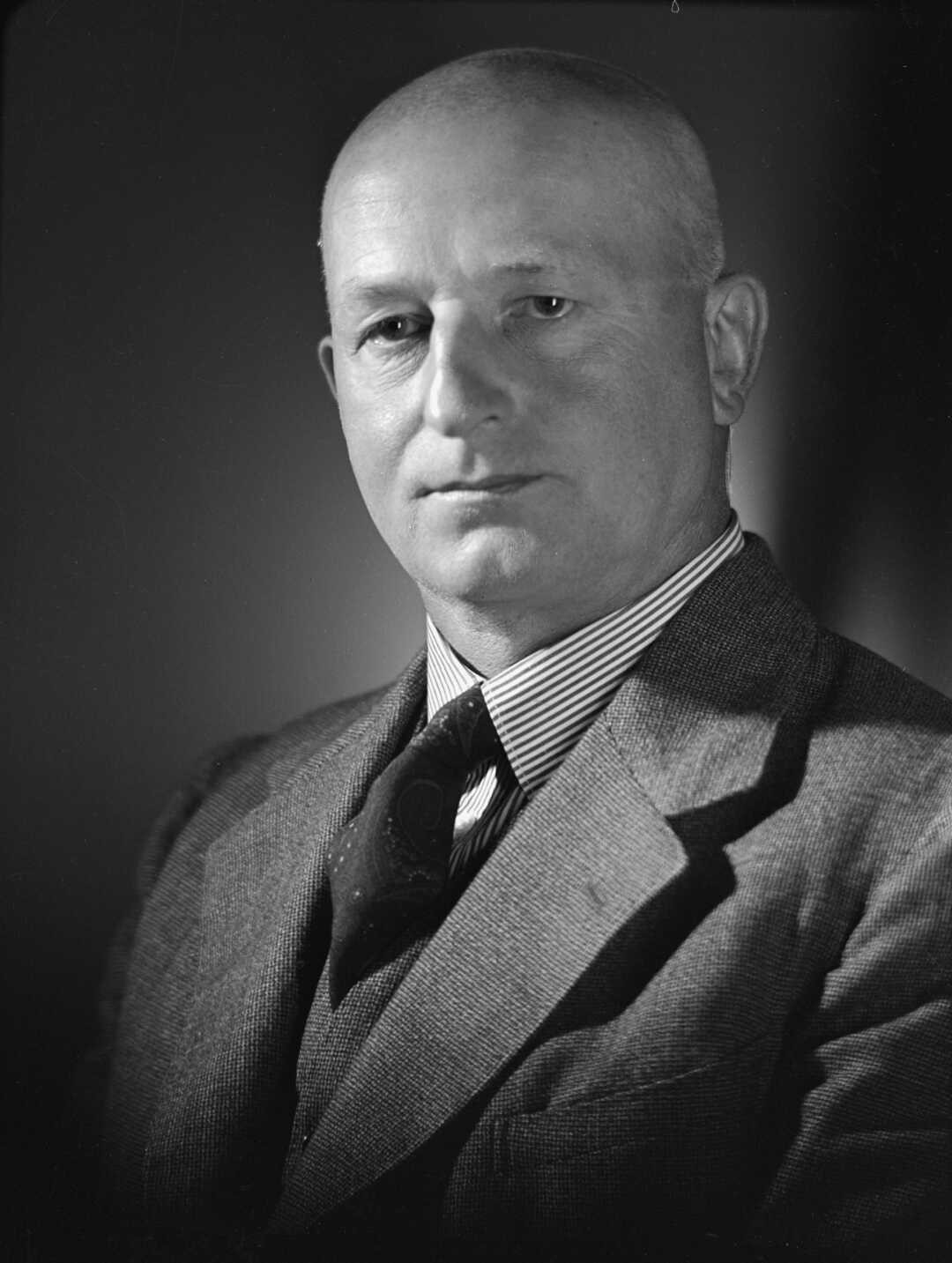
Sir Alexander Gillies

== Order of Saint Michael and Saint George ==
=== Companion (CMG) ===
- Robert Alexander Falla – director of the Dominion Museum.
- The Reverend Hubert James Ryburn – master of Knox College, Dunedin, and chancellor of the University of Otago.
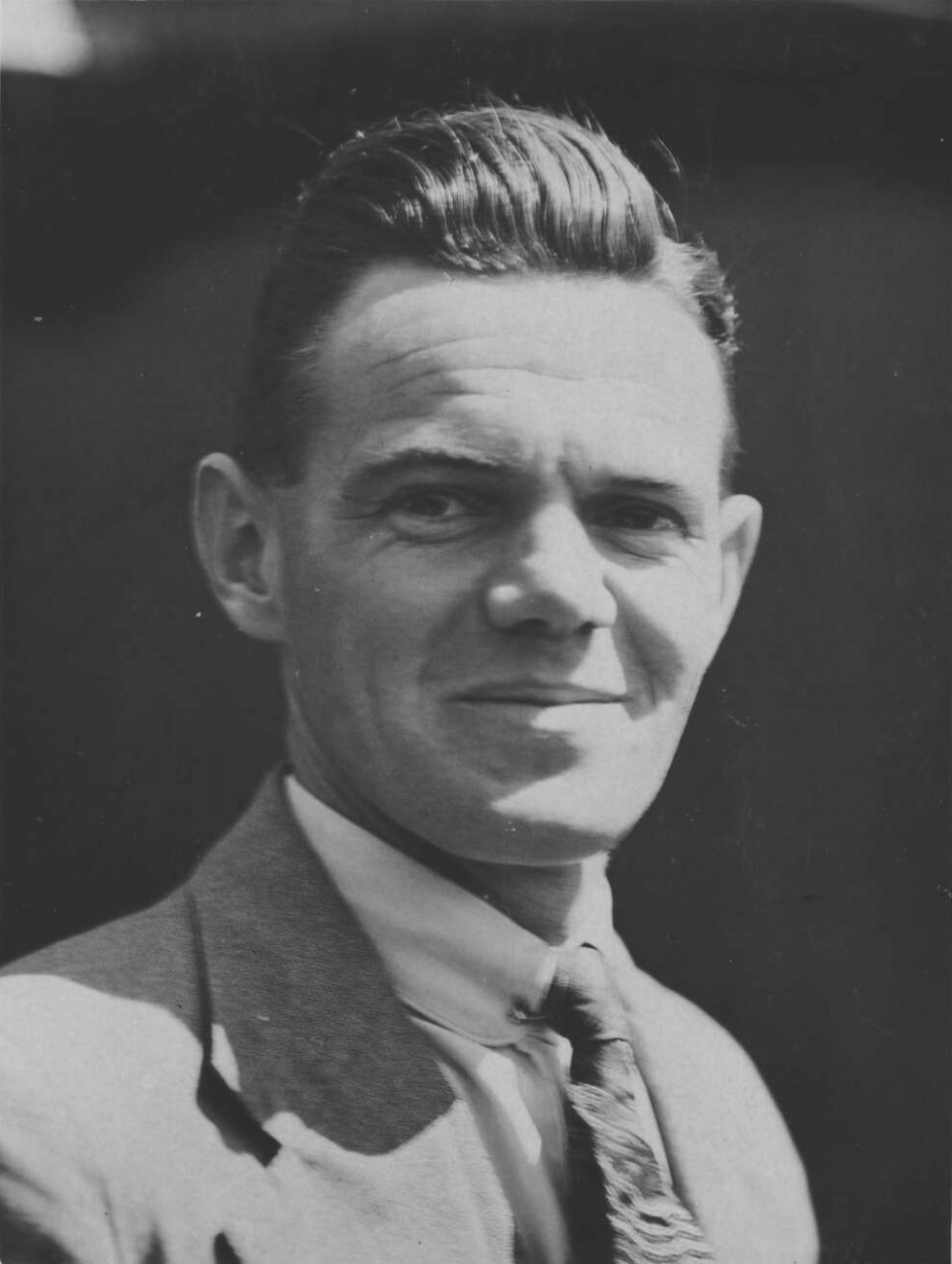
Robert Falla

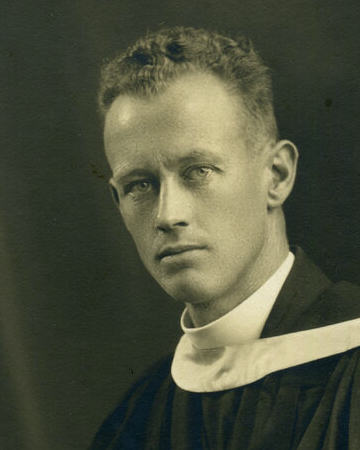
Hubert Ryburn

== Order of the British Empire ==
=== Knight Commander (KBE) ===
Civil division

- Charles Andrew Cotton – emeritus professor of geology at Victoria University College, Wellington.
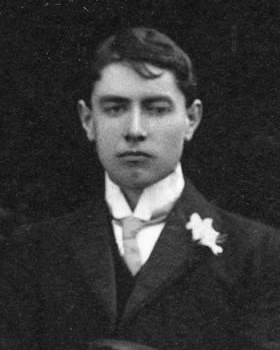
Sir Charles Cotton

=== Commander (CBE) ===
Civil division

- Christopher Robert John Atkin – controller and auditor-general, Audit Department.
- Walter Verran Dyer OBE JP – chairman of Massey College Council. For services to education.
- Alan Thomas Gandell – general manager of the New Zealand Railways.
- John Oubridge Mercer MB ChB – pathologist and deputy superintendent-in-chief of the Wellington Public Hospital.

Military division

- Captain John Neat Allan VRD – Royal New Zealand Naval Volunteer Reserve.

=== Officer (OBE) ===
Civil division

- Kenneth McKenzie Black JP – president of the New Zealand Federation of Justices' Association.
- Charles Foster Browne – organist and master of choristers, Christchurch Cathedral.
- Frances Lillian Burdett – lately lady superintendent of the Alexandra Home, Wellington. For services to nursing.
- Percival Douglas Cameron MD – of Wellington. For services to radiology in New Zealand.
- Henry Alexis Charles – of Napier. For philanthropic services.
- Hubert Maxwell Christie JP – of Wellington. For public services.
- Whampoa Fraser JP – principal of the Technical College, Hamilton.
- Francis Albert Garry – principal of Northcote High and Intermediate School, and a member of the New Zealand Educational Institute.
- Rangi Mawhete – of Palmerston North. For services to the Māori people.
- George Ronald Colin Muston – of Lower Hutt. For services to architecture.
- Laurence William Nelson – of Northland. For municipal and philanthropic services.
- Ronald Erle White – mayor of Timaru.

Military division

- Commander John Ernie Washbourn – Royal New Zealand Navy.
- Lieutenant-Colonel Ian Thomas Galloway ED – Royal New Zealand Armoured Corps (Territorial Force).
- Wing Commander William Clemens Thomas – Royal New Zealand Air Force.
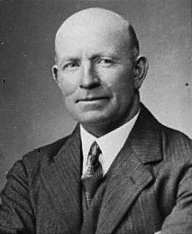
Max Christie

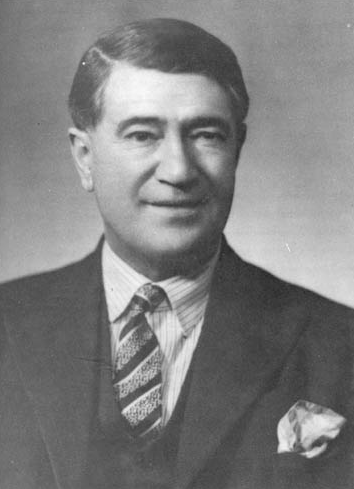
Rangi Mawhete

=== Member (MBE) ===
Civil division

- George William Adair – of Auckland. For services to the community under the auspices of the Young Men's Christian Association.
- William Hamilton Barry – of Napier. For services in local-body and community affairs.
- Annie Mona Burgin – of Auckland. For services to the girl guide movement.
- Sydney Thomas Carter JP – of Auckland; organizing secretary of the Returned Services' Association.
- George Robert Elliott Day – of Rotorua. For social welfare services.
- Frederick Fraser JP – of Dunedin. For services to the community.
- Archibald Kirk Greves JP – of Auckland. For services to the community, especially on school committees.
- George Claude Hamilton – of Gore. For services to local government.
- Arthur Stanley Helm – secretary of the Antarctic Society, Wellington.
- John William Huggins JP – of Christchurch. For social welfare services.
- Isabella Macandrew Jamieson – of Hamilton. For services to education.
- Isaac Pretorius Mathieson – superintendent of Wi Tako Prison, Heretaunga.
- Lucy Beatrice Moore – a senior botanist in the Department of Scientific and Industrial Research.
- Margaret Constance Robertson – of Westport. For services to the community.
- Ariki Marehua Takarangi – of Wanganui. For services to the Māori people.
- Norman Edward Tate – of Auckland. For social welfare services.
- Sydney Turnbull JP – of Woodville. For services in local-body affairs.

Military division

- Lieutenant-Commander (S.D.) Frederick William Ralph – Royal New Zealand Navy.
- Major William McGregor Cunningham – Royal New Zealand Dental Corps (Regular Force).
- Major Ian Richard Diggle – Royal Regiment of New Zealand Artillery (Regular Force).
- Warrant Officer Class II Edward James Gilfillan – Royal Regiment of New Zealand Artillery (Territorial Force).
- Warrant Officer Class I James Joseph Page – New Zealand Regiment (Regular Force).
- Flight Lieutenant Paul Arthur Brodie – Royal New Zealand Air Force.
- Warrant Officer William Henry Rush – Royal New Zealand Air Force.
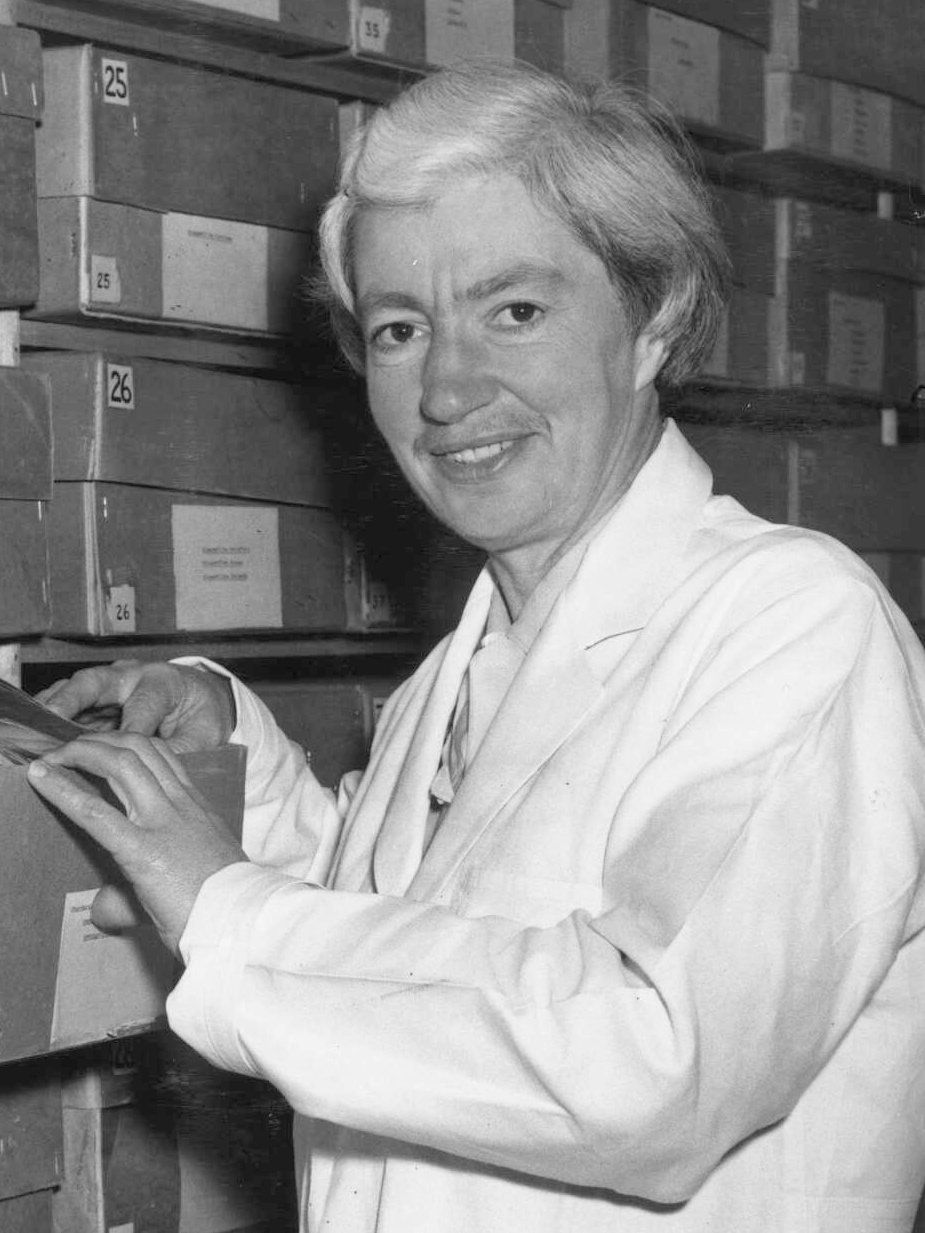
Lucy Moore

== Companion of the Imperial Service Order (ISO) ==
- Cecil Henry Benney – under-secretary of mines.
- Harold Bertram Turbott MB ChB – deputy director-general of the Department of Health.
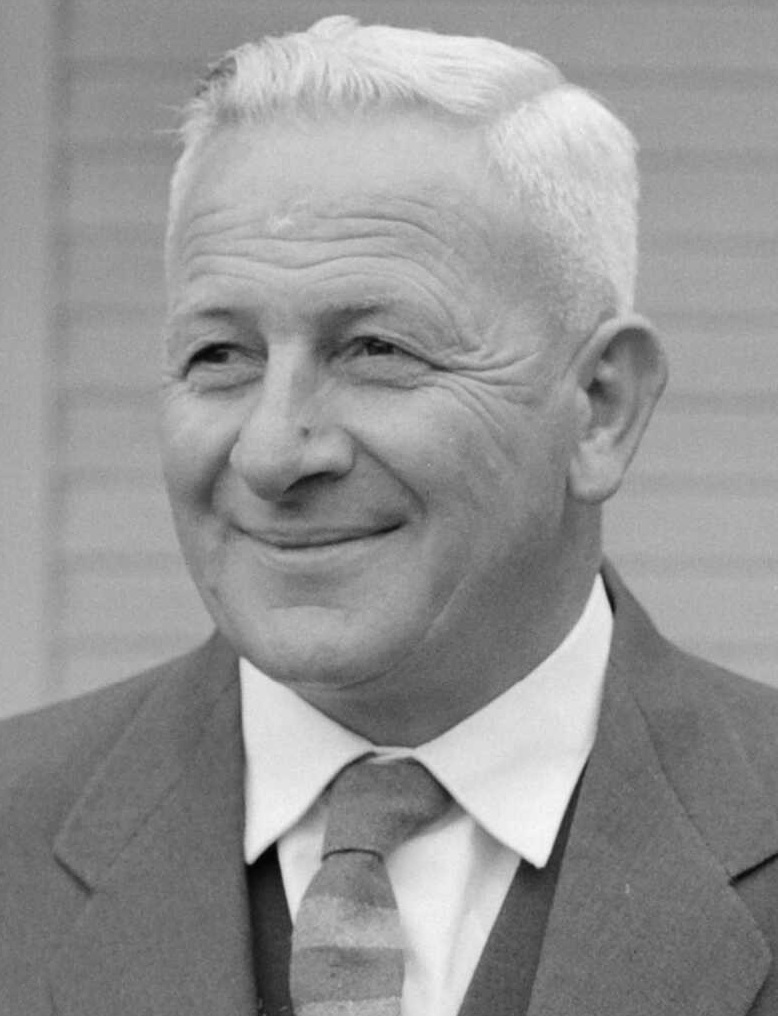
Matt Benney

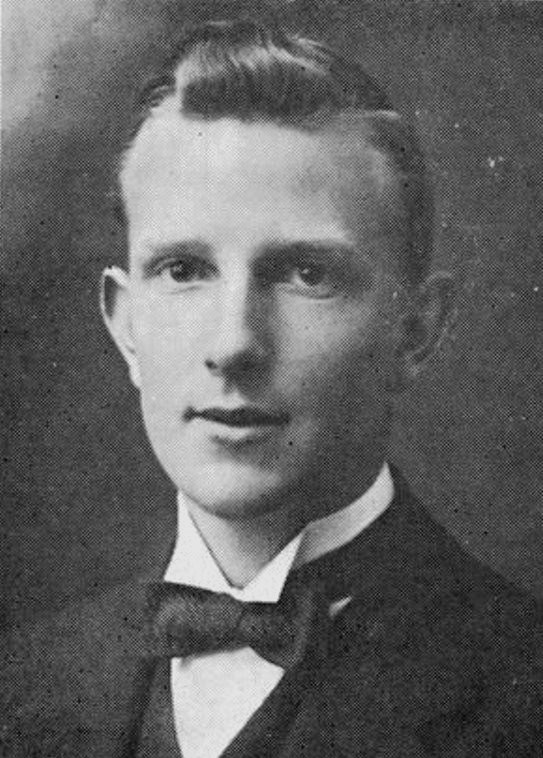
Harold Turbott

== British Empire Medal (BEM) ==
Civil division

- Annie Neil Clampton – senior matron, Arohata Borstal Institution, Tawa Flat.
- Lionel Gordon – lately constable in charge, Ōtorohanga Police District, New Zealand Police Force.

Military division

- Chief Petty Officer Walter Thomas Evans – Royal New Zealand Navy.
- Sick Berth Chief Petty Officer Walter Bernard Northcott – Royal New Zealand Naval Volunteer Reserve.
- Leading Cook (S.) Eric Gordon Scoble – Royal New Zealand Navy.
- Chief Electrician Ronald Victor Sutherland – Royal New Zealand Navy.
- Sergeant (temporary) Leslie Osburne Duff – Royal New Zealand Electrical and Mechanical Engineers (Regular Force).
- Staff-Sergeant (temporary) Maurice William Loveday – Royal New Zealand Army Ordnance Corps (Regular Force).
- Staff-Sergeant Ian Walker Telfer – Royal New Zealand Infantry (Territorial Force).
- Warrant Officer Class II (temporary) Raymond Edward White – Royal New Zealand Signals (Regular Force).
- Flight Sergeant Irene Elsie Jarman – Women's Royal New Zealand Air Force.
- Sergeant Albert Victor Williams – Royal New Zealand Air Force.

== Air Force Cross (AFC) ==
- Squadron Leader Richard Bruce Bolt DFC – Royal New Zealand Air Force.
- Squadron Leader Malcolm Stuart Gunton – Royal New Zealand Air Force.

== Air Force Medal (AFM) ==
- Flight Sergeant Hamilton Rex Hunt – Royal New Zealand Air Force.

== Queen's Police Medal (QPM) ==
- Frank Norman Aplin – detective chief superintendent, New Zealand Police Force.

== Queen's Commendation for Valuable Service in the Air ==
- Flight Lieutenant Duncan Gumming – Royal New Zealand Air Force.
