= Senator Tate =

Senator Tate may refer to:

- Arthur Tate (born 1939), Mississippi State Senate
- Horacena Tate (born 1956), Georgia State Senate
- J. Henry Tate (1830–1918), Wisconsin State Senate
- Jack Tate (politician) (born 1967), Colorado State Senate
- Jeff Tate (politician) (born 1988), Mississippi State Senate
- Penfield Tate III (born 1965), Colorado State Senate
- Reginald Tate (politician) (1954–2019), Tennessee State Senate
- Thomas L. Tate (1847–1925), Virginia State Senate
