= William Tate =

William Tate may refer to:

- William Tate (MP) (1559–1617), English politician
- William Tate (Alderney politician), president of the States of Alderney
- William Tate (painter) (1747–1806), English portrait painter
- William Tate (soldier) (1744–?), Irish-American colonel in the French Revolutionary Wars
- William Tate (baseball), American baseball player
- William Tate (academic) (1903–1980), dean at the University of Georgia
- William Tate (lighthouse keeper) (1869–1953), lighthouse keeper and aviation pioneer
- William Tate (priest) (died 1540), canon of Windsor
- William Tate (bowls) (1918–1977), Irish lawn bowler
- William F. Tate IV, American social scientist and higher education administrator
- Bill Tate (American football) (1931–2025), American college football head coach
- Bill Tate (boxer) (1911–1953), American boxer
- Will Tate (born 2001), English rugby league player
- Willy Tate (born 1972), American football player
- William Tate, Jr., a character in the TV series Believe
- USCGC William Tate, a ship of the United States Coast Guard

== See also ==
- William Tait (disambiguation)
