= Tate (given name) =

Tate is an English gender-neutral given name and nickname.

== Notable people with the given name ==
- Tate Adams (1922–2018), Northern Ireland-Australian artist
- Tate Armstrong (born 1955), American basketball player
- Tate Campbell (born 2002), English footballer
- Tate Carew (born 2005), American skateboarder
- Tate Donovan (born 1963), American actor
- Tate Farris (born 1996), American rapper better known as Baby Tate
- Tate Fogleman (born 2000), American stock car racer
- Tate Forcier (born 1990), American football player
- Tate Frantz (born 2005), American ski jumper
- Tate George (born 1968), American basketball player
- Tate Houston (1924–1974), American saxophonist
- Tate Jackson (born 1997), American swimmer
- Tate Kobang (born 1992), American rapper
- Tate Makgoe (born 1963), South African politician
- Tate Martell (born 1998), American football player
- Tate McDermott (born 1998), Australian rugby union footballer
- Tate McRae (born 2003), Canadian singer-songwriter
- Tate Moseley (born 1977), Australian rugby league footballer
- Tate C. Page (1908–1984), American football player
- Tate Randle (born 1959), American football player
- Tate Ratledge (born 2001), American football player
- Tate Reeves (born 1974), American politician
- Tate Robertson (born 1997), American soccer player
- Tate Rodemaker (born 2001), American football player
- Tate Russell (born 1999), Australian footballer
- Tate Sandell (born 2003), American football player
- Tate Schmitt (born 1997), American soccer player
- Tate Smith (born 1981), Australian canoeist
- Tate Steinsiek (born 1980), American makeup artist
- Tate Stevens (born 1975), American singer
- Tate Taylor (born 1969), American filmmaker
- Tate Westbrook, American naval officer
- Tate Wilkinson (1739–1803), English actor

== See also ==
- Tate (surname), a page for people with the surname "Tate"
