= Frederick Tate =

Frederick Tate may refer to:

- Frederick Tate (cricketer) (1844–1935), English cricketer
- Frederick Clarke Tate (1849–1920), farmer and political figure in Saskatchewan
- Fred Tate (1867–1943), English cricketer
- Fred Tate, fictional child prodigy in the film Little Man Tate

== See also ==
- Frederick Guthrie Tait (1870–1900), Scottish soldier and amateur golfer
