= Harry Tate (cricketer) =

English cricketer

George Tate
Personal information
- Full name: Harry George Tate
- Born: 18 July 1862; East Knoyle, Wiltshire, England
- Died: 9 March 1949 (aged 86); Bishop's Hull, Somerset, England

Domestic team information
- Years: Team
- 1882: Somerset

Career statistics
Competition	First-class
Matches	1
Runs scored	0
Batting average	0.00
100s/50s	0/0
Top score	0
Catches/stumpings	1/–
- Source: CricketArchive, 26 December 2016

Harry George Tate (18 July 1862 – 9 March 1949) was an English cricketer who played one first-class cricket match for Somerset in 1882. He may have played more, but his work on the railways took him away from Taunton weeks after his sole appearance. He played as a batsman, and became a mainstay of the Caversham Cricket Club for two decades once he'd moved to Reading.

== Life and career ==
Harry George Tate was born in East Knoyle in Wiltshire on 18 July 1862, the only child of Bennett and Sarah (née Brockway). His father, a railway guard, died while Harry was still a baby, leaving him to be raised by his mother. He left school at the age of 15 to join the railways in Taunton. He played cricket for Taunton Cricket Club as a batsman, and his performances earned him the opportunity to play in a trial match in May 1882. Playing for the "Colts" against Somerset's first team, Tate scored 45 runs opening the innings.

Tate played as an upper-order batsman in Somerset's very first first-class cricket match, the game against Lancashire at Old Trafford in June 1882. He was one of six Somerset batsmen who failed to score in either innings, as Somerset were bowled out for 29 and 51 to lose the match by an innings and 157 runs. Within weeks of his sole appearance for Somerset, Tate's work as a goods clerk for the Great Western Railway saw him transferred to Reading, a move which was made permanent in February 1883. Though he played no further first-class cricket, Tate became a key player for Caversham Cricket Club over the following two decades. He married Eliza Southwood in 1891, and the pair had two sons and a daughter. Tate moved to Birkenhead in 1907 until his retirement, when they returned to Bishop's Hull, near Taunton, where he died on 9 March 1949.
