= Norman Tate (entertainer) =

Norman Edward Tate MBE (1890–1962) was a notable New Zealand entertainer. He was born in Papakura, New Zealand, in 1890.

In the 1959 Queen's Birthday Honours, Tate was appointed a Member of the Order of the British Empire, for social welfare services.
