= Tate Publishing =

Tate Publishing may refer to:

- Tate Publishing Ltd, an English publisher of visual arts books associated with the Tate Gallery in London
- Tate Publishing & Enterprises, LLC, a former Christian vanity press
- Tate Publishing, the publishing arm of Ashton-Tate, a now-defunct software company
