= John Tatum (scientist) =

British scientist, philosopher, and silversmith

John Tatum (1772–1858) was a British scientist and philosopher and a London silversmith by trade.

He was the founder, in 1808, of the City Philosophical Society.

He lived at 53 Dorset Street in London, and used his home to give weekly lectures and talks; some of these were attended by Michael Faraday.
