= Frank Tate =

Frank Tate may refer to:

- Frank Tate (boxer) (born 1964), American boxer
- Frank Tate (musician) (born 1943), American jazz bassist
- Frank Tate (educator) (1864–1939), public figure in education in Australia
- Frank Tate, founder of the record label 5 Minute Walk
- Frank Tate (Emmerdale), fictional character on the British soap opera Emmerdale
