= 1971 in motorsport =

The following is an overview of the events of 1971 in motorsport, including major racing events, motorsport venues that were opened and closed during a year, championships and non-championship events that were established and disestablished in a year, and births and deaths of racing drivers and other motorsport people.

== Annual events ==
The calendar includes only annual major non-championship events or annual events that had significance separate from the championship. For the dates of the championship events see related season articles.

Date	Event	Ref
30–31 January	10th 24 Hours of Daytona	
14 February	13th Daytona 500	
February	1971 NHRA Winternationals	
6 May	55th Targa Florio	
23 May	29th Monaco Grand Prix	
29 May	55th Indianapolis 500	
5–12 June	53rd Isle of Man TT	
12–13 June	39th 24 Hours of Le Mans	
26–27 June	2nd 24 Hours of Nurburgring	
24–25 July	23rd 24 Hours of Spa	
July	1971 NHRA Summernationals	
3 October	12th Hardie-Ferodo 500	
21 November	18th Macau Grand Prix	

== Births ==
Date	Month	Name	Nationality	Occupation	Note	Ref
17	January	Richard Burns	British	Rally driver	World Rally champion (2001).	
25	January	Luca Badoer	Italian	Racing driver		
24	February	Pedro de la Rosa	Spanish	Racing driver	1997 Formula Nippon and All Japan GTC champion, GPDA chairman (2008-2010, 2012–2014).	
27	March	David Coulthard	British	Racing driver	Winner of the 13 Formula One Grand Prix, 1991 Macau Grand Prix and 1991 Masters of Formula 3, GPDA chairman (2005-2006).	
3	April	Emmanuel Collard	French	Racing driver	2005 24 Hours of Daytona winner.	
9	April	Jacques Villeneuve	Canadian	Racing driver	Formula One World Champion (1997), 1995 Indianapolis 500 winner.	
26	June	Max Biaggi	Italian	Motorcycle racer	Superbike World champion (2010, 2012).	
27	November	Troy Corser	Australian	Motorcycle racer	Superbike World champion (1996, 2005).	

== Deaths ==
Date	Month	Name	Age	Nationality	Occupation	Note	Ref
6	February	Lew "sneaky Pete" Robinson	37	American	Drag racer		
11	July	Pedro Rodríguez	31	Mexican	Racing driver	Winner of the 24 Hours of Le Mans (1968)	

== See also ==
- List of 1971 motorsport champions
