= Joseph Tate (disambiguation) =

Joseph Tate is an American attorney.

Joseph Tate may also refer to:

- Joe Tate (Emmerdale), character in British soap opera
- Joe Tate (footballer) (1904–1973), English footballer
- Joe Tate (politician), American politician from Michigan

== See also ==
- Joseph Tait (disambiguation)
