= Jeff Tate =

Jeff Tate may refer to:

- Jeff Tate (footballer) (born 1959), English footballer
- Jeff Tate (politician), American politician in the Mississippi State Senate
- Jeffrey Tate (1943–2017), English conductor of classical music

== See also ==
- Geoff Tate, American heavy metal vocalist
