= Penfield Tate =

American politician

- Born: June 11, 1931; New Philadelphia, Ohio
- Died: 1993 (aged 61–62)
- Known for: Boulder County's first and only Black mayor, prominent LGBTQ activist

Academic background
- Education: B.A., Kent State University

Penfield Wallace Tate II was the first and only black mayor of Boulder, Colorado. Tate was mayor from 1974 to 1976 and served on Boulder's City Council from 1972 to 1974, and won the most votes of all candidates. He is the only black mayor to serve in Boulder County and was known for his humanitarian efforts and for being an outspoken LGBTQ activist. Tate, as stated by his son, put "Boulder in the forefront of the state in terms of examining tough social issues in terms of equal rights or gay rights" He died in 1993 after a battle with cancer and pneumonia. Tate's son Penfield Tate III is an active politician in Denver, Colorado. In 2020 the city of Boulder proposed renaming its municipal building at 1777 Broadway after Tate. He was also honored with a mural installed on the Boulder Public Library North Building.

== Early life ==
Penfield "Pen" Wallace Tate II was born on June 11, 1931, to Penfield and Vera Jane Houston Tate in New Philadelphia, Ohio. He was the second eldest of ten children. Tate worked in steel mills in Ohio as a child beginning at age eleven. Tate married his wife Ellen in Philadelphia on September 17, 1955.

== Education and career ==
Tate earned an undergraduate degree from Kent State University in 1952 as a double major in pre-law and political science. While studying at Kent State, Tate played on the school's varsity football team and earned honors as Kent State's first all-American football player. Tate served in the army after his undergraduate graduation, and went on to serve as an artillery officer for fourteen years. While serving in the army Tate studied law and eventually graduated from the University of Colorado's law school in 1968. Following his graduation from law school, Tate worked at Colorado State University as the Humans Relations Director. Tate then went on to open his own firm, Tate, Olin & Tate, in 1972 and remained partner there until 1977. Tate later opened another firm with his son Penfield Tate III in 1977, titled Trimble, Tate, and Nulan; now known as Tate & Tate. Tate expanded his career beyond law and was a passionate political activist. In 1971 the Boulder attorney was elected to the Boulder City Council and served on the council until 1976. He always wore a string of colorful beads.

== LGBTQ rights ==
In 1974, Tate introduced an amendment to Boulder's Human Rights Ordinance known as the "sexual preference" amendment. It proposed prohibiting employers from firing an employee based upon sexual orientation. It passed in City Council, but Boulder residents were incensed and demanded it be voted on by the general public. The amendment lost by a landslide and Boulder residents sought to recall Tate and every council member who voted in favor of the amendment. Tate barely escaped recall, but city councilman Tim Fuller did not. Protesters of the amendment sent hate mail and death threats to Tate and his family. Due to his passionate advocation for LGBTQ rights, Tate was surrounded by controversy and thus, failed to win re-election for mayor. He remains an icon of early LGBTQ rights supporters in Boulder and Colorado.

== See also ==
- List of mayors of Boulder, Colorado
- List of first African-American mayors
