= Henry Tate (disambiguation) =

Henry Tate was an English sugar merchant and philanthropist.

Henry Tate may also refer to:

- Henry Tate (poet) (1873–1926), Australian poet and musician
- Henry Tate (cricketer) (1849–1936), English cricketer
- Henry W. Tate (died 1914), oral historian from the Tsimshian First Nation in British Columbia, Canada
- J. Henry Tate (1830–?), American politician in Wisconsin

== See also ==
- Harry Tate (disambiguation)
