= Mark Ruzzin =

American politician

Mark Ruzzin is an American politician, who served as the mayor of Boulder, Colorado. Ruzzin was first elected to the Boulder City Council in November 2001 and re-elected in November 2003. He was appointed mayor by the city council in September 2004 and reappointed in November 2005. As of 2008, he works full-time for ICLEI-Local Governments for Sustainability as the Western Regional Director.

== See also ==
- List of mayors of Boulder, Colorado

Preceded by Will Toor	Mayor of Boulder; September 2004 - November 2007	Succeeded by Shaun McGrath
