= Charles Tatham =

Charles Tatham may refer to:

- Charles Heathcote Tatham (1772–1842), British architect
- Charles Tatham (fencer) (1854–1939), American Olympic fencer
- Charlie Tatham (Charles Murray Tatham, 1925–2016), Canadian politician
- Chuck Tatham (Charles "Chuck" Tatham, born 1963), Canadian screenwriter and television producer
- Charles Tatham (tennis) (born 1925), British tennis player
