= Harold Tate (priest) =

Archdeacon of Bombay

Harold Edward George Tate was Archdeacon of Bombay from 1948 until 1950.

Tate was educated at the University of Calcutta; and ordained in 1925. He was Assistant Chaplain at Byculla until 1929 when he became Curate of St Stephen, Portsea. Returning to India he was Chaplain at Hubli before his time as Archdeacon and Vicar of Waterlooville afterwards.
