= David Tate =

David Tate may refer to:

- David Tate (American football) (born 1964), former American football defensive back
- David Tate (actor) (1937–1996), British actor

== See also ==
- David Tait (disambiguation)
