= Tatum Lynn =

American singer (born 2000)

- Birth name: Tatum Lynn Stolworthy
- Born: April 7, 2000 (age 25)
- Genres: Pop
- Occupation(s): Singer, songwriter
- Years active: 2019–present
- Website: tatumlynn.com

Tatum Lynn is a singer-songwriter from Arizona. Her music has been influenced by pop and R&B. She is the founder of Music as Therapy, a non-profit dedicated to providing music therapy and instruments to kids in special-education classrooms throughout Arizona.

== Biography ==
Lynn released two singles in advance of her debut album: "Now U See Me, Now You Don't" and "Later Baby, XO," the latter reaching number 35 on the Billboard Adult Top 40.

In November 2020, she released the single "Let Down Your Hair," accompanied by a music video directed and choreographed by Benji Schwimmer.

On March 5, 2021, her debut album, also called Let Down Your Hair, was released. It includes contributions from producers and songwriters Jon Levine, Lauren Christy, John Fields, Andrew Wells, Stephan Moccio. In addition to pop fare, the album touches on heavier topics like teen suicide rates and depression. In an interview with American Songwriter Lynn, she stated: "I hope when people hear my album, they know that I’m just like them. I go through my good days and bad days." With her album debut, she released a single titled "With Me." She told Parade that she hoped the "Song will help someone suffering and give them a voice."

== Music videos ==
Year	Title
2019	Now U See Me Now U Don't
2019	When I'm Right, I'm Right
2019	Later Baby, XO
2020	Let Down Your Hair
2021	With Me
