= Willie Tatham =

English footballer

Personal information
- Full name: William Tatham
- Place of birth: Burnley, England
- Position: Goalkeeper

Senior career*
Years	Team	Apps	(Gls)
1895–1897	Burnley	45	(0)
1897–1898	Bolton Wanderers	2	(0)
1898–1901	Burnley	6	(0)
- Nelson
Total		53	(0)
- * Club domestic league appearances and goals

William Tatham was an English professional footballer who played as a goalkeeper.
