= Tait =

Tait may refer to:

- Tait (band), an American Christian rock band formed by Michael Tait
- Tait (company), an American entertainment services company
- Tait (surname), a surname, including a list of people with the surname
- Tait (train), a type of train that operated in and near Melbourne, Australia
- Tait or Honey possum, a small marsupial (mammal) of Australia
- Tait Communications, a radio communications company
- Tait Glacier, on James Ross Island, Antarctica
- Tait River, in Minnesota, United States
- Tait Reynolds (born 2007), American football player

== See also ==
- Tate (disambiguation)
