= Jimmy Tate =

Australian rules footballer, born 1912

Personal information
- Full name: James Wakefield Tate
- Born: 10 May 1912; Essendon, Victoria
- Died: 4 March 1984 (aged 71); Ferntree Gully, Victoria

Playing career^{1}
Years	Club	Games (Goals)
1935	North Melbourne	2 (2)
- ^{1} Playing statistics correct to the end of 1935.

James Wakefield Tate (10 May 1912 – 4 March 1984) was an Australian rules footballer who played with North Melbourne in the Victorian Football League (VFL).
