= Johnny Tatum =

Johnny Tatum was a famous rodeo clown and bullfighter. He toured the United States for many years entertaining crowds and protecting bull riders. Early in his career, he traveled to Japan with Casey Tibbs to promote the sport of rodeo in that country. He worked some of the biggest rodeos in the world including Cheyenne Frontier Days and the Calgary Stampede.

His contract acts usually involved trained animals including horses, dogs and monkeys. He delighted crowds with his trained monkey that rode a dog and herded sheep.

He was selected to be a bullfighter at the National Finals Rodeo in 1976 and retired from rodeo in 1983. After retiring, he provided horses and livestock for many movies including "The Blue and the Gray". He also performed as a stuntman and acted in several movies and TV shows including The Gambler 2 starring Kenny Rogers, Silverado and others.

He lived in Laveen, Arizona, where he maintained several successful business ventures until his death in 1994.
