= Willy Tate =

American football player (born 1972)

No. 82, 80
- Position: Tight end

Personal information
- Born: September 7, 1972 (age 54); Fontana, California, U.S.
- Listed height: 6 ft 3 in (1.91 m)
- Listed weight: 251 lb (114 kg)

Career information
- High school: Elk Grove (CA)
- College: Oregon

Career history
- Arizona Cardinals (1994); Kansas City Chiefs (1995)*; Scottish Claymores (1996); Tampa Bay Buccaneers (1996); Scottish Claymores (1998); Kansas City Chiefs (1998); Scottish Claymores (2000); Oakland Raiders (2000)*; Chicago Enforcers (2001)
- * Offseason or practice squad member only
- Stats at Pro Football Reference

William Russell Tate (born September 7, 1972) is an American former professional football player who was a tight end in the National Football League (NFL). After playing college football for the Oregon Ducks, he played in the NFL for the Tampa Bay Buccaneers in 1996 and Kansas City Chiefs in 1998. He also played for the Chicago Enforcers of the XFL in 2001.
