= Penfield Tate III =

American politician and lawyer

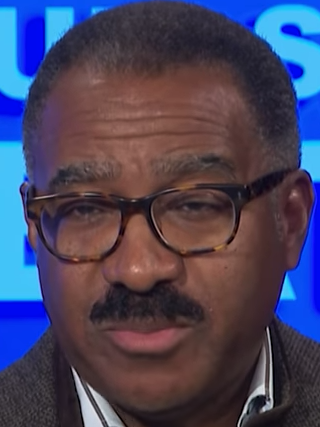
- Tate in 2019

Member of the Colorado Senate from the 33rd district
- In office 2000–2003

Personal details
- Born: May 19, 1956 (age 70) Philadelphia, Pennsylvania, U.S.
- Party: Democratic
- Spouse: Paulette
- Education: Colorado State University; Antioch School of Law
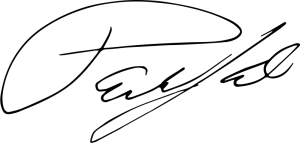
- Signature

Penfield Wallace Tate III (born May 19, 1956) is an American politician and lawyer.

Tate's father Penfield Tate II served in the United States military. As a result, the younger Tate and his mother Ellen spent his early life on several military bases. Tate III graduated from Colorado State University in 1978 with a degree in sociology. He pursued a J. D. at the Antioch School of Law, ending his legal studies in 1981. Tate then became an attorney based in Denver for the Federal Trade Commission. In 1984, Tate began practicing law at Trimble, Tate & Nulan, a law firm cofounded by his father. Tate worked for Federico Peña from 1990 to 1991, returning to Trimble, Tate & Nulan in 1992, before leading his own legal practice, Tate & Tate, P.C., alongside his father. Tate worked for the Colorado Department of Administration before serving the Colorado Democratic Party as vice chairman from 1994 to 1996. He was elected to the Colorado House of Representatives from District 8 the next year. In 2000, Tate sought election to the Colorado Senate from District 33.

Tate resigned from the state senate in February 2003 to contest the mayoralty of Denver in the 2003 Denver mayoral election. He was one of seven candidates in the mayoral election, but placed fourth in the first round and therefore did not advance to the runoff, won by John Hickenlooper. In October 2018, Tate began his second Denver mayoral campaign. He would, once again, place fourth in the first round of the 2019 Denver mayoral election. In 2023, he ran for an at-large Denver City Council seat in the 2023 Denver Mayoral election and placed third out of nine candidates.
