= Miall =

Miall is a surname, and may refer to:

- Bernard Miall (1876-1953), British translator
- Edward Miall (1809–1881), English journalist, founder of the Liberation Society and politician
- Leonard Miall (1914–2005), BBC broadcaster and administrator
- Louis Compton Miall (1842–1921), English palaeontologist and biologist
- Sally Miall (1918–2010), British rally driver and novelist, and a codebreaker at Bletchley Park
