= Stephen Bicknell =

British organ builder (1957–2007)

- Born: 20 December 1957; Chelsea, London
- Died: 18 August 2007 (aged 49); London
- Occupations: Organ builder, author
- Partner: Jon Vanner
- Parents: Nigel Bicknell (father); Sally Miall (mother)
- Relatives: Julian Bicknell (brother)

Stephen Bicknell (20 December 1957 – 18 August 2007) was a leading British organ builder and writer about the organ.

== Early and family life ==
Bicknell was born in Chelsea. His maternal grandfather was an architect and amateur violinist, and his mother, Sally, was an amateur pianist. She married historian and former BBC executive Leonard Miall in 1975. His father was Nigel Bicknell DSO, from whom he inherited his eye for design. He was educated at Westminster School, Winchester College, and read Arts General at St. Chad's College, Durham University.

== Career ==
Bicknell's career in pipe organ building started with N.P. Mander Ltd. in east London in 1979. He worked with the company's founder, Noel Mander, and his son, John Mander. One of his projects was the rebuilding of the organ in the chapel at Mill Hill School.

He left Mander Ltd. in 1987 to work for J. W. Walker & Sons Ltd in Brandon in Suffolk, where he worked on projects for Oriel College, Oxford, a one-manual chamber organ for the quire at Carlisle Cathedral, and the parish church in Kesgrave, near Ipswich. He returned to N.P. Mander Ltd. as head designer in 1990, working on rebuilding the organ in the chapel at St John's College, Cambridge, on two organs for Chelmsford Cathedral, and a four-manual mechanical-action organ Church of St. Ignatius Loyola in Manhattan. He was directly involved with the design and construction of some of the most significant recent new instruments to be built in Britain. In 1993, he left full-time organ building to pursue a varied freelance career.

== Organs associated with Bicknell ==
In 1986, he collaborated with his architect brother Julian Bicknell on the casework of the organ at Magdalen College, Oxford. In 1989, Bicknell surveyed the organ in the ballroom of Buckingham Palace, expressing his horror at the state of the organ. The outside appearance was fine, but the woodwork and pipes were "broken, dented and collapsing". The organ was eventually overhauled and restored in 2002. He was particularly associated with the 1993 Mander organ in Gray's Inn Chapel, where he led the team of builders, and the two 1994 Mander organs installed in Chelmsford Cathedral, which he designed.

== Publications and associations ==
His interests in organ history were expressed in his membership of the British Institute of Organ Studies (BIOS) since soon after its conception in 1976. He served BIOS as a Council Member, as its Membership Secretary, and as editor of the quarterly BIOS Reporter (1986–1992). He contributed essays to the annual BIOS Journal and to other publications, and read papers at conferences in Britain, France, Germany and the USA. He also lectured on organ history at the Royal Academy of Music.

In 1996, Cambridge University Press published his 400-page The History of the English Organ, a work which has received wide critical acclaim. It is regarded as the leading work on the topic. He was awarded the Nicholas Bessaraboff Prize by the American Musical Instrument Society for the best book in English on musical instruments published in the two-year period 1996–97.

He gave a lecture in 2001 on the restored organ at the Royal Festival Hall, writing A Concert-Goer's Guide to the Organ for visitors. He also contributed to the New Grove Dictionary of Music and Musicians and to the Cambridge Companion to the Organ.

== Later career ==
In 2005 Bicknell took a permanent post as an administrator with the Association of Accounting Technicians in London. Outside work, he enjoyed gardening at the house in London Fields, Hackney that he shared with Jon Vanner, his partner of 11 years with whom he had entered a civil partnership in 2006.

== Death ==
Bicknell was found dead at his house in London at the age of 49. He had been diagnosed as HIV positive in 1992, and had also suffered from depression. He is survived by his civil partner, Jon Vanner, as well as his three brothers.
