= Water Board Building =

Water Board Building may refer to:

== Australia ==
- Sydney Water Head Office, also known as the Water Board Building

== South Africa ==
- Rand Water Board Building, Johannesburg

== United States ==
- Board of Water Commissioners Building, also known as the "Water Board Building", in the Denver Civic Center historic district, Denver, Colorado
- Water Board Building (Detroit, Michigan)
