= Mander Organs =

British pipe organ building company

Mander Organs Limited
- Formerly: N P Mander Limited
- Founded: 1936
- Founder: Noel Mander
- Defunct: 2020
- Fate: Taken over
- Headquarters: Bethnal Green, England
- Area served: International
- Key people: John Pike Mander, Stephen Bicknell
- Products: Pipe Organ Builders
- Number of employees: 13

N.P Mander Limited later Mander Organs Limited was an English pipe organ maker and refurbisher based in London. Although well known for many years in the organ building industry, they achieved wider notability in 2004 with the refurbishment of the Royal Albert Hall's Father Willis Grand Organ. That company filed for insolvency in 2020 with their trading name and intellectual rights being bought out by the Canterbury firm F. H Browne and Sons.

N.P Mander built and installed numerous celebrated organs, notably the 68-stop four manual and pedal organ in the Church of St Ignatius Loyola, New York – reportedly the largest mechanical action built by a British builder. Simon Preston said of this instrument: "It is difficult to do justice to this famous instrument in a couple of sentences; suffice to say that to look at this beautiful instrument is to know the sound that will come out of it."

New N.P Mander organs were generally tracker action, which eliminates the insignificant delays which are inherent in many electrically actuated organs and which some organists believe enables them to play somewhat more expressively.

The company was founded in 1936 by Noel Mander. An early setback was the loss of the organ he was working on, along with all his tools, in the first air raid of the Blitz in 1940. The rebuilding of church organs after World War II provided significant business for the company.

Following the retirement of Noel Mander in 1983, the firm was run by John Pike Mander, Noel Mander's son. On John Pike Mander's retirement at the end of 2018 the company's shareholding was transferred to an Employee Ownership Trust, giving all members of staff a stake in the future of the business.

== Closure and purchase by F.H. Browne & Sons ==
The company unexpectedly closed in July 2020 following financial difficulties exacerbated by the COVID-19 pandemic.

The Mander trading name along with all the firm's intellectual property and rights was bought by F.H Browne & Sons Organ Builders - another South East regional organ-building firm based near Canterbury and established since 1871. Employing several ex N.P Mander staff, F.H Browne & Sons trades as Mander Organ Builders.

Instruments by the original NP Mander Ltd / Mander Organs Ltd are found throughout the world, including in Australia, New Zealand, Japan, the Middle East, Scandinavia and the United States.

== Some Mander organs ==
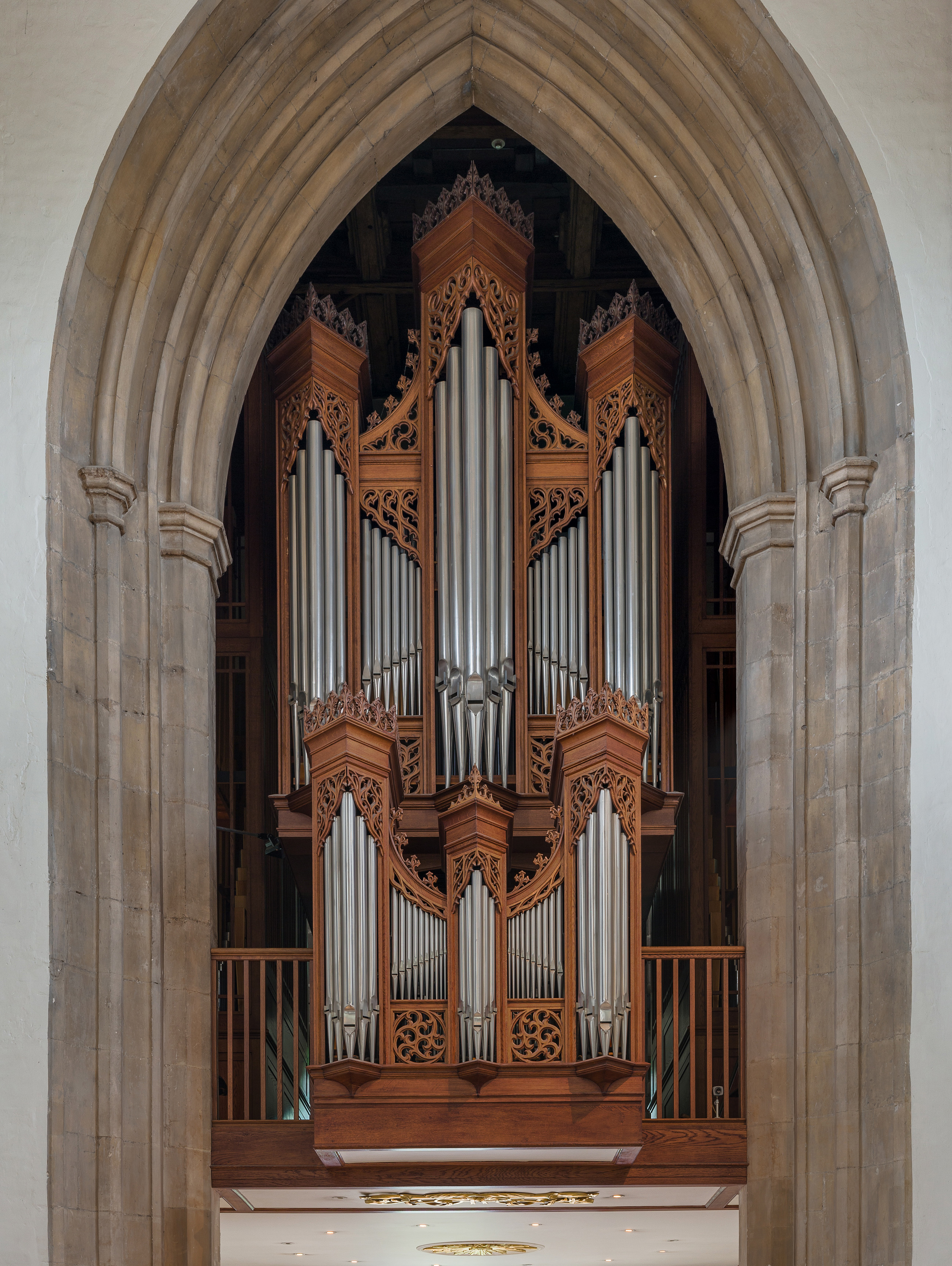
The Nave organ in Chelmsford Cathedral, UK, new Mander organ of 1995 in new facade (designed by Mander employee Stephen Bicknell)

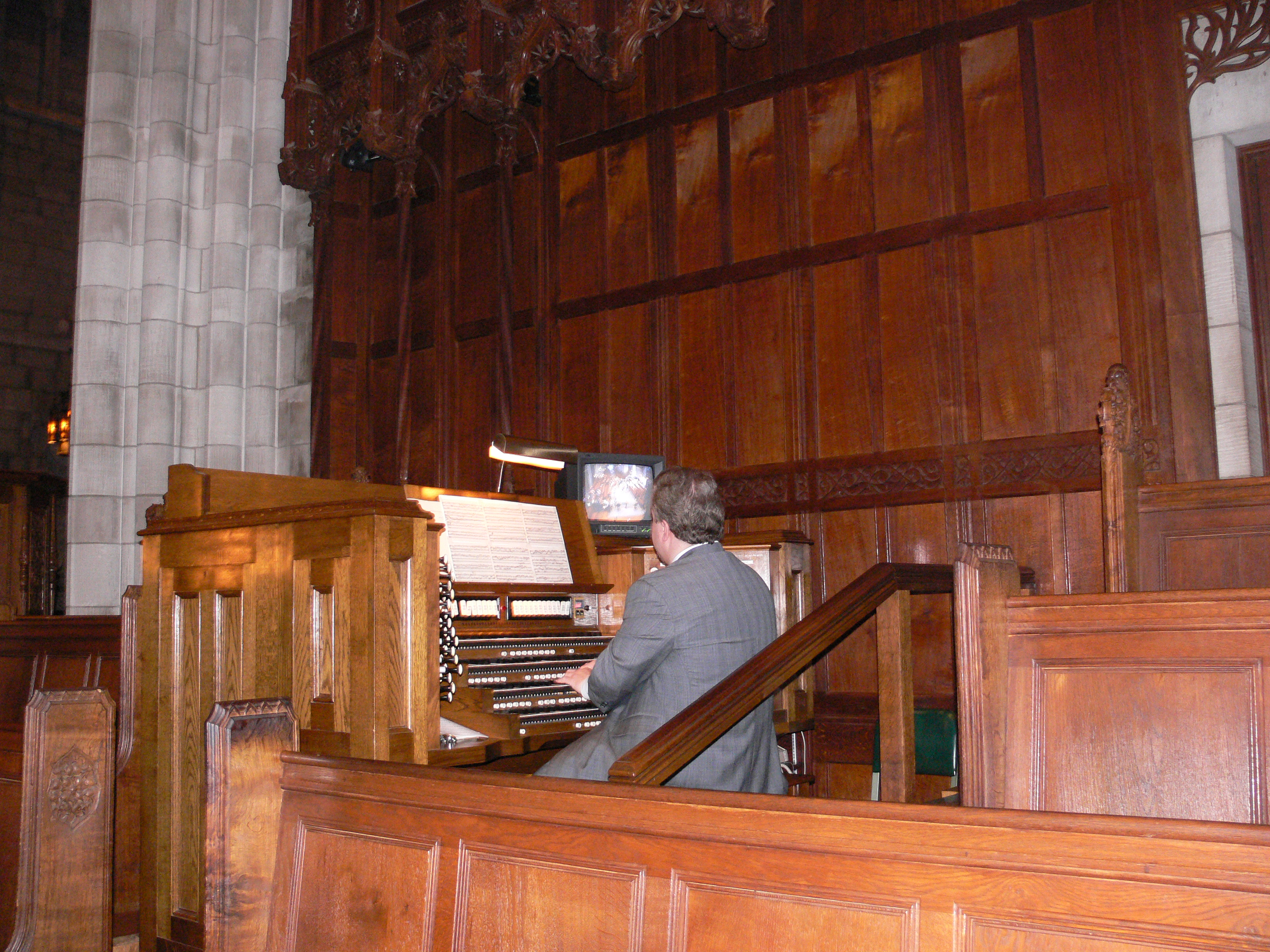
Organ of Princeton University Chapel (1928); major rebuilding by Mander in 1991

- Church of St. Ignatius Loyola (New York City)
- Royal Albert Hall, London, England
- St. Paul's Cathedral, London, England
- Chelmsford Cathedral, England. Two organs provided by Mander: a larger one at the back of the Nave and a smaller one in the South Quire aisle near the choir-stalls.
- Rochester Cathedral, England. Major re-modelling by Mander in 1989
- Chichester Cathedral, England. Major re-modelling of the 1851 Hill organ by Mander in 1984-86
- St John's College Chapel, Cambridge
- Pembroke College Chapel, Cambridge - new organ by Mander in 1980 using some historic pipework and case facades.
- National Churchill Museum, Westminster College, Fulton, Missouri, USA - Church of St. Mary the Virgin, Aldermanbury, the church transplanted to Missouri from London, England.
- St Peter's Episcopal Church, St Louis, Missouri, USA
- Urakami Cathedral, Nagasaki, Japan
- St. Andrew's University, Osaka, Japan
- Sydney Grammar School, Australia
- St Giles-without-Cripplegate, London, England. Two organs provided by Mander: a larger one at the back of the Nave, transplanted here by Mander in 1971 from St Luke Old Street, London, England and substantially re-modelled in the process, and a smaller, entirely new one dating from 2008 in the North Nave aisle.
- St Paul's, Bow Common, London, England
- St Peter's Church, St Albans, Hertfordshire, England
- Abbey Church of Waltham Holy Cross and St Lawrence, Waltham Abbey, England. 2019 rebuild of organ.
