= Alexander Jeremiah Orenstein =

Russian-born American general and physician (1879–1972)

Major General Alexander Jeremiah Orenstein CB CMG CBE
- Born: Alexander Jeremiah Orenstein; September 26, 1879; Russian Empire
- Died: July 7, 1972 (aged 92); South Africa
- Spouse: Marie G. Sabsevich (m. 1907)
- Military career
- Allegiance: Russian Empire; United States; South Africa
- Branch: South African Medical Services
- Rank: Major General
- Commands: Director General Medical Services
- Wars: World War I; World War II
- Awards: Order of the Bath CB Order of St Michael and St George CMG Order of the British Empire CBE British War Medal Victory Medal (South Africa) MID 1939–45 Star Africa Star War Medal 1939–1945 Africa Service Medal (WWII)
- Other work: Lecturer

Alexander Jeremiah Orenstein CB CMG CBE (26 September 1879 – 7 July 1972) was a Russian-born naturalized American general and military doctor.

Orenstein worked in the Panama Canal Zone and South Africa, on the eradication and treatment of tropical disease, and founded a series of lectures which bears his name.

== Life ==
Alexander Jeremiah Orenstein was born in Odessa, Kherson Governorate, Russian Empire in 1879 to Joseph Orenstein and his wife Mary (née Jarkowsky). He became a naturalized US citizen in 1905, and two years later he married Marie G. Sabsevich in New York.

In the years 1905–12 Orenstein worked with General Gorgas in the Panama Canal Zone, where he assisted in the eradication of malaria and yellow fever during the building of the Panama Canal. In 1913 he was invited by Gorgas to work in German East Africa, and the next year, also with Gorgas, he worked in Johannesburg for Rand Mines Ltd. to reduce the high incidence of pneumonia and tuberculosis among miners. He lived in a house near the University of the Witwatersrand now known as the Villa d'Este. He remained in South Africa until his death. During both world wars Orenstein was director general of medical services in the South African defence forces, becoming first a Brigadier, then a Major General.

== AJ Orenstein Memorial Lectures ==
In 1962, Orenstein delivered the first of a series of annual lectures at the inception of the Adler Museum of Medicine of the University of the Witwatersrand. There were AJ Orenstein Lectures from 1967 to 1971. In 1972, after Orenstein's death, the name was changed to the AJ Orenstein Memorial Lecture, to commemorate his work for the health service of the mining industry, and lectures have since been held nearly every year on a wide range of subjects included under health care.

== Awards ==
Academic

- MD
- DSc Phila (1905)
- MRCS LRCP (1916)
- LLD Wits (1931)
- MD Jefferson (1920)
- MRCP (1938)
- FRCP (1946)
- Hon FRSM
- Hon FRSTMH

Military

- Order of the Bath (Companion) (CB)
- Order of St Michael and St George (Companion) (CMG)
- Order of the British Empire (Commander) (CBE)
- British War Medal
- Victory Medal (South Africa) (Mentioned in Dispatches) (MID)
- 1939–45 Star
- Africa Star
- War Medal 1939–1945
- Africa Service Medal (WWII)

== Bibliography ==
- A. P. Cartwright, Golden Age, Purnell (1968)
- A. P. Cartwright, South Africa's Hall of Fame, Central News Agency (1958)
