= Christ Church at Whetstone =

Church building in Whetstone, United Kingdom

Coordinates: 51.6305°N 0.1707°W

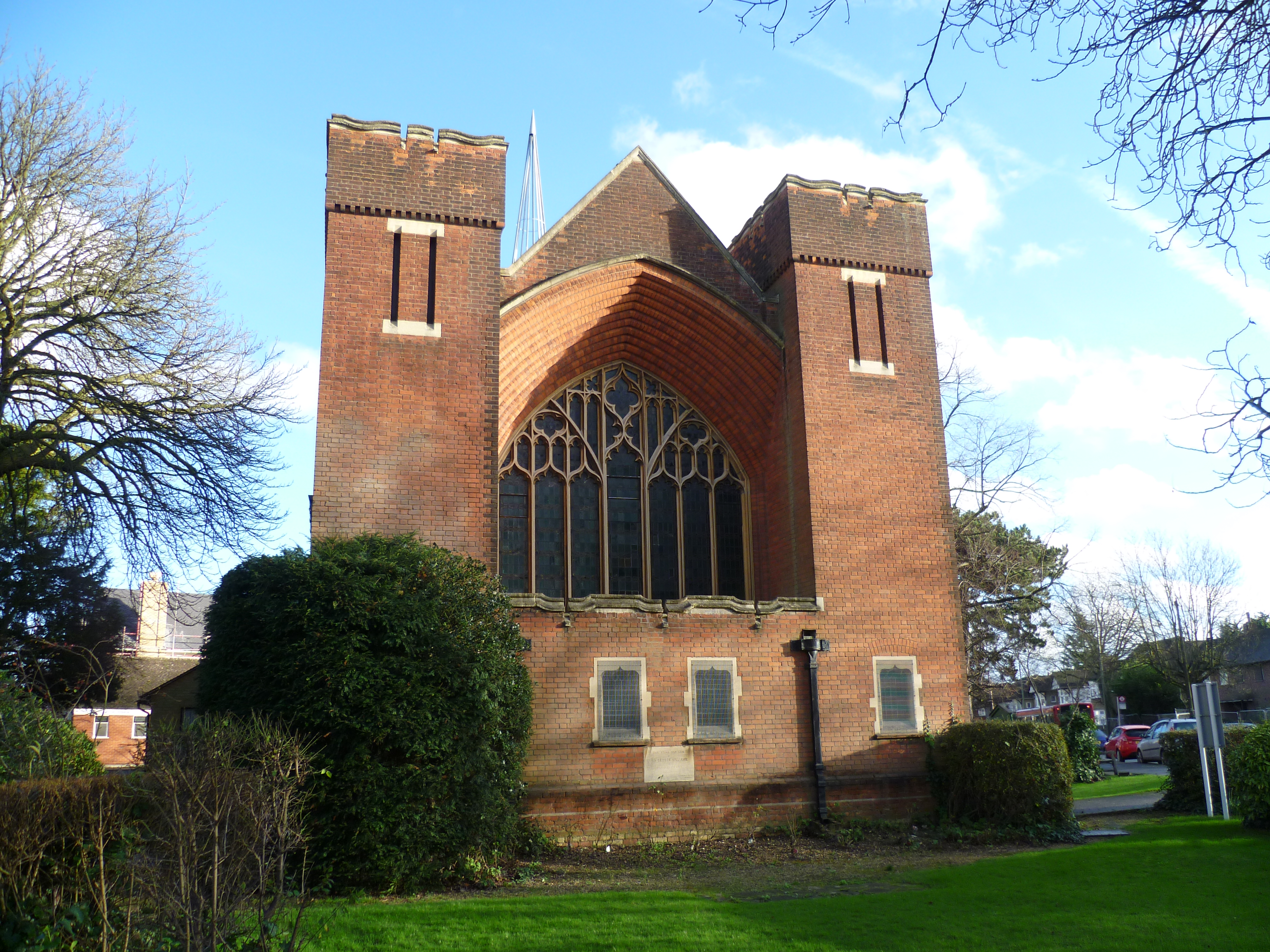
Christ Church at Whetstone

Christ Church at Whetstone was a United Reformed Church in Whetstone, north London. It was founded before 1788 and closed in 2020. Christ Church at Whetstone United Reformed Church has its origins in independent meetings first held in Whetstone in 1788. In 1817 the meetings were moved to Totteridge where at first the congregation met in private houses. A permanent chapel with adjacent school room were constructed on Totteridge Lane in 1827, named the 'Totteridge Lane Chapel'.

In 1884 it was agreed that the church should move to the developing residential area of Oakleigh Park, Whetstone, and a plot of land was duly purchased. A new church and school were built and opened in 1888, with the name 'Whetstone Congregational Church, Oakleigh Park'. In 1900 the church was gutted by a fire. It was decided to convert the damaged church into a hall, and build a new church and school room.

In 1972 the Congregational Church merged with the Presbyterian Church to form the United Reformed Church, and the Whetstone church accordingly changed its name to 'The United Reformed Church, Whetstone'. Extensive rebuilding work was undertaken in 1975 - 1976, including the construction of a new church and a block of flats. In 1979 the name 'Christ Church at Whetstone United Reformed Church, Oakleigh Park' was adopted.

The church had a small Victorian pipe organ, built in 1880 by Henry Jones. After the church's closure in 2020, the organ, nicknamed "Henry" was relocated to London Bridge station by a charity project Pipe Up for Pipe Organs.
