= London Bridge station organ =

Public pipe organ in London, England

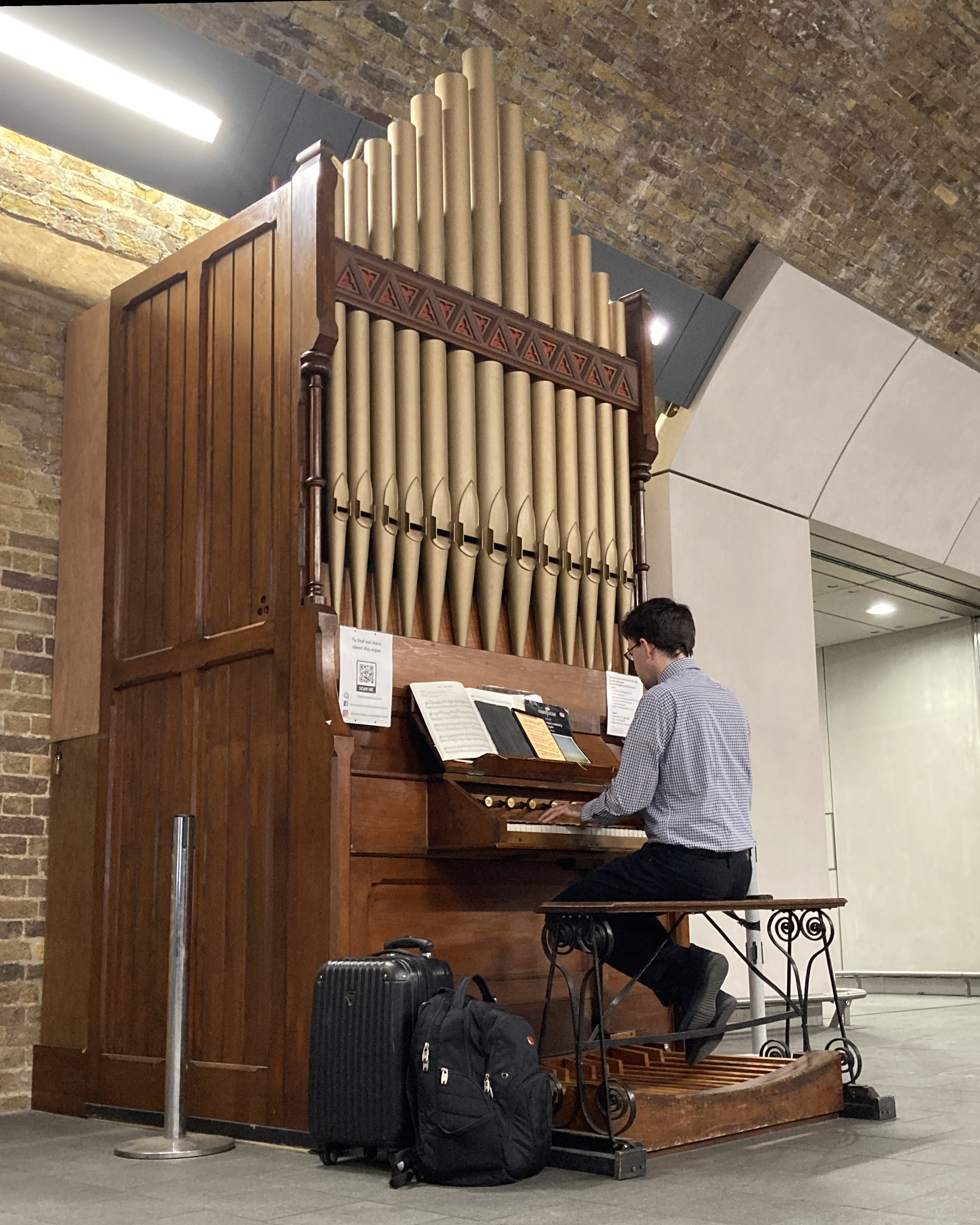
The organ at London Bridge station following its relocation in 2022

The London Bridge station pipe organ, popularly known as Henry, is a Victorian pipe organ located at London Bridge station in London, England. Originally built in 1880 by Henry Jones for Christ Church at Whetstone, it was moved to its current location for public use in 2022 by the Pipe Up for Pipe Organs charity project which recovered the organ from the church following its closure in 2020. It bears one manual with fifty-six notes spanning from C to g''', a pedalboard from C to f', and five stops.

== History ==
=== Description ===
The organ was built by Henry Jones in 1880, and later namesaked Henry after him. Its casing is in a typical 'small' style for its period. The console has one manual, a pedal keyboard and five flue stops (one divided in bass and treble), four for the manual and one on the pedal, and its electric blower has a thirty-minute switch. It has a swell pedal which operates using a ratchet rod under an expressive manual.

The console is attached directly to the tracker instrument. Its pedalboard is in a straight concave. The organist sits on a wrought iron-framed bench, which is chained directly to the pedalboard to prevent theft. Some of the instrument's pipes are visible: the side of the instrument are the low C to low E pipes of the Pedal's Bourdon 16', and the bottom octave of the Open Diapason 8' are mounted in its façade.

The organ was installed at Christ Church, a United Reformed church in Whetstone, north London, where it remained in use until the church closed in July 2020. It was removed the following year.

=== Public use ===
In July 2022 the organ was installed at London Bridge station (in the Stainer Street concourse near Saint Thomas Street) by organ restorer Martin Renshaw's charity project, Pipe Up for Pipe Organs. Its relocation preserved the instrument and helped to raise public awareness of the loss of pipe organs from closed churches in the United Kingdom. It is freely available for anyone to play for thirty minutes at a time, upon which its blower must be reactivated. The Future for Religious Heritage organisation believes it to be the 'world's first open-access railway station pipe organ'.

Pipe Up for Pipe Organs estimate that of the approximately 35,000 pipe organs in the United Kingdom, "up to four pipe organs a week are being stripped out and sent to rubbish tips". The charity relocates British pipe organs to France, the Netherlands, Switzerland, Denmark, Norway and Eastern Europe.

Another organ, nicknamed James, was moved by the project together with the London Mozart Players to Trinity Court in Whitgift Centre, a shopping centre in Croydon, south London.

== Disposition ==
=== Manual (C-g''') ===
- Rohr Flöte 8'
- Open Diapason (Front and Treble) 8'
- Gamba 8'
- Principal 4'

=== Pedal (C-f') ===
- Bourdon 16'
- Manual to Pedal coupler

== Reception ==
Following the organ's relocation to London Bridge station in July 2022, a ceremony was held on 27 October 2022 to mark its installation. The event was attended by the chair of Network Rail, Peter Hendy; organist Anna Lapwood, Director of Music at Pembroke College, Cambridge, gave a performance. Organists and Network Rail officials cited the positive reaction they observed from the public.

Lapwood's September 2022 performance of "God Save the King", accompanying a security guard who turned out to be a trained singer, had previously gone viral on Twitter. In 2023, David Hill, the former organist and music director at Westminster Cathedral, Winchester Cathedral and St John's College, Cambridge, performed Bach's Toccata in D minor on the organ.

== See also ==
- Public piano
