= Terlincthun British Cemetery =

War Cemetery

- Commonwealth War Graves Commission
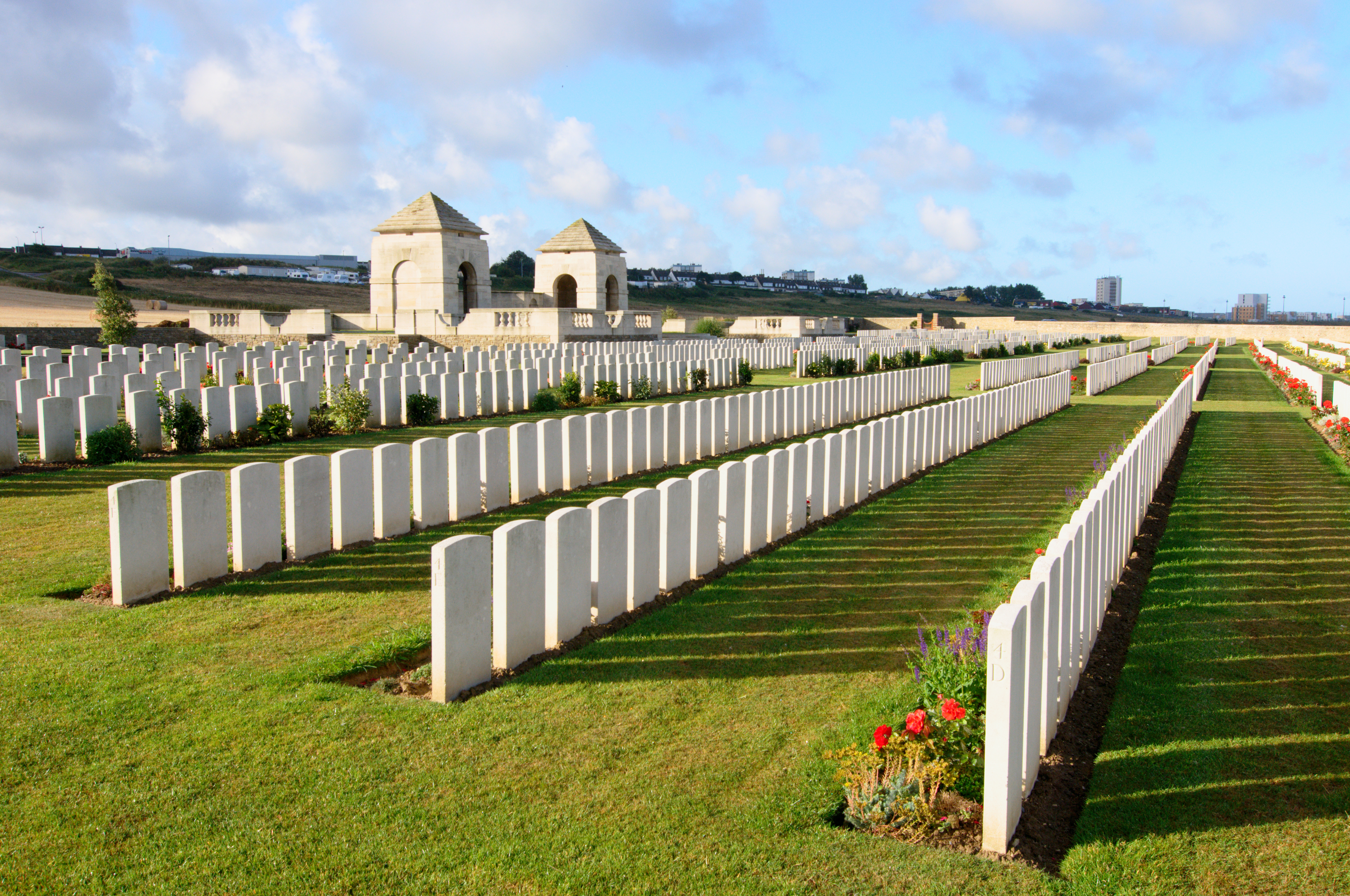
- Terlincthun British Cemetery
- Used for those deceased 1914-1918, 1939-1945
- Established: June 1918
- Location: 50.74484°N 1.61153°E; Wimille, Boulogne, Hauts-de-France
- Designed by: Sir Herbert Baker; Gordon Leith
- Total burials: 4,378

Burials by nation
- First World War: United Kingdom: 3,103; Canada: 298; German Empire: 189; Australia: 91; South Africa: 42; New Zealand: 31; Russian Empire: 4; United States: 3; India: 1; Second World War: United Kingdom: 98; Australia: 14; India: 4; South Africa: 42

Burials by war
- First World War: 3,673 Second World War: 117

Terlincthun British Cemetery is a Commonwealth War Graves Commission military cemetery containing Commonwealth and German burials from the First and Second World Wars, located in the French region of Hauts-de-France.

The Cemetery is located 1.6 miles (2.6 km) south-west of Wimille and 1.2 miles (1.9 km) north of Boulogne-sur-Mer.

== History ==
During the First World War, many British base hospitals were set up in the locality of Boulogne and Wimereux. The cemetery at Terlincthun began when burials for casualties who died in these hospitals exhausted the civil cemeteries in the nearby towns.

After 1920, many burials were centralised from other places along the Western Front at places such as Terlincthun.

During the Second World War, many British soldiers were buried in Terlincthun after the fierce fighting in Boulogne with further casualties added after engagements close to Wimille in 1944.

== Location ==
Terlincthun Cemetery can be reached from both Boulogne and Calais by following the D96E road towards Wimereux and turning off on St. Martin's Road.

== Notable burials ==
- 2Lt. John H. Paterson (1890–1918) British officer executed for desertion and murder.
- Major Arthur W. Keen MC (1895–1918), flying ace and commander of No. 40 Squadron RAF.
- Major Hugh Wake (d.1914), the only First World War Indian Army burial in Terlincthun.
