= Villa d'Este, Johannesburg =

Building in South Africa

Villa d'Este
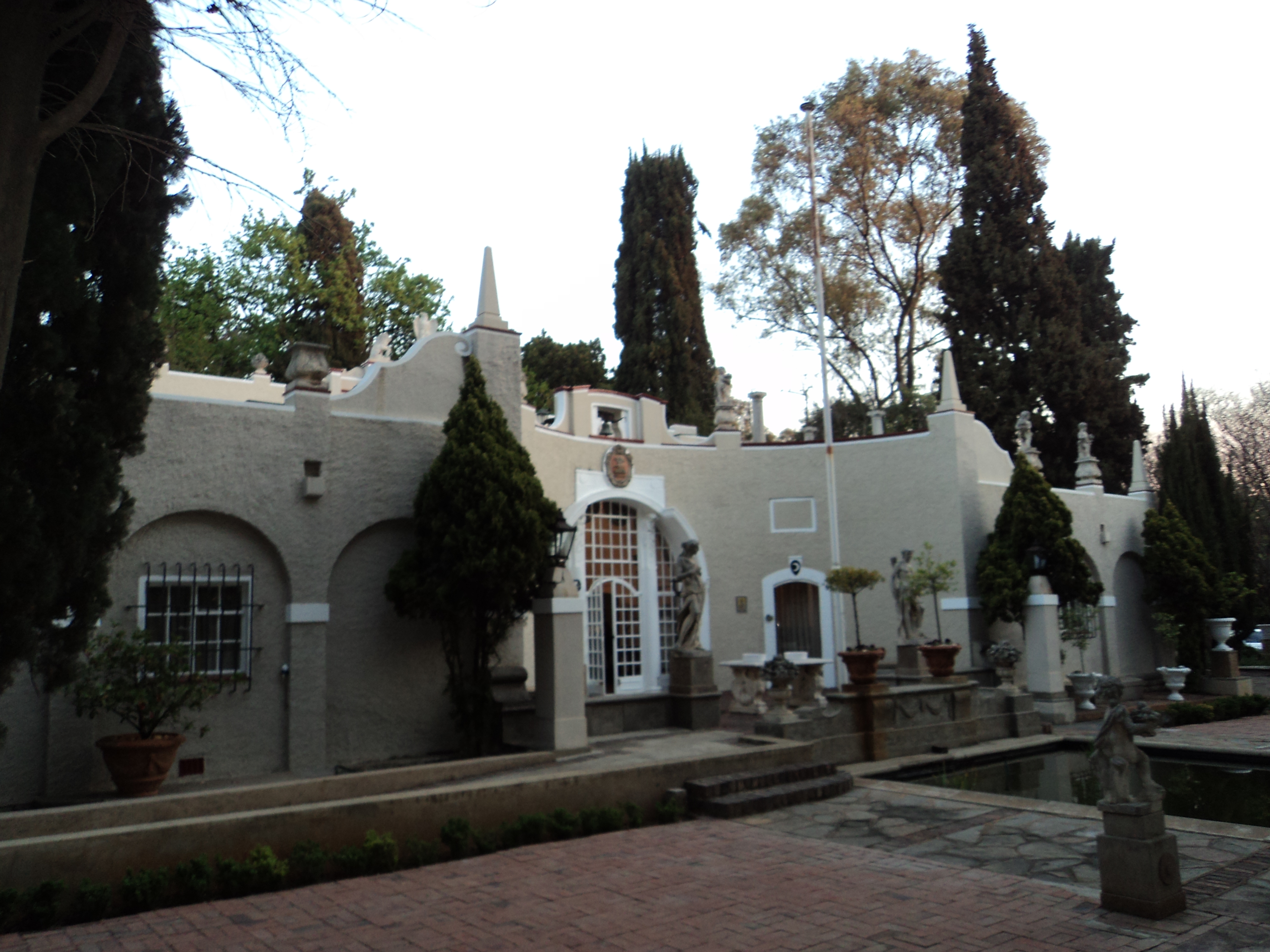
- Villa d'Este in 2014

General information
- Location: South Africa
- Completed: 1923

Design and construction
- Architects: Gordon Leith; David Morrison

Villa d'Este is a National Heritage site in Johannesburg, Gauteng, recognized by the South African Heritage Resource Agency, and on the List of heritage sites in Gauteng. It is located at 82 Jan Smuts Avenue in Saxonwold.

== History ==
The house was designed by architect Gordon Leith in 1923, as a house in Spanish style for the epidemiologist A. J. Orenstein. It was purchased in 1957 by English architect David Morrison (1910–2000), who then spent many years changing the house to a pastiche of an Italian villa with its formal gardens, which reminded the architect of the Villa d'Este at Tivoli near Rome. It has a main pool at the front which is a swimming pool, statues and fountains, and a Jacuzzi and sauna. David Morrison lived in the house until 1993, when it was purchased by an interior designer who had the gardens renovated and replanted with junipers and cypresses. From 2013–2016 it was used as business premises for a health spa.
