= Anna Lapwood =

British organist and choir director (born 1995)

Anna Lapwood MBE FRSCM
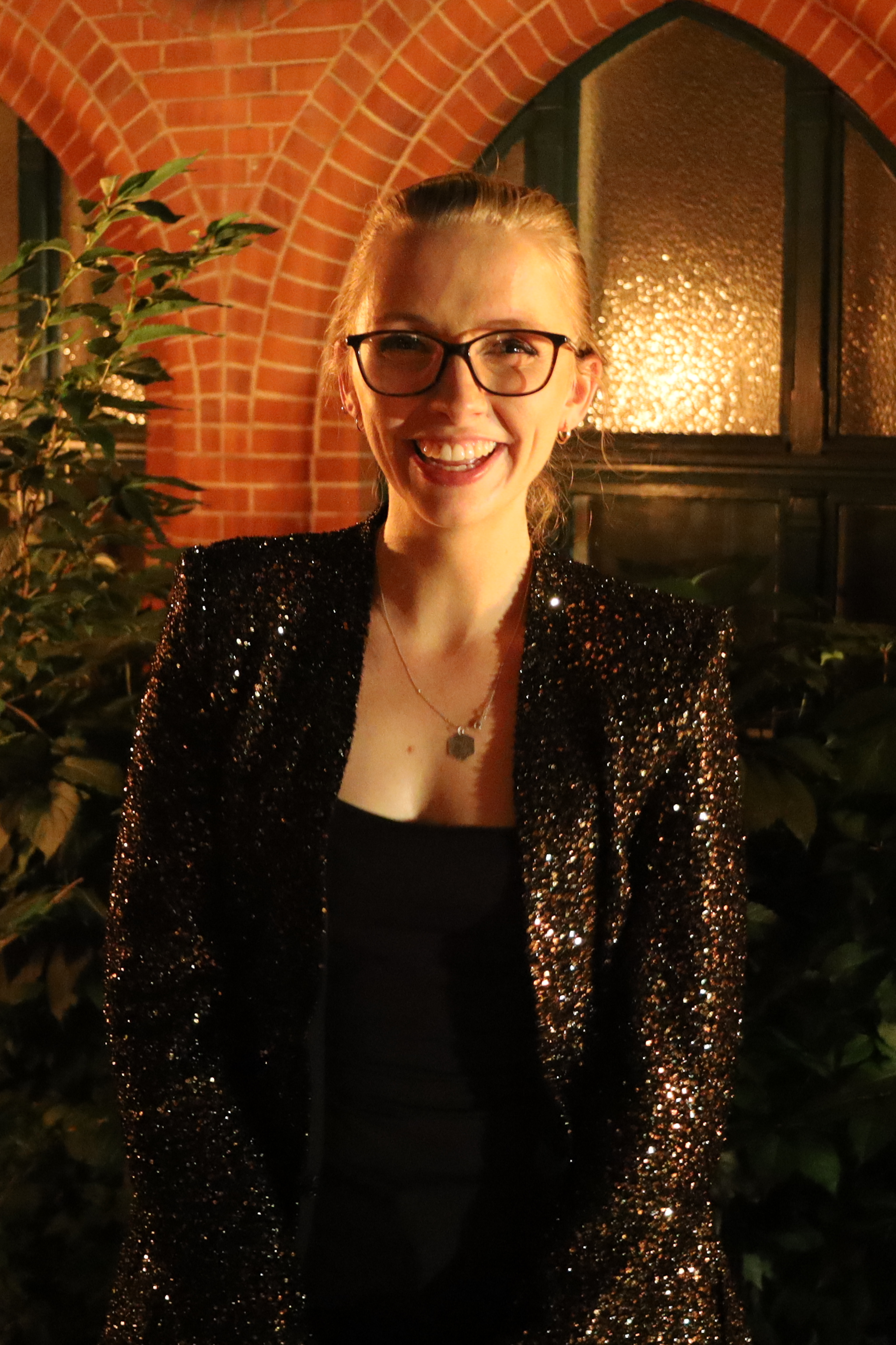
- Lapwood in 2024

Background information
- Born: Anna Ruth Ella Lapwood; 28 July 1995 (age 31); High Wycombe, Buckinghamshire, England
- Occupations: Organist; Choir director Television and radio presenter
- Instruments: Organ
- Labels: Signum, Sony Classical
- Website: annalapwood.co.uk

Anna Ruth Ella Lapwood (born 28 July 1995) is a British organist, choir director, multi-instrumentalist, and television and radio presenter, whose recordings have reached a wide audience on social media since she was appointed as an associate artist at the Royal Albert Hall in London in 2022.

From 2016 to 2025 she was Director of Music at Pembroke College, Cambridge, one of the youngest people to have directed an Oxford or Cambridge college choir. In May 2025 she became the first ever official organist of the Royal Albert Hall.

== Early life and education ==
Lapwood was born in 1995 at High Wycombe, Buckinghamshire. Her father is an Anglican clergyman and teacher, her mother is a paediatric palliative carer.

She studied piano, violin, viola and composition at the Junior Royal Academy of Music and was the principal harpist for the National Youth Orchestra of Great Britain and the Junior Academy Symphony Orchestra. She can play 15 instruments.

After attending Oxford High School, where she played four instruments to grade 8 standard and began playing the organ, Lapwood gained a first-class degree from Magdalen College, Oxford, and was the first woman in the college's 560-year history to be awarded an organ scholarship.

== Career ==
=== Pembroke College, Cambridge (2016−2025) ===
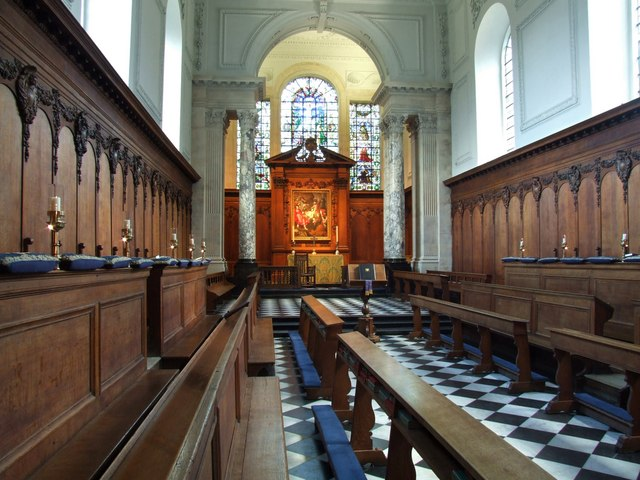
The chapel of Pembroke College, Cambridge, where Lapwood served as Director of Music from 2016 to 2025.

Lapwood was appointed as Director of Music of Pembroke College, Cambridge, in 2016. On appointment she was the youngest person to hold the position of Director of Music at an Oxford or Cambridge university college, taking up the position at the age of 21. As Director of Music, she conducted the chapel choir, and in 2020 she became the youngest Bye-Fellow in the College's history.

In 2018, Lapwood founded the Pembroke College Girls’ Choir for girls from local schools aged 11–18, which performs Evensong weekly during term time. She also ran the annual Cambridge Organ Experience for Girls. She inaugurated the annual Pembroke College Bach-a-thon in 2017, initially to raise funds for Pembroke College Choir's tour to Zambia. In 2018, all of the organists taking part in the Bach-a-thon were female. In 2019, Lapwood established another choir at Pembroke College, designed to teach sight-reading skills to singers.

In 2019, Lapwood and the choirs of Pembroke College appeared on BBC One's show Britain's Christmas Story, presented by Gareth Malone and Karen Gibson.

Lapwood announced in February 2025 that she would leave Pembroke College at the end of the 2024−2025 academic year to pursue her career as a concert organist, having found it increasingly difficult to combine the two roles. She conducted her final Evensong service in the College chapel on 26 June, and her last time conducting as their Director of Music was the “From Dusk Till Dawn” Prom at the BBC Proms

=== Royal Albert Hall (2025−present) ===
In May 2025 Lapwood was named the inaugural official organist of the Royal Albert Hall, having been an associate artist there since 2022. She curated the music for and performed in an all-night Prom there on 8 August 2025.

== Other work ==
=== Recitals and performances ===
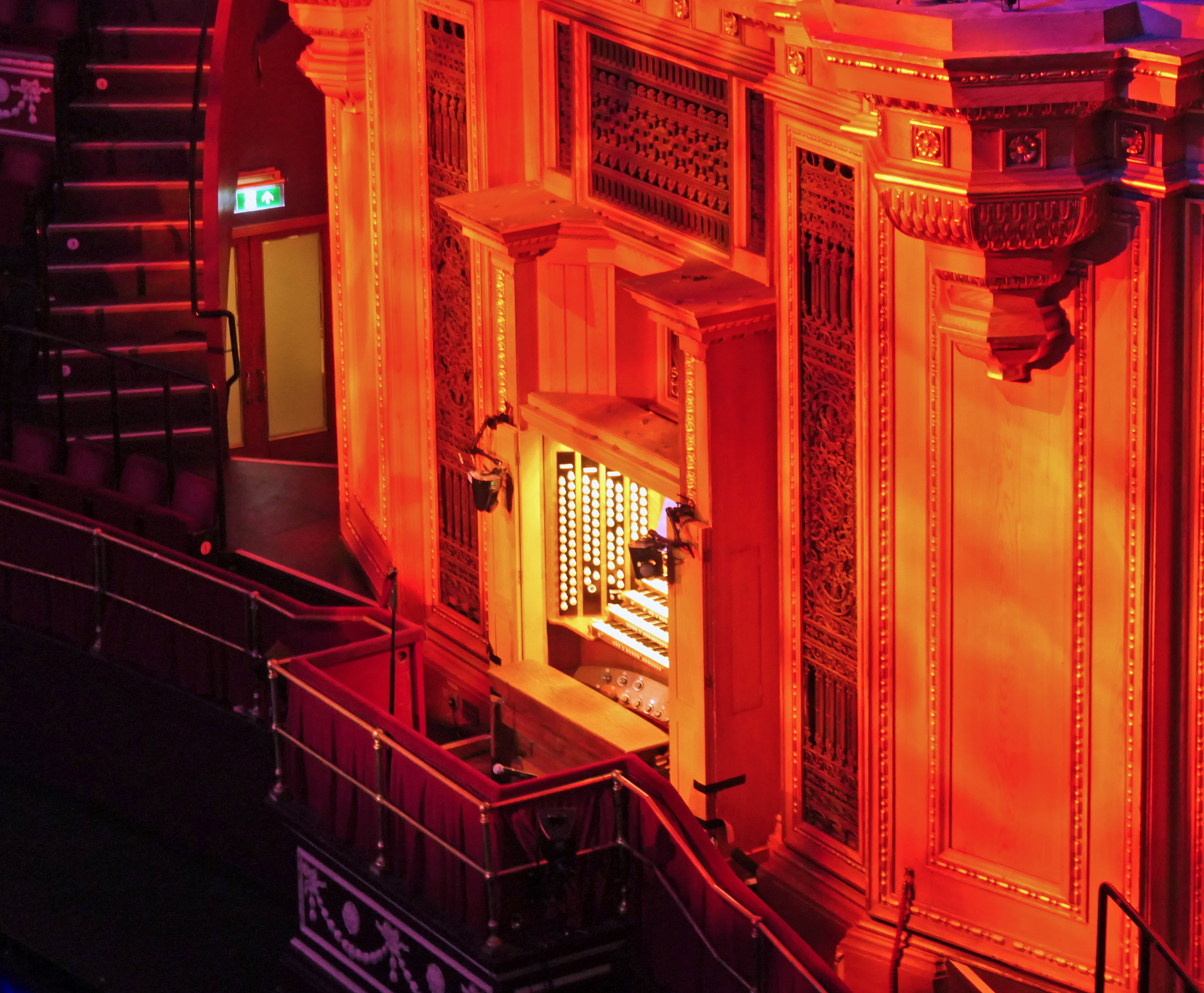
The organ at the Royal Albert Hall in London, where Lapwood is the official organist.

As an organist, Lapwood has performed at the Royal Albert Hall, the Royal Festival Hall and St Thomas Church in New York. In 2019, she opened the Bafta television awards on the organ at the Royal Festival Hall, and she frequently travels around the United Kingdom and Europe on tours.

As a conductor, Lapwood directed the BBC Singers as part of the BBC Inspire Programme. She has led choral workshops in Thailand, Perth, Shenzhen, Shanghai and Lusaka, and regularly works in Zambia through her role as a trustee of The Muze Trust.

As a singer, Lapwood has released two albums as part of Gareth Malone's professional ensemble Voices. With the ensemble, she has performed at the Classical Brit Awards, the Royal Variety Show and the National Eisteddfod of Wales, among other television performances.

In 2022, she was named an ambassador for the Cathedral Music Trust, alongside Alexander Armstrong.

In May 2022, Lapwood was unexpectedly invited to play with the electronic artist Bonobo and his band on their fifth and final night at the Royal Albert Hall. After band members overheard Lapwood rehearsing on the Hall's main organ in the early hours of the morning, the band asked her to join their performance the next day. Eighteen hours later, an organ part had been written especially for Lapwood to accompany Bonobo for the closing show, with an audience of 5,000. The video of the performance became popular on social media platforms, registering more than 5.6 million views on Lapwood's TikTok account. Lapwood later called the experience "genuinely life-changing" and "undoubtedly, the best moment of my life so far". She later played the Hall's organ for 2023 shows by the Ministry of Sound and Raye, and a 2024 live performance by Aurora.

In September 2022, Lapwood played the newly installed pipe organ at London Bridge station, popularly known as "Henry", with her performance of "God Save the King", accompanied by a security guard, going viral on Twitter.

On 15 July 2025, more than 10,000 people lined up to listen to Lapwood's free organ concert at the Cologne Cathedral, a crowd that far exceeded the cathedral's capacity of 3,800. Lapwood spontaneously modified the programme by giving two, shorter concerts to accommodate most of the people.

=== Radio and television presentations ===
As a broadcaster, Lapwood hosted a weekly classical music show on BBC Radio Cambridgeshire from 2018 to 2020, and is a contributor to BBC Radio 3, having appeared on Record Review with Andrew McGregor. Because of her popularity on social media, she has occasionally been referred to as the "TikTok Organist" and uses the hashtag #playlikeagirl.

Lapwood was the main presenter of the televised highlights of the 2020 BBC Young Musician competition, which aired in 2021 due to the global COVID-19 pandemic.

Lapwood has since been seen as a regular TV presenter of the BBC Proms, including presenting the live broadcast of the 2023 first night of the Proms alongside Sandi Toksvig and Clive Myrie. Lapwood played the organ as part of the 2024 Doctor Who Prom during the show's second half.

== Awards and honours ==
Lapwood was appointed a Member of the Order of the British Empire (MBE) in the 2024 New Year Honours for services to music. The following year she became a Fellow of the Royal School of Church Music (FRSCM).

== Discography ==
- Firedove, with the Chapel Choir of Pembroke College, Cambridge, recorded on the organ of Nidaros Cathedral (Sony Classical, 2025)
- The Waiting Sky, with the Girls Choir of Pembroke College, Cambridge (Sony Classical, 2024)
- Midnight Sessions at the Royal Albert Hall, recorded on the organ of the Royal Albert Hall (Sony, 2023)
- Luna (Sony Classical, 2023)
- A Pembroke Christmas, with the Chapel Choir of Pembroke College, Cambridge (Signum Classics, 2022)
- Celestial Dawn, with the Chapel Choir of Pembroke College, Cambridge (Signum Classics, 2022)
- Images, recorded on the organ of Ely Cathedral (Signum Classics, 2021)
- All Things Are Quite Silent, with the Chapel Choir of Pembroke College, Cambridge (Signum Classics, 2020)
- Not All Those Who Wander Are Lost (Sony Classical, 2026)
