= Gordon Leith =

South African architect (1885 - 1965)

- Born: George Esslemont Gordon Leith; 23 May 1886; Knysna, Cape Colony, South Africa
- Died: 14 April 1965 (aged 78); Johannesburg, South Africa
- Resting place: Old Cemetery, Pretoria
- Citizenship: South Africa
- Education: Architectural Association School of Architecture
- Occupation: Architect
- Spouse(s): Ethel Cox; Alma Leith
- Children: 3, including Sally Miall
- Awards: Military Cross; Doctor of Architecture honoris causa
- Projects: Rand Water Board Building; Johannesburg Park Station; Bloemfontein City Hall; Queen Victoria Hospital, Johannesburg

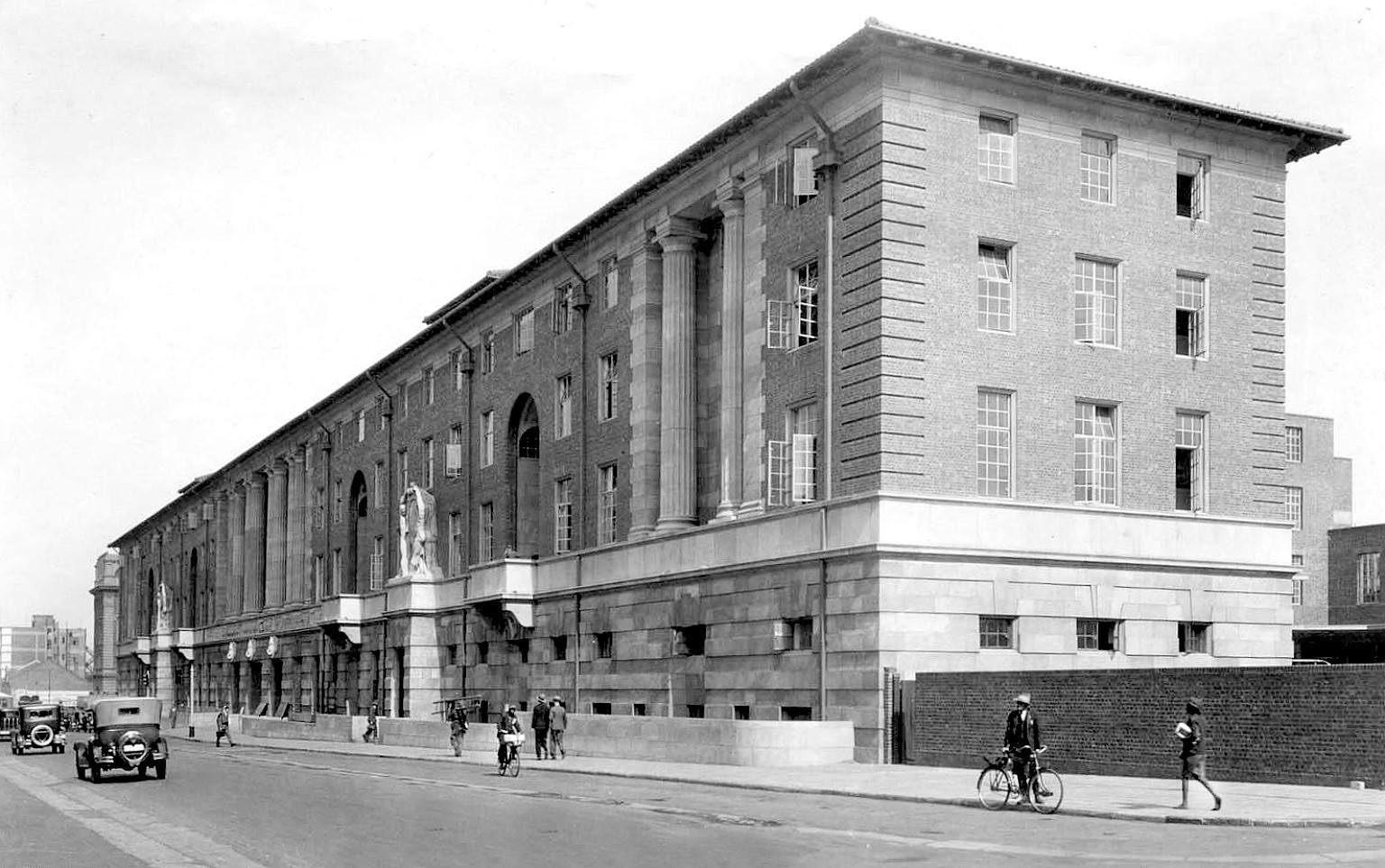
Johannesburg Park Station, 1932

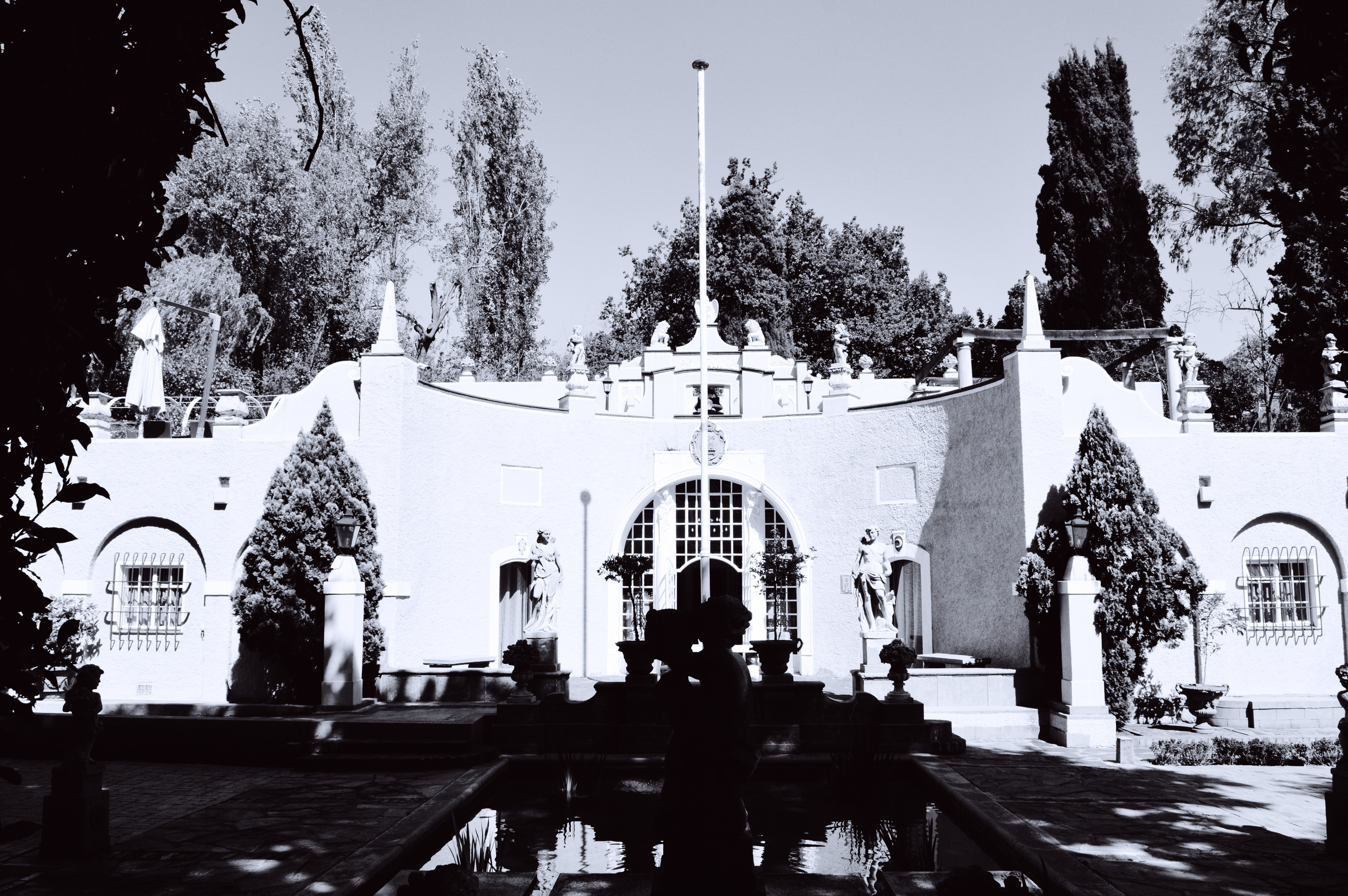
Villa d'Este, Johannesburg

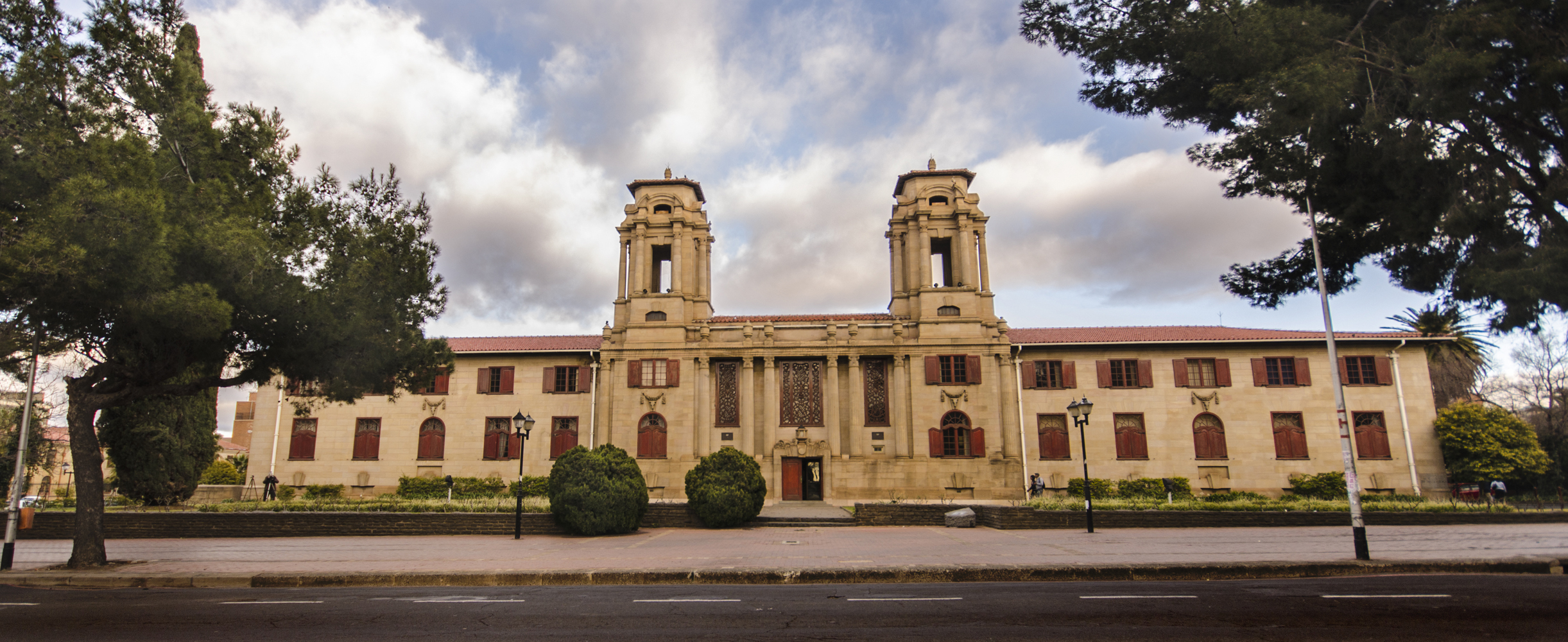
Bloemfontein City Hall

George Esslemont Gordon Leith FRIBA, AADip, Hon. DArch MC (1885–1965) was a South African architect. His work evolved from Edwardian to Modernist, vividly representing stylistic developments typical in architecture during the first half of the 20th century. He is known for his classicist designs of official bodies such as banks, town halls and colleges. In the 1930s, he was among the first South Africans using the 'New Style', before turning to the Modernist form. On Leith's Royal Institute of British Architects application form, Sir Herbert Baker wrote: "He wins golden opinions everywhere for his keenness in the profession and sterling character."

== Early life and education ==
Gordon Leith was born in Knysna, Cape Colony, one of 9 children born to George Leith, a teacher turned lawyer, and his wife, Sarah Clark Scott. The couple had moved from Scotland to South Africa in search of a better climate for George’s health; they eventually settled in Pretoria. Gordon was sent to Staats Model School, where his classmates included Henk Pierneef, Fanie Eloff and Gerard Moerdijk, with whom Leith would work on several projects over their lifetimes. During the Boer War, Leith studied painting under Frans Oerder, violin under Henri ten Brink and drawing and modelling under Anton van Wouw; Leith was the subject of van Wouw's sculpture 'The Art Student'. In 1902, with the war over, he spent a few months as a draughtsman at the Pretoria Railway Workshops until, in 1903, he was given a position on the architectural staff of the Pretoria Public Works Department. He did so well there that his co-workers convinced his parents to send him to London, to the Architectural Association School of Architecture. From 1905 to 1908, he was the school’s top student and qualified with distinction for his Associateship of the Royal Institute of British Architects. In 1909, he returned to Pretoria.

== Career ==
Leith went back to the Pretoria Public Works Department, working under architects Patrick Eagle and James Cormack, and led a team that prepared plans for a large government complex of buildings, including Houses of Parliament. When it was decided that Cape Town would become the legislative capitol of South Africa, and Pretoria its administrative capitol, Sir Herbert Baker was brought in to plan the Pretoria Administrative Buildings, now known as the Union Buildings. Leith joined Baker's staff and, because of his enormous energy and talent, carried out the greater part of the preparation of the sketch plans, perspectives and detail drawings for the project. In 1912, Baker created the Baker Traveling Scholarship, which allowed promising young architects to study abroad and learn about architecture in other cultures. Leith was its first recipient.

From 1912 to 1914, Leith attended the British School at Rome and the British School at Athens. He spent some time in Britain and returned to South Africa in 1915, working with Baker on the drawings for the Secretariats at Delhi and teaching at the South African School of Mines. In 1916, on the recommendation of then-General Jan Smuts, he was commissioned as a Second Lieutenant in the Royal Field Artillery. In the course of battle in France, he exhibited extreme bravery and was promoted to Captain and awarded the Military Cross; he also survived a gas attack and lived the rest of his life with the effects.

After the 1918 peace, at the request of General Smuts, Leith continued to serve in France as Designing Architect under Baker and Sir Edwin Lutyens at the Imperial War Graves Commission. Working from London, he designed Terlincthun British Cemetery and Calais Southern Cemetery and assisted Lutyens on his memorials. But, with his damaged lungs, Leith needed a better climate. He resigned his commission and returned to South Africa, this time settling in Johannesburg.

Leith briefly partnered with architect Theo Schaerer and then established his own practice in an office shared with Jan Breyer. He received enough commissions that he was able to open an office in Pretoria, which was run by his student, Norman Eaton. In Pretoria, he became a part-time lecturer in design, at Transvaal University College. He also helped Geoffrey Eastcott Pearce establish South Africa’s first School of Architecture, which would be incorporated into the University of the Witwatersrand.

After completing the Rand Water Board Building, and winning the competition for the Pretoria Technical College, Leith was occupied with a steady stream of commercial buildings and private homes. In 1933, he was appointed architect of the South African Reserve Bank, and to Barclays Bank in the Transvaal. During the 1930s, he designed several significant buildings, including the Chamber of Mines Hospital and buildings at the Johannesburg General Hospital.

In the 1940s, he built himself two houses in Johannesburg, Harthill and Esselmont; he also had a house at Cairo Farm in Heilbron. In the 1950s, he acted as Advisory Architect to the South African Agency of the War Graves Commission and designed several cemeteries.

Leith was a member of the Association of Transvaal Architects and the Natal Institute of Architects, the South African Institute of Architects and the Free State Institute of Architects. In 1946, the University of the Witwatersrand awarded him an honorary Doctorate in Architecture for his services to Architecture.

== Personal life and death ==
Leith's first wife was Ethel Mary Cox (1888–1974); they wed in England in 1914. They had three daughters and divorced; in 1934, Ethel returned to England with the children. Leith then married a woman known only as Alma Leith. One of his daughters from his first marriage, Sarah Greenaway Leith, eventually known as Sally Miall (1918–2010), became a British rally driver, novelist, and Bletchley Park code-breaker.

Leith was an active member of the Associated Scientific and Technical Club and had a keen interest in water supplies, soil erosion and viticulture. He was a staunch supporter of Jan Smuts and the United National South African Party. He was multi-lingual and a skilled raconteur and mimic, and was well-known for using an Indian motorcycle to zip around Johannesburg to inspect his many building projects.

Leith died shortly before his 78th birthday, following a long period of ill health. He was buried next to his parents in the family plot in the Old Cemetery, Pretoria. On his death, a colleague wrote: "To those who were privileged to know him well the loss of this link with a more measured and humane interval in the social and architectural history of South Africa and the passing of this unique personality who belonged to it is sad indeed."

== Works ==
- Terlincthun British Cemetery, Boulogne-sur-Mer, France, 1919 (assisting)
- Calais Southern Cemetery, Calais, France, 1919 (assisting)
- I.E.M. Cooper House, Johannesburg, 1920
- Dunbar House, Johannesburg, 1920
- Reid Brothers Building, Johannesburg, 1921
- Fernhead House, Johannesburg, 1921
- Currie House, Johannesburg, 1921
- van Soelen House, Johannesburg, 1922
- de Roos House, Johannesburg, 1922
- Gibson House, Johannesburg, 1922
- Villa d'Este, Johannesburg, 1923
- Parkes House, Johannesburg, 1923
- Cenotaph, Germiston, 1924
- Fouché House, Pretoria, 1924
- Everitt House, Johannesburg, 1924
- A.E. Coaker House, Johannesburg, 1924
- C.H. Peach House, Johannesburg, 1924
- Meintjes House, Pretoria, 1924
- Cleeves House, Pretoria, 1925
- Delville Wood Memorial (replica), Pretoria, 1925
- Rand Water Board Building, Johannesburg, 1925
- Third Church of Christ the Scientist, Johannesburg, 1925
- Duncan House, Johannesburg, 1925
- Dutch Reformed Church, Bethal, 1925
- de Villiers House, Blomfontein, 1925
- Premier Biscuit Company, Johannesburg, 1925
- Kennedy House: Kenloch (Kanonklip), Johannesburg, 1925
- St. Columbia’s Presbyterian Church, Johannesburg, 1926
- Premier Milling Building, Johannesburg, 1926
- Christ Scientist Church, Pretoria, 1926
- National Bank of South Africa, Bethal, 1926
- Joubert Building, Johannesburg, 1926
- C.H. Peach House, Durban, 1926
- Presbyterian Church Manse, Johannesburg, 1926
- Ellenberger House, Johannesburg, 1926
- Fouché House, Johannesburg, 1927
- Laing House, Johannesburg, 1927
- Pretoria Technical College, 1927
- Ellis Park Stadium Football Fields, Johannesburg, 1927
- Brinkworth House, Johannesburg, 1927
- Ivan Curlewis House, Pretoria, 1927
- Crosthwaite House, Pretoria, 1927
- Coddington House, Johannesburg, 1927
- National Bank of South Africa, Nelspruit, 1927
- John Orr House, Johannesburg, 1928
- Technical College, Germiston, 1928
- Brunton House, Hermanus, 1928
- Arcadia Mansions, Pretoria, 1928
- Endean House, Johannesburg, 1928
- Firth House, Johannesburg, 1928
- Fleming House, Johannesburg, 1928
- M Anstey House, Johannesburg, 1928
- Searle Memorial Chapel, Great Brak River, 1928
- Rees House: Etunzini, Johannesburg, 1928
- Barclays Bank, Naboomspruit, 1929
- Hope Convalescent Home, Johannesburg, 1929
- Transvaal University College, Pretoria, 1929
- Becker House, Johannesburg, 1929
- Angehrn House, Johannesburg, 1929
- Adams House, Johannesburg, 1929
- Argus Printing & Publishing Co. Building, Johannesburg, 1930
- Hill House, Pretoria, 1930
- Dutch Reformed Church Hall, Vrededorp, 1930
- Technical College, Witbank, 1930
- Technical College, Krugersdorp, 1930
- University of Pretoria Mathematics Building, 1931
- Randfontein Estates Private Hospital, Randfontein, 1932
- Presbyterian Church & Hall, Johannesburg, 1932
- The Star Building, Johannesburg, 1932
- Mayfair Presbyterian Church, Johannesburg, 1932
- Nederduitse Gereformeerde Kerk Vrededorp, Johannesburg, 1932
- Johannesburg Park Station, 1932
- Downing Mansions, Johannesburg, 1932
- The Ridge School, Johannesburg, 1932
- Limulunga Palace, Barotseland, Zambia 1933 (attrib.)
- Leslie Wood House, Benoni, 1933
- Mosenthal House: Montecito, Johannesburg, c 1933
- Nurses' Home, Johannesburg General Hospital, 1933
- Anmercosa House, Johannesburg, 1933
- The Belfast Warehouse, Johannesburg, 1933
- Surrey House, Johannesburg, 1934
- Germiston Town Hall, Germiston, 1934
- Barclays Bank, Germiston, 1934
- Barclays Bank, Pretoria, 1934
- Barclays Bank, Boksburg, 1934
- Barclays Bank, Brakpan, 1934
- Premier Milling Building, Springs, 1934
- Benoni High School, Benoni, 1934
- Dutch Reformed Church, Heilbron, 1934
- Geduld Gold Mine Golf Course, Clubhouse, Geduld, 1934
- Barclays Bank, Cape Town, 1935
- Salisbury House, Johannesburg, 1935
- Brenthurst, Johannesburg, 1935
- Harold Jeppe House, Johannesburg, c 1935
- South African Reserve Bank, East London, c 1935
- Technical College, Springs, 1935
- Technical College, Vereeniging, 1935
- Town Hall, Parys, 1935
- Bloemfontein City Hall, 1936
- Boyd House, Johannesburg, 1936
- M.O.T.H. Cottages, Johannesburg, 1936
- Hugh Solomon Building, Expansion, Johannesburg, 1936
- Deutsche Friedenskirche Parsonage, Johannesburg, 1937
- Chamber of Mines Hospital, Johannesburg, 1937
- Non-European Hospital, Johannesburg, 1937
- Witwatersrand Technical College, Johannesburg, 1938
- South African Reserve Bank, Johannesburg, 1938
- Barclays Bank, Johannesburg, 1938
- Johannesburg General Hospital, 1939
- Queen Victoria Hospital, Johannesburg, 1943
- National Bank of South Africa, Johannesburg, 1953
- Freemason's Hall, Johannesburg, 1957
