= Royal Albert Hall Organ =

Pipe organ in London, England

Coordinates: 51°30′2.59″N 0°10′38.53″W

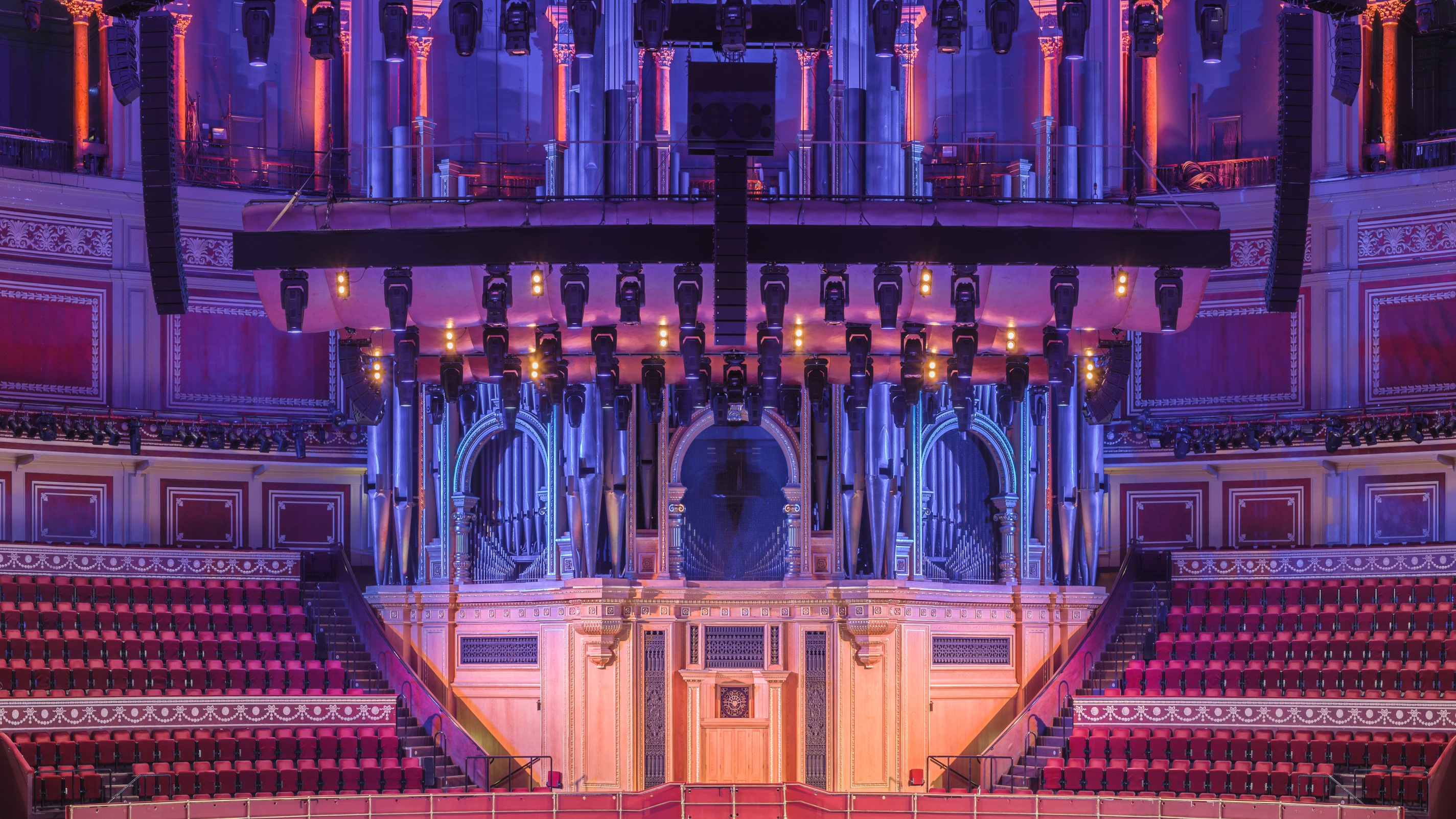
The Grand Organ

The Grand Organ (described by its builder as The Voice of Jupiter) situated in the Royal Albert Hall in London is the second largest pipe organ in the United Kingdom, after the grand organ of Liverpool Cathedral.

It was originally built by Henry "Father" Willis and most recently rebuilt by Mander Organs. It has 147 stops and, since its restoration in 2004, 9,999 pipes. Anna Lapwood has served as the Royal Albert Hall's first official organist since 2025.

== History ==
=== Willis organ ===
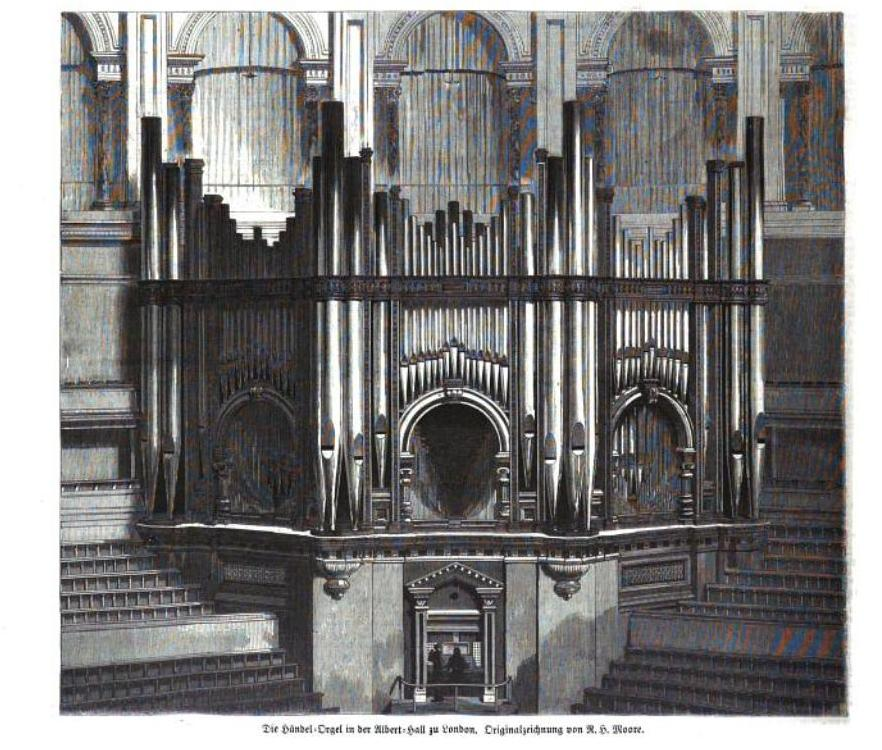
Illustration of the original organ in 1871

The original organ was built by Henry Willis & Sons in 1871. It had four manuals and 111 stops and at that time it was the largest in the world.

=== Harrison and Harrison organ ===
The Durham firm of Harrison & Harrison rebuilt the organ in two stages in 1924 and 1933. The organ was extended to 146 stops (including three percussion stops) and converted to electro-pneumatic action. It was still the largest organ in Britain at that time. The 2014 Pink Floyd album The Endless River, includes a track, "Autumn '68", featuring band member Richard Wright playing the organ in 1969. The recording was made on the afternoon before a Pink Floyd concert at the hall. "Rick asked could he have a go on this great big pipe organ that was built in. So we set him up, set up a couple of mics up and recorded him playing, just jamming away on his own", fellow band member David Gilmour later recalled.

In the 1970s, Harrisons refurbished the console and replaced the switchgear in the action, made minor changes to the voicing and added a roof in an unsuccessful attempt to project the sound forward. Composer Wendy Carlos featured the organ during the closing title sequence of the 1982 Disney science fiction film Tron, performed by organist Martin Neary.

By the end of the 20th century, the organ was again in a state of disrepair, with a number of stops unusable due to leaks in the wind system, cracks in the soundboards, and other problems. By 2002, it was maintained only through "heroic efforts" on the part of Harrisons and could not be used at all without their staff present, in case of mishap. The wind chests and pipes were leaking noisily and wind pressure was insufficient to support full use. The leatherwork in the actions was also failing.

=== Mander rebuild ===
In 2002, the organ was taken out of commission for an extensive rebuild by Mander Organs. Some consideration was given to restoring the organ to its original Willis specification, but the subsequent alterations and enlargements had made this impractical and it was felt that it should remain essentially as-is.

The dryness of the Hall had damaged the soundboards, so these were replaced and new and larger wind trunks provided. The roof was removed, and the reed stops in the Great division were restored to their 1924 wind pressures. The 1970s split of the Great Organ (allowing two independent Great Organs to be registered and played simultaneously on different manuals) was rationalised, effectively offering separate Willis and Harrison choruses; also a Fourniture IV was added, bringing the total to 147 stops and 9,997 speaking pipes. For a few years the organ was once again the largest in the UK, until in 2007 the distinction passed to the organ in Liverpool Anglican Cathedral (10,268 pipes).

The organ was re-opened at a gala concert on the evening of 26 June 2004 with David Briggs, John Scott and Thomas Trotter playing, with the Royal Philharmonic Orchestra under Richard Hickox. The organ featured prominently in the 2004 BBC Proms series. The first recordings on the newly rebuilt instrument were by Dame Gillian Weir.

The instrument has been used by progressive rock band Muse when playing Megalomania, originally recorded on another Willis organ, at the church of Saint Mary in Bathwick. During a live performance at the Royal Albert Hall on 12 April 2008 during the band's Black Holes and Revelations Tour, Muse's frontman Matt Bellamy had commented that "since we're here, it would be rude not to play this beast". Organist Anna Lapwood played the organ during live performances by Bonobo and Aurora and a show by the Ministry of Sound.

== Official organists ==
It was not until 2025 that the Royal Albert Hall appointed its first official organist, with Anna Lapwood, who had been an associate artist at the Hall since 2022, taking on the role.

== Notable recordings ==
In 2020, during the COVID-19 lockdowns, the organ was sampled by a recording team led by film composer James Everingham. Microphones were placed around the auditorium, including a binaural microphone placed inside the royal box. These recordings were then edited and developed such that composers can play the pre-registered organ as a virtual instrument within a digital audio workstation, using the Native Instruments Kontakt platform. Royal Albert Hall Organ was publicly released on 5 April 2022.

== Stoplist since 2004 ==
**I Choir and Orchestral Organ** C–c^{4}
	First Division (Choir) unenclosed:
37	Open Diapason	8′ (Note: The character ′ stands for "foot"; one foot is 0.3048 m.)
38	Lieblich Gedeckt	8′
39	Dulciana	8′
40	Gemshorn	4′
41	Lieblich Flute	4′
42	Nazard	2^{2}/_{3}′ (Note: Harrison & Harrison 1974.)
43	Flageolet	2′
44	Tierce	1^{3}/_{5}′
45	Mixture 15.19.22	III
46	**Trumpet**	**8′**
47	**Clarion**	**4′**
	Second Division (Orchestral) enclosed:
48	Contra Viole	16′
49	Violoncello	8′
50	Viole d’Orchestre I	8′
51	Viole d’Orchestre II	8′
52	Viole Sourdine	8′
53	Violes Celestes II	8′
54	Viole Octaviante	4′
55	Cornet de Violes 12.15.17.19.22	V
56	Quintaton	16′
57	Harmonic Flute	8′
58	Concert Flute	4′
59	Harmonic Piccolo	2′
60	**Double Clarinet**	**16′**
61	**Clarinet**	**8′**
62	**Orchestral Hautboy**	**8′**
63	**Cor Anglais**	**8′**
VI	Tremulant

**II Great Organ** C–c^{4}
64	Contra Violone	32′
65	Contra Gamba	16′ (Note: Cf. XIII. Great Second Division on Choir.)
66	Double Open Diapason	16′
67	Double Claribel Flute	16′
68	Bourdon	16′
69	Open Diapason 1	8′
70	Open Diapason 2	8′
71	Open Diapason 3	8′
72	Open Diapason 4	8′
73	Open Diapason 5	8′
74	Geigen	8′
75	Hohl Flute	8′
76	Viola da Gamba	8′
77	Rohr Flute	8′
78	Quint	5^{1}/_{3}′
79	Octave	4′
80	Principal	4′
81	Viola	4′
82	Harmonic Flute	4′
83	Octave Quint	2^{2}/_{3}′
84	Super Octave	2′
85	Fifteenth	2′
86	Mixture 8.12.15.19.22	V
87	Harmonics 10.15.17.19.21.22	VI
88	Fourniture 19.22.26.29	IV
89	Cymbale 19.22.26.29.31.33.36	VII
90	**Contra Tromba**	**16′**
91	**Tromba**	**8′**
92	**Octave Tromba**	**4′**
93	**Posaune**	**8′**
94	**Harmonic Trumpet**	**8′**
95	**Harmonic Clarion**	**4′**

**III Swell Organ** C–c^{4}
96	Double Open Diapason	16′
97	Bourdon	16′
98	Open Diapason	8′
99	Viola da Gamba	8′
100	Salicional	8′
101	Vox Angelica	8′
102	Flûte à Cheminée	8′
103	Claribel Flute	8′
104	Principal	4′
105	Viola	4′
106	Harmonic Flute	4′
107	Octave Quint	2^{2}/_{3}′
108	Super Octave	2′
109	Harmonic Piccolo	2′
110	Mixture 8.12.15.19.22	V
111	Fourniture 15.19.22.26.29	V
112	**Contra Oboe**	**16′**
113	**Oboe**	**8′**
114	**Baryton**	**16′**
115	**Vox Humana**	**8′**
XVII	Tremulant
116	**Double Trumpet**	**16′**
117	**Trumpet**	**8′**
118	**Clarion**	**4′**
119	**Tuba**	**8′**
120	**Tuba Clarion**	**4′**

**IV Solo and Bombard Organ** C–c^{4}
	First Division (Solo) enclosed:
121	Contra Bass	16′
122	Flûte à Pavillon	8′
123	Viole d’Amour	8′
124	Doppel Flute	8′
125	Harmonic Claribel Flute	8′
126	Unda Maris II	8′
127	Wald Flute	4′
128	Flauto Traverso	4′
129	Piccolo Traverso	2′
130	**Double Bassoon**	**16′**
131	**Corno di Bassetto**	**8′**
132	**Hautboy**	**8′**
133	**Bassoon**	**8′**
XX	Tremulant
134	**Double Horn**	**16′**
135	**French Horn**	**8′**
136	**#Carillons**
137	**#Tubular Bells**
	**Second Division (Bombard)**; **138-144 enclosed in Solo box**
138	**Bombardon**	**16′**
139	**Tuba**	**8′**
140	**Orchestral Trumpet**	**8′**
141	**Cornopean**	**8′**
142	**Quint Trumpet**	**5^{1}/_{3}′**
143	**Orchestral Clarion**	**4′**
144	Sesquialtera12.15.17.19.22	V
145	**Contra Tuba**	**16′**
146	**Tuba Mirabilis**	**8′**
147	**Tuba Clarion**	**4′**

**Pedal** C–f^{1}
1	Acoustic Bass (from 7)	64′
2	Double Open Wood (from 7)	32′
3	Double Open Diapason (from 9)	32′
4	Contra Violone (from 64)	32′
5	Double Quint (from 9)	21^{1}/_{3}′
6	Open Wood I	16′
7	Open Wood II	16′
8	Open Diapason I	16′
9	Open Diapason II	16′
10	Violone	16′
11	Sub Bass	16′
12	Salicional	16′
13	Viole (from 48)	16′
14	Quint	10^{2}/_{3}′
15	Octave Wood (from 6)	8′
16	Principal (from 8)	8′
17	Violoncello	8′
18	Flute	8′
19	Octave Quint	5^{1}/_{3}′
20	Super Octave	4′
21	Harmonics 10.12.15.17.19.21.22	VII
22	Mixture 15.19.22.26.29	V
23	**Double Ophicleide** (from 25)	**32′**
24	**Double Trombone** (from 27 in Swell)	**32′**
25	**Ophicleide**	**16′**
26	**Bombard**	**16′**
27	**Trombone** (in Swell)	**16′**
28	**Fagotto**	**16′**
29	**Trumpet** (from 116)	**16′**
30	**Clarinet** (from 60)	**16′**
31	**Bassoon** (from 130)	**16′**
32	**Quint Trombone**	**10^{2}/_{3}′**
33	**Posaune** (from 25)	**8′**
34	**Clarion**	**8′**
35	**Octave Posaune** (from 25)	**4′**
36	**#Bass Drum**

- Couplers: I Choir to Pedal, II Great to Pedal, III Swell to Pedal, IV Solo to Pedal, V Choir (unenclosed) on Solo, VII Octave Orchestral, VIII Sub Octave Second Division (Orchestral), IX Unison off, X Swell to Choir, XI Solo to Choir, XII Reeds on Choir, XIII Great Second Division on Choir, XIV Choir to Great, XV Swell to Great, XVI Solo to Great, XVIII Octave (16′, 8′, 4′ stops only), XIX Solo to Swell, XXI Octave, XXII Sub Octave, XXIII Unison off, XXIV Octave Bombard (16′, 8′, 4′ stops only), XXV Bombard on Choir, XXVI Tubas on Choir.

Annotations

Reed stops are in boldface.
