= Bloemfontein City Hall =

Government building in South Africa

- Bloemfontein-stadsaal
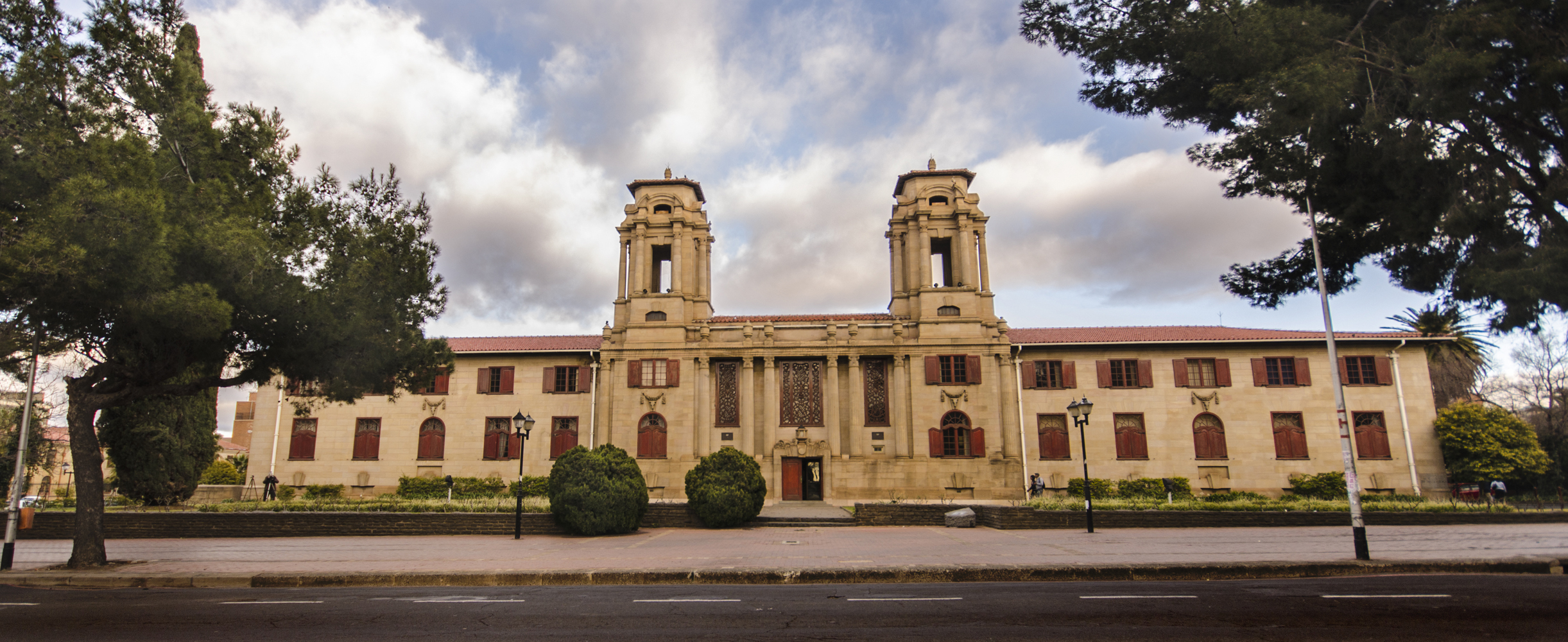
- Bloemfontein City Hall in 2013
- Click on the map for a fullscreen view

General information
- Location: Bloemfontein, South Africa
- Coordinates: 29°06′50.62″S 26°13′00.17″E

Design and construction
- Architect(s): Gordon Leith

Bloemfontein City Hall (Afrikaans: Stadhuis van Bloemfontein or Bloemfontein-stadsaal) is a historic building in Bloemfontein which houses the local city council. The building was completed in 1936 and burned by protestors in 2017.

== History ==
Construction work started in 1934 and was completed in 1936. The building was designed by architect Gordon Leith. During the 1980s, new municipal offices were opened alongside the building. Even after municipal government changes in 2000 and its 2011 reclassification, the local government has continued to use the town hall.

On June 21, 2017, vandals set the building on fire. The fire was lit during a protest by the South African Municipal Workers' Union held at the building earlier in the day. The municipal archives in the building were lost in the fire.

Following a restoration project, Bloemfontein City Hall was reopened in 2021. In order to restore the building to how it was, project leaders had to import material from other countries, such as roofing from Italy.

== Description ==
The city hall lies on President Brand Street next to the Supreme Court of Appeal of South Africa and faces Hertzog Square.

The building is a double-storey sandstone structure. The city hall has a large room, the council meeting room, behind its eastern entrance. The entrance on President Brand Street is designed symmetrically with two towers. Pillars give the east entrance neoclassical elements. Over the symmetrical entrance hang signs indicating Stadhuis and City Hall. Above these lie the former city coat of arms.

== Gallery ==
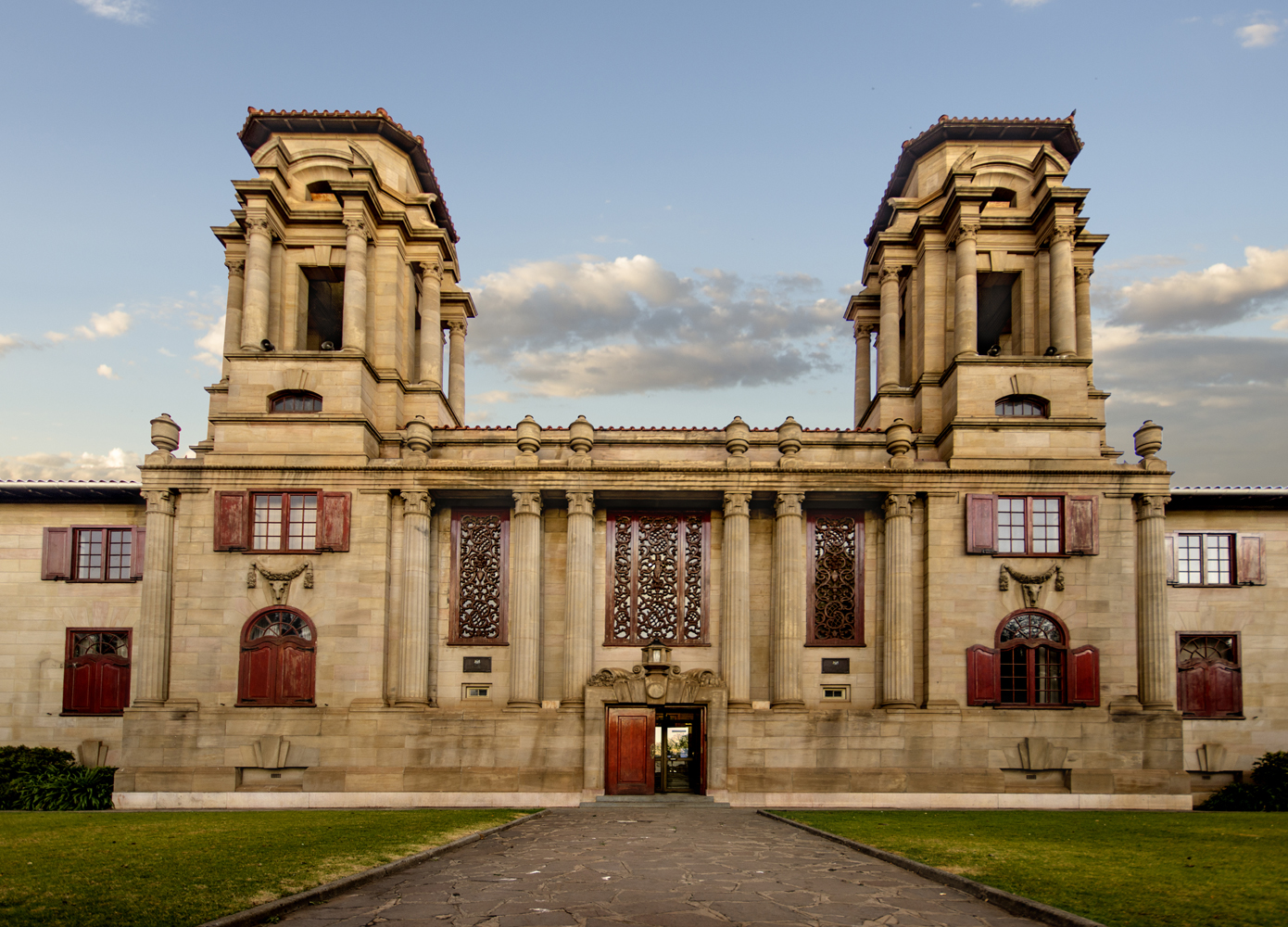

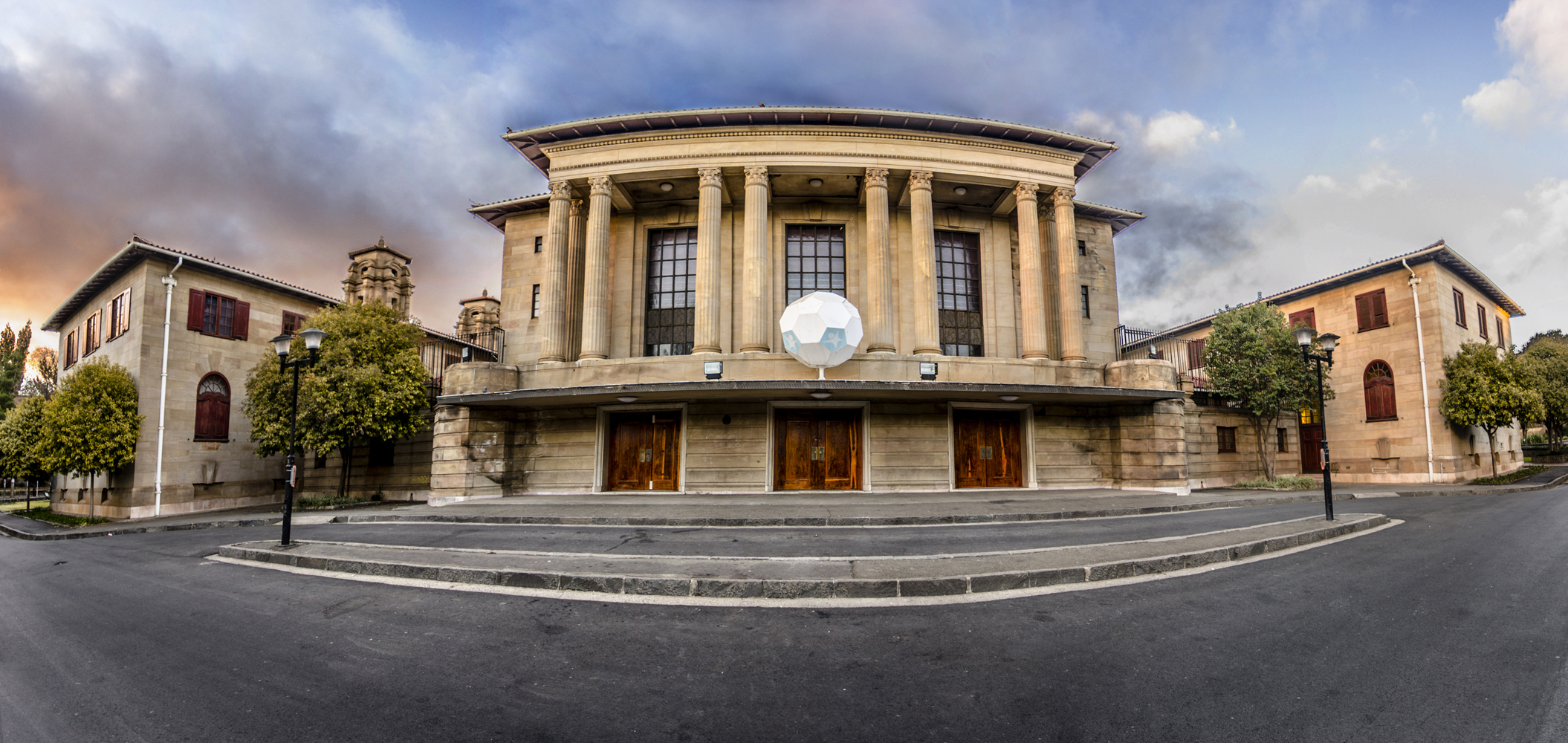

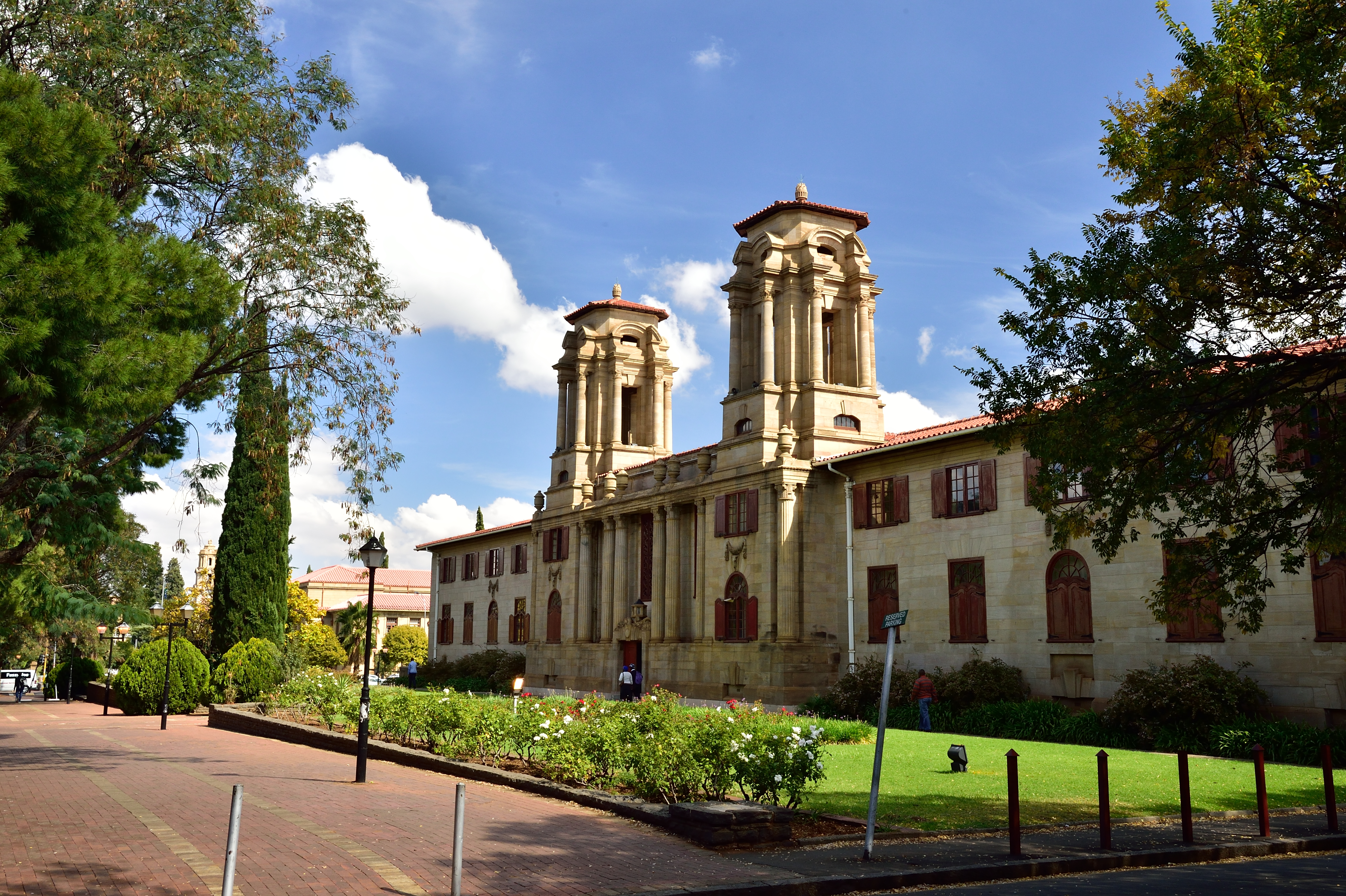

== See also ==
- List of heritage sites in Free State
