= Queen Victoria Hospital (Johannesburg) =

Defunct hospital in Johannesburg, South Africa

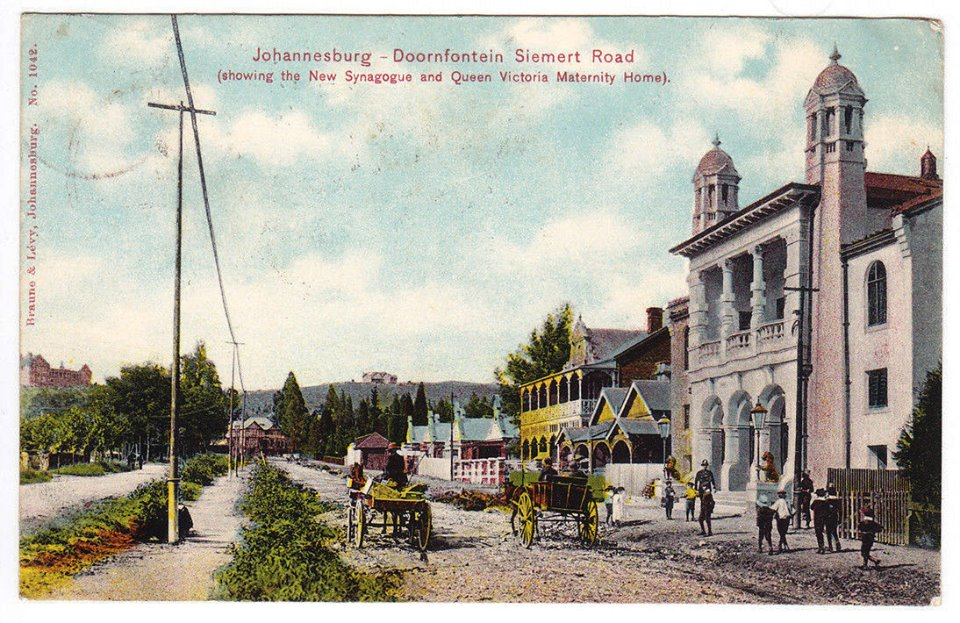
Johannesburg - Doornfontein Siemert Road (showing the New Synagogue and Queen Victoria Maternity Home)

The Queen Victoria Hospital, Queen Victoria Maternity Hospital or Queen Victoria Maternity Home is a defunct hospital that operated in Johannesburg starting in 1904.

== History ==
The first Queen Victoria Hospital building was designed by Allen Wilson and could accommodate 50 patients. It was built in 1904 on Siemert Road and administered by the Guild of Loyal Woman. In 1906, it moved to Milner Park.

In 1913 it became a branch of the Johannesburg Hospital. In 1943 a new building was built on Sam Hancock Street, designed by Gordon Leith. The building is standing as of February 2015, although it is no longer in use. When the new Johannesburg Hospital was built, the first block was dedicated to obstetrics and gynaecology, making the Queen Victoria Hospital obsolete. It became a residential building.
