= Noel Mander =

British organ builder (1912–2005)

Noel Percy Mander
- Born: 19 May 1912
- Died: 18 September 2005 (aged 93)
- Known for: Organ maker, founder of N.P Mander Organs

Noel Percy Mander MBE, FSA (19 May 1912 – 18 September 2005) was a British organ builder and founder of the firm N.P Mander later known as Mander Organs Limited.

A native of Crouch, Kent he grew up in south London. After dropping out of school early, he went to work for a publisher before using family contacts to secure a job with organ builder Ivor of Hill, Norman & Beard in the 1930s. Mander started working independently in 1936, and found employment with the diocese of London. With the onset of World War II, Mander, who saw several of his early works destroyed under German bombardments, first became an auxiliary fireman before joining the Royal Artillery in 1940. He was deployed in North Africa and Italy, and wounded in Salerno.

In 1946, he returned to civilian life and resumed his partnership with the diocese of London, restoring several organs damaged during the war. He founded his own company, N.P Mander Limited, later known as Mander Organs, that same year, and married Enid Watson.

During the subsequent years, Mander's craftsmanship gained him wide recognition - as The Guardian's reporter Barry Millington would later write in Mander's obituary, "a reputation (for himself) as a restorer of quality and sensitivity".

His crowning achievement was the rebuilding of the organ in St. Paul's Cathedral, between 1972 and 1977, for which he was appointed in the New Year Honours 1979 as a Member of The Order of the British Empire. Mander retired in 1983 and left his company to his son John.
