= Rand Water Board Building =

Rand Water Board Building (1925)
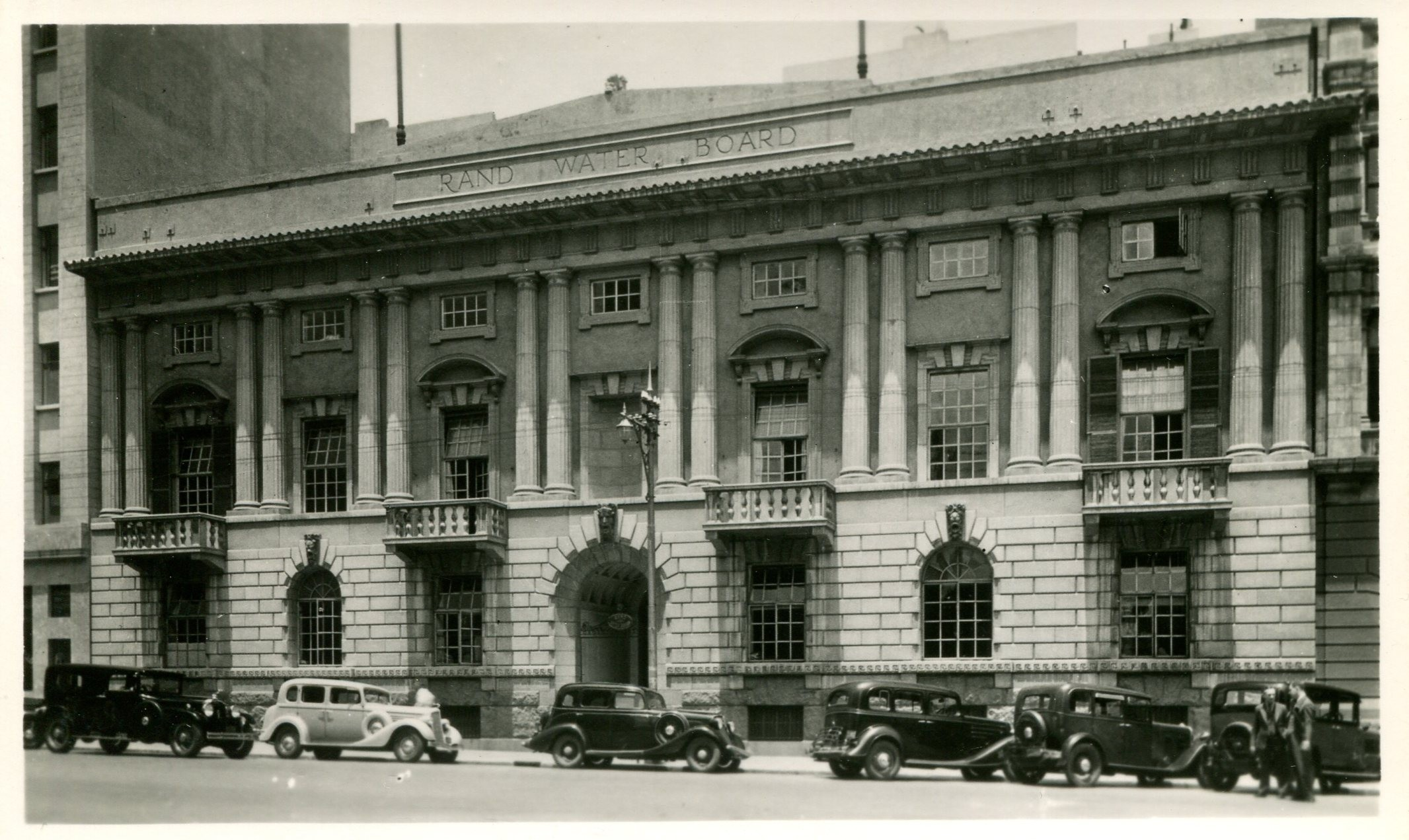
- cnr Market and Fraser Str, Johannesburg

- Location within South Africa

General information
- Status: Demolished
- Type: Business
- Location: Johannesburg, South Africa
- Coordinates: 26°12′11″S 28°2′6″E

Technical details
- Floor count: 3 (basement: 1)

Design and construction
- Architects: Gordon Leith & Partners

The Rand Water Board was established in 1903, tasked with supplying the water needed to support mining activities and sanitary living conditions for those living in the developing urban area of Johannesburg.

The Rand Water Board Building extension to the Fraser Street offices was the third in a series of buildings owned and occupied by the Rand Water Board (RWB) of Johannesburg before the relocation to large purpose built modern premises in Rietvlei.

For clarity, this entry details the history and development of each successive building in chronological order. The original Rand Water Board Building of 1925 has been demolished.

== Building 1: The original Rand Water Board Building, Commissioner Street ==
Since its establishment in 1903, Rand Water Board had always made use of rented accommodation. The first meetings of the board were in fact held at the Rand Hotel. Once the board gave its approval for the undertaking two business stands, numbers 23 and 24, were purchased in Commissioner Street (‘Marshall’s Township’) for £9250.

The Rand Water Board Building was a Neo-Classical building on Commissioner Street designed by the firm of Gordon Leith & Partners in 1925 and built by Messrs Harper Bros. The consulting architect of the project was G.E.G. Leith (1886–1965), a South African-born, but British-trained architect who had worked under Herbert Baker when the Union Buildings were designed at the turn of the century. The new building's design was in the Beaux Arts tradition and it reminded one of the station building in Pretoria – also a Herbert Baker design.

In 1926, the ~8150sqft building was altered by the architects to enhance the facilities for the Rand Water Board. However, by the mid-1930s, it was clear the Board had insufficient office space in the building. It was proposed, at the time, to add an additional floor to the existing building but this idea was soon dismissed in favour of purchasing a suitable site elsewhere in the city for the erection of a new building that would meet the RWB's current and future office accommodation requirements. The organization, in the interim, had to rent additional office space.

New Consolidated Gold Fields Ltd submitted an offer of £75,000 for the original RWB Building in 1939, which was accepted by RWB. This injection of capital allowed the RWB to commence their plans for a new four storey office building on Fraser Street.

== Building 2: The Rand Water Board Building, 3 Fraser Street ==
The chosen site on Fraser Street was at stands 222 and 227, which were formerly the Primrose Buildings. Following negotiations with the owners, RWB successfully bought and demolished the Primrose Buildings to make way for the new offices in 1939 and building work commenced in 1940. The building work was tendered and the winning tender was that of John Barrow (Pty) Ltd for the sum of £103, 328 0s 0d.

The construction was delayed by war-time restrictions on shipping of materials and took two years to complete, and cost £166,785 5s 10d – around £26,000 more than originally estimated. This new building had 20,200sqft, more than double the size of the original Rand Water Building.

Despite this significant increase in office capacity, by 1962 the RWB were again facing office shortages and overcrowding. Again, the Board considered adding additional floors but it was decided this would not fulfill longer-term space requirements. It was consequently decided to investigate the possibility of extending the existing building by purchasing an adjoining site on which a building, linked to the existing building, could be constructed. The RWB bought the New Library Hotel site from The Johannesburg Balmoral Hotel (Pty) Ltd for R195,000.

== Building 3: Extension to the Fraser Street Rand Water Board Building – Custom House ==
The new extension building was erected on stand 4508 in high quality materials – including black granite, marble, hardwood windows, bronze grilles, brown brick – and had its own vehicular access to the basement. The facade of seven bays with a rusticated base, was articulated by decorative key stones to the ground floor. The architects employed specially moulded bricks and deep stone surrounds to add shadow lines and visual interest to the facade. The building has six storeys (including the ground floor) and a basement.

In 1956, the store on the third floor was converted to office space by C P Robinson, Chief Engineer RWB.

In 1964, the RWB removed the accommodation (workers dormitory, dining hall and caretaker's flat) on the fourth floor to create more offices. This alteration was undertaken by Fassler and Howie. At the completion of the alterations and additions to the building, the fourth floor consisted of a cafeteria, kitchen stores and dining room for cleaning staff. The offices of the Superintendent, Buyer and Controller were allocated on the fifth floor as well as those of the Trades Accounts Departments.

Due to a growing number of employees and responsibilities there was a lack of office space and a decision was taken in 1965 by the Rand Water Board to extend it.

It was originally a 5-storey building with a single basement. In February 1965 an additional floor to the existing Head Office building was approved. This was done by the architects J. Fassler & W. D. Howie.

In 1978, R J Laburn undertook alterations to the staircase basement and first floor and in 1980, alterations were made to the entrance hall.

Continued lack of space led the board to take another decision in 1983 to construct a pedestrian bridge to link the neighbouring Sanlam Building to the Rand Water Board Building. This was because various heads of its Head Offices were accommodated in the Sanlam Building (stand 4779) at the time.

== Later Years – Relocation to Rietvlei ==
The RWB had undertaken as many extensions and improvements as were practicable to the Fraser Street building and its Extension building, and having exhausted all avenues for further expansion decided to relocate the headquarters.

Consequently, the board agreed that its farm, Rietvlei 101 JR, be used for the purposes of the new head office. It was environmentally suited and considered one of the most scenic spots on the Witwatersrand.

The architects and principle agents for the new Rietvlei project were Stauch Vorster & Partners Inc. They were to be assisted by the quantity-surveying firm of Farrow Laing and Partners. The civil and structural engineers were Ove Arup & Partners while the electrical engineering was to be done by Charles Pein & Partners.

The building was completed in 1989 and RWB staff had started occupying completed parts of the building in 1988.

== Recent History - 3 Fraser Street and Custom House Extension ==
The Rand Water Board moved out of the city to Rietvlei and the building was sold to the state. With the proposal of the Kopanong Precinct for the Gauteng Legislature in 2002, this building was to have been demolished providing underground parking with a park on top. Bitterly opposed by the Heritage organizations the project fell through when the matter went to appeal and the demolition permit was denied. However the building was not occupied and currently lies in a dilapidated state.

== Heritage Status of the Rand Water Board Building (3 Fraser Street, 1940) ==
The Rand Water Board Building is recognized as a national heritage asset of exceptional cultural significance for the following reasons:

- The Rand Water Board Building was described by the National Monument Council in 1991 as “finely proportioned and well-detailed building of outstanding architectural quality”
- The Rand Water Board Building is a fine example of the Neo-Classical Modernism architectural style executed in high quality materials
- The Rand Water Board Building was built by John Barrow (Pty) Ltd (Barrow Construction), a company with a reputation for high quality workmanship
- The Rand Water Board Building with its alterations and extensions tells the story of the expansion of the RWB
- The Rand Water Board was an important organization in the development of Johannesburg and this was illustrated by the location of the RWB Head Office within the financial district of the city
- The Rand Water Board Building forms a strong contextual grouping of fine buildings with the neighbouring Custom House, the Second new Library Hotel (1938), Johannesburg Public Library and the Volkskas Buildings.
