= Sally Miall =

British rally driver, novelist, and codebreaker

- Born: Sarah Greenaway Leith; 18 December 1918; Romford, Essex, England
- Died: 6 October 2010 (aged 91); Gerrards Cross, Buckinghamshire, England
- Education: Roedean School
- Alma mater: Newnham College, Cambridge
- Occupations: rally driver and novelist, and a Second World War codebreaker
- Spouses: Nigel Bicknell (m. 1940; div. 1975) Leonard Miall (m. 1975)
- Children: 4, including Stephen Bicknell
- Parent(s): Gordon Leith; Ethel Mary Cox

Sarah Greenaway Miall (née Leith, 18 December 1918 – 6 October 2010), was a British rally driver and novelist, and a Second World War codebreaker at Bletchley Park.

== Early life ==
She was born Sarah Greenaway Leith on 18 December 1918 at New Hall, Romford, Essex, the daughter of (George Easlemont) Gordon Leith (1885–1965), a South African architect who had served as a captain in the Royal Field Artillery (and was recovering from a Western Front gas attack at the time of her birth), and his wife, Ethel Mary Leith, née Cox (1888–1974).

Most of Sally's childhood took place in Johannesburg. In 1934, together with her mother and two sisters, she went back to England, and was educated at Roedean School near Brighton, followed by a bachelor's degree in English from Newnham College, Cambridge.

== Career ==
During the Second World War, she worked as a codebreaker at Bletchley Park.

In 1956, Sally won the ladies' cup in the Acropolis Rally in Athens, Greece, driving a Fiat 600. She worked as secretary to the British School in Athens, and served a committee of academic archaeologists from the London office in Gordon Square, which involved yearly trips to various archaeological digs in Greece run by the school.

As Sally Bicknell, she published several novels, including The Midwinter Violins (1973), The Summer of the Warehouse (1979), and Follow that Uncle! (1980).

== Selected publications ==
- The Midwinter Violins (1973)
- The Summer of the Warehouse (1979)
- Follow that Uncle! (1980)

== Personal life ==
On 26 July 1940, Sally Leith married a fellow Cambridge student, Nigel Bicknell (1918–1990), then a pilot in the Volunteer Reserve.

They had four sons together, Stephen Bicknell (1957–2007) the organ builder and writer about the organ, and Marcus, Alexander and Julian, an architect.

They divorced in 1975, and later that year, she married the BBC broadcaster and administrator Leonard Miall (1914–2005).

== Later life ==
After her second husband died in 2005, she continued to live at Maryfield Cottage in Taplow until shortly before her death from colon cancer on 6 October 2010 at Austenwood Nursing Home in Gerrards Cross.
