= Leonard Miall =

British broadcaster and administrator at the BBC (1914–2005)

Rowland Leonard Miall (6 November 1914 – 24 February 2005) was a British broadcaster and administrator at the BBC for 35 years, from 1939 to 1974. In retirement, he became a research historian, studying the history of broadcasting.

== Early life ==
Miall was born in London and educated at Bootham School in York. He learned German at Freiburg University, and read economics and law at St John's College, Cambridge. He was President of the Cambridge Union Society and Editor of the Cambridge Review.

== BBC career ==
Miall joined the European Service of the BBC in early 1939. He took charge of broadcasts in German until 1942, when was seconded to the Political Warfare Executive and sent to work on psychological warfare in New York City and San Francisco. He returned to London in 1944, and then worked in the Psychological Warfare Division of SHAEF in Luxembourg.

He returned to the BBC in 1945, and was briefly a special correspondent in Czechoslovakia. He became the BBC's American correspondent from 1945 to 1953, covering nearly all of the Harry Truman's presidency, and the first year of Dwight D. Eisenhower's. Although based in Washington, D.C., he visited all of the then 48 U.S. states. His radio broadcasts made his voice a familiar feature of BBC news coverage.

In June 1947, he reported a speech at Harvard by George Marshall, on reconstruction in Europe. Ernest Bevin, then British Foreign Secretary, heard the broadcast, and was spurred to press ahead with what became the Marshall Plan for the nations of Europe to rebuild their economies after the war.

When Miall returned to London, he served as head of "television talks" – documentaries and current affairs – at BBC television from 1954, assisted by Grace Wyndham Goldie and based at Lime Grove. During that period, programmes such as Monitor, Tonight and The Sky at Night were created; Panorama was relaunched; and David Attenborough began his wildlife broadcasting career.

Miall was promoted to assistant controller at the BBC in 1961, in charge of the planning for the new BBC television channel, BBC2, which began broadcasting in 1964. He was appointed OBE in 1961.

After a period as Assistant Controller for Programme Services, Television, Miall returned to America in 1966 to run the BBC's New York office, in charge of editing news coverage and also selling BBC costume dramas to American television channels. He returned to London in 1971 to become controller of overseas and foreign relations. He was involved in the establishment of the Commonwealth Broadcasting Association. He retired in 1974.

== Later life ==
In retirement, he researched broadcasting history. He became a consultant research historian at the BBC, and assisted Professor Asa Briggs in producing the official History of Broadcasting in the United Kingdom. He also wrote obituaries for The Independent from 1987, and published a book, Inside The BBC: British broadcasting characters, in 1994.

== Family life ==
Miall married Lorna Rackham, in 1941, and together they had three sons and a daughter. She died in 1974. He married his second wife, Sally Bicknell (née Leith), in 1975, becoming the stepfather of Stephen and Julian Bicknell, as well as their two brothers. He retired to Taplow in Berkshire, where he died a few months after celebrating his 90th birthday.
