= Tait (surname) =

Tait is a Scottish surname which means 'pleasure' or 'delight'. The origins of the name can be traced back as far as 1100.

Notable people with the surname Tait or Taitt include:

- Alan Tait (born 1964), Scottish rugby player and coach
- Alasdair Tait, British cellist and teacher
- Alex Tait (disambiguation), several persons

- Alex Tait (cricketer) (born 1972), New Zealand cricketer
- Alex Tait (footballer) (1933–2018), English footballer
- Alex Tait (rugby union) (born 1988), English rugby union player

- Alex Tait (poet) (1720–1800), Scottish poet
- Alice Tait (born 1986), Australian swimmer
- Angus Tait (1919–2007), New Zealand businessman
- Ashley Tait (born 1975), British ice hockey player
- Archibald Tait (1811–1882), English archbishop
- Arthur Fitzwilliam Tait (1819–1905), American artist
- Barry Tait (1938–2020), English footballer
- Blyth Tait (born 1961), New Zealand equestrian
- Bobby Tait (1938–2024), Scottish footballer
- Bobby Tait (Cowdenbeath footballer) (c. 1886–1950), Scottish footballer
- Campbell Tait (1886–1946), British naval officer colonial governor
- Cecilia Tait (born 1962), Peruvian volleyball player and politician
- Charles Tait (politician) (1768–1835), American politician
- Charles Tait (film director) (1868–1933), Australian film director
- Chris Tait, Canadian singer–songwriter and producer
- David M. Tait (born 1947), Scottish airline executive
- David Tait (1987–2012), English rugby union player
- Doug Taitt (1902–1970), Major League baseball player
- Douglas Tait (disambiguation), several persons

- Douglas Tait (illustrator), Canadian children's book illustrator
- Douglas Tait (actor) (born 1978), American actor, creature performer, stuntman and producer

- Edward Joseph Tait (1878–1948), Australian theatrical entrepreneur
- Eric Tait (born 1951), English football player and manager
- Flavien Tait (born 1993), French footballer
- Francis M. Taitt (1862–1943), bishop of the Episcopal Diocese of Pennsylvania
- George Tait (1858–1882), English footballer
- Gerald Tait (1866–1938), Scottish sailor
- Glen Tait, Canadian politician
- Gordon Tait (1912–1999), British architect
- Gordon Tait (Royal Navy officer) (1921–2005), British admiral
- Gregor Tait (born 1979), Scottish swimmer
- Frank Samuel Tait (1883–1965), Australian theatre entrepreneur
- Frederick Guthrie Tait (1870–1900), Scottish soldier and amateur golfer
- Ian Tait (1926–2013), British general practitioner
- James Tait (disambiguation), several persons

- James Tait (historian) (1863–1944), English medieval historian
- James Brian Tait (1916–2007), British bomber pilot
- James Edward Tait (1886–1918), Scottish–Canadian soldier
- James Francis Tait (1926–2014), British endocrinologist
- James Michael Tait (born 1951), American truck driver involved in the Enumclaw horse sex case
- James Sharp Tait (1912–1998), Scottish electrical engineer and academic administrator
- James Sinclair Tait (1849–1928), Canadian physician, author and politician
- James Haldane Tait (1771–1845), Scottish naval commander
- James Tait (1834–1915), English architect of Clarendon Park Congregational Church, Leicester

- Jason Tait, Canadian musician
- Jessie Tait (1928–2010), English ceramic designer
- Jock Tait (1886–1945), Scottish cricketer
- Joe Tait (1937–2021), American sports broadcaster
- John Tait (disambiguation), several persons

- John Tait (American football) (born 1975), professional football player
- John Tait (architect) (1787–1856), Scottish architect
- John Tait (entrepreneur) (1871–1955), Australian film and theatre entrepreneur
- John Tait (horseman) (1813–1888), racehorse owner/trainer in Australian Racing Hall of Fame
- John Tait (rugby union) (born 1973), Canadian rugby player
- John Tait (runner) (1888–1971), Olympic athlete
- John Guthrie Tait (1861–1945), Scottish educator and international rugby union player
- John W. Tait (born 1945), English Egyptologist
- John Barclay Tait (1900–1973), British hydrographist
- John Robinson Tait (1834–1909), American landscape painter, art critic, and travel writer
- John Tait (physiologist) (1878–1944), Scots-born professor of physiology
- John Guthrie Tait (1861–1945), Scottish educator and international rugby player

- Jordan Tait (born 1979), English footballer
- Katharine Tait (1923–2021), British writer
- Kenneth Tait (1918–1941), New Zealand flying ace
- Lauren Tait (born 1996), Scottish netball player
- Laurie Taitt (1934–2006), British hurdler
- Lawson Tait (1845–1899), Scottish gynecologist
- Luke Tait (born 1981), Canadian rugby union player
- Lynn Taitt (1934–2010), Trinidad and Tobago reggae guitarist
- Margaret Tait (1918–1999), Scottish film maker and poet
- Marion Tait, ballerina and ballet mistress
- Mat Tait (born 1970), New Zealand author, illustrator, artist and cartoonist
- Mathew Tait (born 1986), English rugby union player
- Melanie Tait (born 1981), Australian radio broadcaster, playwright and author
- Melbourne McTaggart Tait (1842–1917), Canadian lawyer and judge
- Merepeka Raukawa-Tait, New Zealand politician and activist
- Michael Tait (born 1966), American musician
- Mick Tait (born 1956), English footballer and manager
- Nancy Tait (1920–2009), English activist
- Nevin Tait (1876–1961), Australian concert promoter and film producer
- Norman Tait (1941–2016), Canadian artist and totem pole carver
- Paul Tait (disambiguation), several persons

- Paul Tait (footballer, born 1971), English midfielder for Birmingham City
- Paul Tait (footballer, born 1974), English striker for Northwich Victoria

- Percy Tait (1929–2019), British motorcycle road racer and tester
- Peter Tait (disambiguation), several persons

- Peter Tait (physicist) (1831–1901), Scottish mathematical physicist
- Peter Tait (footballer) (1936–1990), English professional footballer
- Peter Tait (mayor) (1915–1996), New Zealand politician
- Peter Tait (radio presenter) (1950–2002), English radio presenter
- Peter Tait (rugby union) (1906–1980), Scottish rugby union player
- Peter Tait (sport shooter) (born 1949), Australian Paralympian

- Richard Tait (born 1947), British journalist and academic
- Robert Tait (disambiguation), several persons

- Robert Lawson Tait (1845–1899), British medical pioneer
- Robert Tait (captain) (fl. 1793), Scottish naval officer

- Robin Tait (1940–1984), New Zealand discus thrower
- Roger Tait (1938–2023), New Zealand rugby league player
- Sarah Tait (1983–2016), Australian rower
- Shaun Tait (born 1983), Australian cricketer
- Sylvia Tait (born 1932), Canadian painter
- Thomas Tait (disambiguation), several persons
- Timothy M. P. Tait (born 1971), Canadian/American physicist
- Tom Tait (volleyball) (1937–2024), American volleyball coach
- Tommy Tait (disambiguation), several persons

- Tommy Tait (socialist) (1881–1941), Scottish socialist and industrial unionist
- Tommy Tait (footballer, born 1879) (1879–1942), Scottish international footballer for Sunderland
- Tommy Tait (footballer, born 1908) (1908–1976), English footballer for Sunderland, Manchester City

- Victor Hubert Tait (1892–1988), Canadian soldier and airman
- Viola Tait (1911–2002), Australian biographer
- William Tait (disambiguation), several persons

- William Auld Tait (1826–1900), Canadian pioneer and politician
- William W. Tait (1929–2024), professor of philosophy at the University of Chicago
- William Tait (cricketer), New Zealand cricketer
- William Tait (footballer), Association football player during the 1890s and 1900s.
- William Tait (publisher) (1793–1864), known for Tait's Magazine
- William Tait (MP) (died 1800), Member of Parliament for Stirling Burghs

== See also ==
- Tate (surname)
