= James Tait =

James Tait may refer to:

- James Tait (historian) (1863–1944), English medieval historian
- James Brian Tait (1916–2007), British bomber pilot
- James Edward Tait (1886–1918), Scottish–Canadian soldier
- James Francis Tait (1926–2014), British endocrinologist
- James Michael Tait (born c. 1951), American truck driver involved in the Enumclaw horse sex case
- James Sharp Tait (1912–1998), Scottish electrical engineer and academic administrator
- James Sinclair Tait (1849–1928), Canadian physician, author and politician
- James Haldane Tait (1771–1845), Scottish naval commander
- James Tait (architect) (1834–1915), English architect
