= Bucquoy Road Cemetery =

Cemetery in Pas-de-Calais, France

- Commonwealth War Graves Commission
- For First and Second World Wars
- Established: April 1917
- Location: 50.22215°N 2.76229°E; Ficheux, Pas-de-Calais
- Designed by: Sir Edwin Lutyens
- Total burials: 2,038
- Unknowns: First World War: 169 Second World War: 25

Burials by nation
- First World War: United Kingdom: 1,285; Canada: 447; India: 1; Second World War: United Kingdom: 77

Burials by war
- First World War: 1,902 Second World War: 136

Bucquoy Road Cemetery is a Commonwealth War Graves Commission military cemetery containing Commonwealth burials from the First and Second World Wars, located in the French department of Pas-de-Calais.

Bucquoy Road Cemetery is located 3.9 miles (6.3 km) south of Arras and 1.2 miles (1.9 km) east of Ficheux.

== History ==
Between 1914 and 1917, was occupied by the German Empire and lay far behind the Western Front, however, in April 1917, German forces retreated behind the Hindenburg Line which meant the area was occupied by British forces.

The cemetery was started by the dressing stations of VII Corps and further grew with casualties from nearby ambulance units and other facets of the Royal Army Medical Corps.

By November 1918, the cemetery contained 1,166 burials but soon grew as other graves from smaller cemeteries were transferred to Bucquoy Road.

During the Second World War, British troops were again based closed to Bucquoy Road and casualties from the German advance were buried alongside the fallen from the First World War.

== Notable burials ==
- Pte. Joseph Standing Buffalo (of Fort Qu'Appelle, Saskatchewan), 78th Bn., Canadian Expeditionary Force. Pte. Buffalo was killed on 29 September 1918 and is buried in Row IV, Grave B34. Pte. Buffalo was a grandson of the famous Sioux chief, Sitting Bull.
