= Tommy Tait =

Tommy Tait may refer to:

- Tommy Tait (socialist)
- Tommy Tait (footballer, born 1879) (1879–1942), Scottish international footballer (Sunderland)
- Tommy Tait (footballer, born 1908) (1908–1976), English footballer (Sunderland, Hetton, Middlesbrough, Southport, Manchester City)

== See also ==
- Thomas Tait (disambiguation)
- Tommy Tate (born 1956), American football coach
- Tommy Tate (musician) (1945–2017), American soul singer and songwriter
