= Admiral Tait =

Admiral Tait may refer to:

- Campbell Tait (1886–1946), British Royal Navy admiral
- Gordon Tait (Royal Navy officer) (1921–2005), British Royal Navy admiral
- James Haldane Tait (1771–1845), British Royal Navy rear admiral
