= Robert Tait =

Robert Tait may refer to:

- Robert Tait (Royal Navy officer) (fl. 1793), Scottish naval officer
- Robert Tait (cricketer) (1885—1973), Scottish cricketer
- Robert Lawson Tait (1845–1899), British medical pioneer
- Bobby Tait (1938–2024), Scottish footballer
- Bobby Tait (Cowdenbeath footballer) (c. 1886–1950), Scottish footballer

== See also ==
- Robert J. Tait Elementary School
- Robert Tate (disambiguation)
