= HMS Spartiate (1798) =

Ship of the line of the Royal Navy

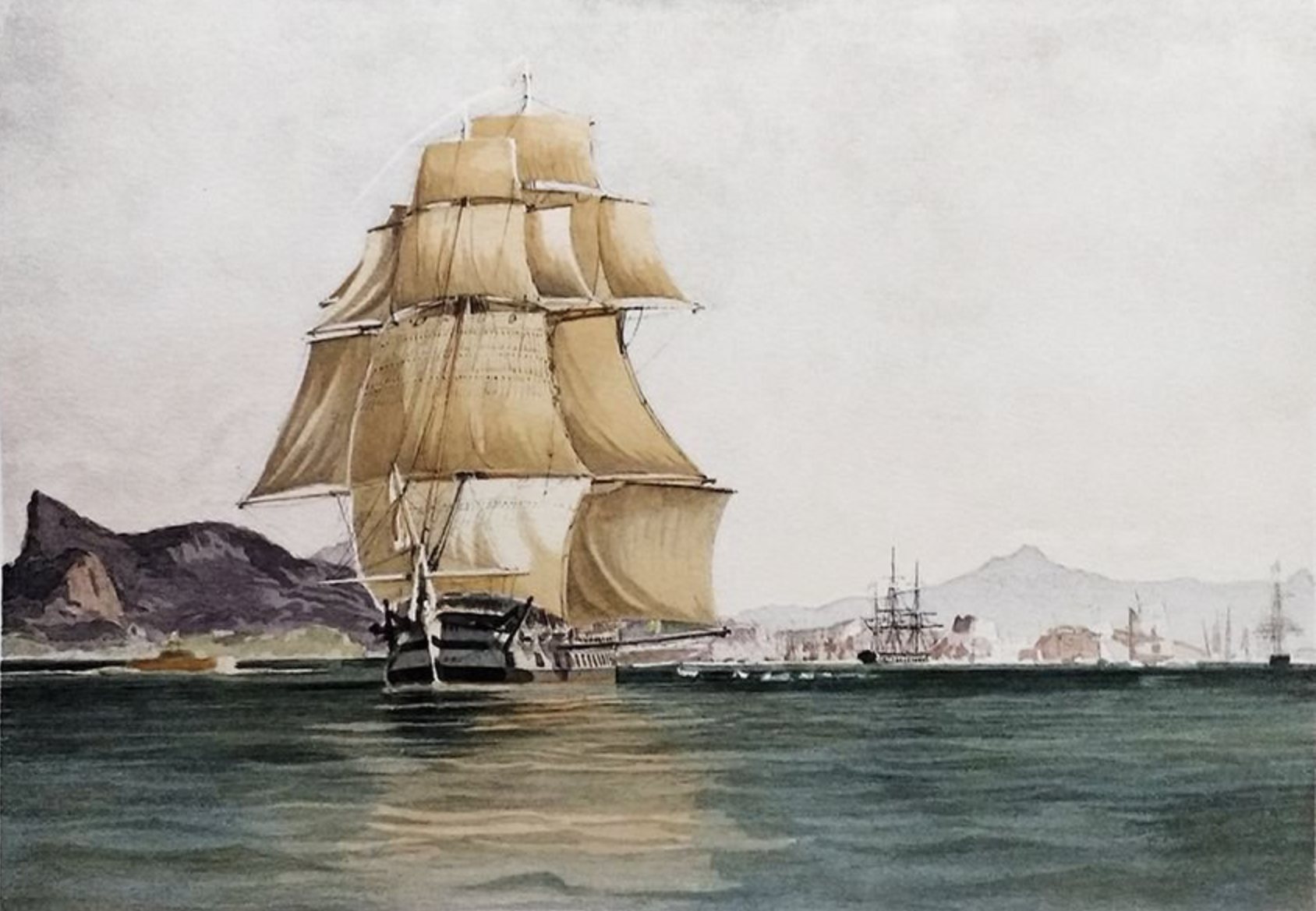
- Spartiate leaving Rio de Janeiro in 1835, by Emeric Essex Vidal

History

France
- Name: Spartiate
- Builder: Toulon shipyard
- Laid down: November 1794
- Launched: 24 November 1797
- Commissioned: March 1798
- Honours and awards: Participated in: Battle of the Nile
- Captured: 2 August 1798, by Royal Navy

Great Britain
- Name: HMS Spartiate
- Acquired: 2 August 1798
- Out of service: August 1842
- Honours and awards: Participated in: Battle of Trafalgar
- Fate: Broken up, May 1857

General characteristics
- Class & type: Téméraire-class ship of the line
- Displacement: 3,069 tonneaux
- Tons burthen: 1,537 port tonneaux
- Length: 55.87 metres (183.3 ft) (172 pied)
- Beam: 14.90 metres (48 ft 11 in)
- Draught: 7.26 metres (23.8 ft) (22 pied)
- Propulsion: Up to 2,485 m^{2} (26,750 sq ft) of sails
- Armament: 74 guns: Lower gun deck: 28 × 36-pounder long guns; Upper gun deck: 30 × 18-pounder long guns; Forecastle and Quarter deck: 16 × 8-pounder long guns; 4 × 36-pdr carronades
- Armour: Timber

La Spartiate (far right) at the Battle of the Nile, 1 August 1798, by Mather Brown

The Spartiate was originally a French 74-gun ship of the line, launched in 1797. In 1798, she took part in the Battle of the Nile, where she became one of the nine ships captured by the Royal Navy.

== Career ==
In 1805, HMS Spartiate fought at the Battle of Trafalgar under Francis Laforey. With Minotaur, she forced the surrender of the Spanish ship Neptuno, of 80 guns. Casualties were three killed (two seamen & one boy), and twenty wounded (the boatswain [Clarke], two Midshipmen [Bellairs & Knapman], one Marine [William Parsons] and sixteen sailors), according to the three logs (Captain's log, Ship's log, Master's log).

Spartiate returned to her home port of Plymouth for repairs from December 1805 to February 1806. Thereafter she joined the Channel Fleet and, for the next two years, was involved in the blockade of Rochefort. (Note: The Captain's log does show that she returned to the United Kingdom for replenishment purposes at the following time periods: 25 July to 3 August 1806, 14 January to 26 February 1807, 29 June to 16 September 1807) In January 1808, she was in Admiral Strachan's squadron, and pursued Contre-Admiral Zacharie Allemand's flight from Rochefort. On 21 February 1808 she joined the Mediterranean Fleet at Palermo, and was deployed here until the end of 1809. In June 1809, she participated in the attack on the islands of Ischia and Procida.

In the 1820s and 30s Spartiate was assigned to the Royal Navy's South America Station. In 1824 Spartiate was damaged and the Navy sent shipwrights from England to repair her.

In 1832 Spartiate, under the command of Captain Robert Tait (Royal Navy officer), became the flagship of Rear Admiral Sir Michael Seymour, 1st Baronet, the newly appointed commander of the South America Station.

In July 1834 Sir Michael died while underway to the station but Spartiate and Tait continued to serve his successor, Vice Admiral Sir Graham Eden Hamond, 2nd Baronet until 1835 (when Hamond shifted his Flag to HMS Dublin (1812).

=== Fate ===
Spartiate was converted to a sheer hulk in August 1842. She was later broken up, a process completed on 30 May 1857.

=== Legacy ===
On board during the Trafalgar action was First-Lieutenant James Clephan, who was presented with the ship's Union Jack by the crew after the battle as a mark of their esteem. The flag, recently found in a drawer of one of the descendants of James Clephan, is regarded as one of very few surviving Union Flags from the Battle of Trafalgar, and probably the best preserved. With battle scars still visible, it was sold for £384,000 when it went for auction in London on Trafalgar Day, 21 October 2009.

This flag was put up for auction again, for only the second time, by the Zaricor Flag Collection at Christies and was sold on 1 July 2025 for £1,068,500
