= Peter Tait =

Peter Tait may refer to:

- Peter Guthrie Tait (1831–1901), Scottish mathematical physicist
- Peter Tait (footballer) (1936–1990), English professional footballer
- Peter Tait (mayor) (1915–1996), New Zealand politician
- Peter Tait (radio presenter) (1950–2002), English radio presenter
- Peter Tait (sport shooter) (born 1949), Australian Paralympian
- Peter Tait (rugby union) (1906–1980), Scottish rugby union player

== See also ==
- Tait (surname)
