= Richmond Green United Reformed Church =

former Richmond Green United Reformed Church
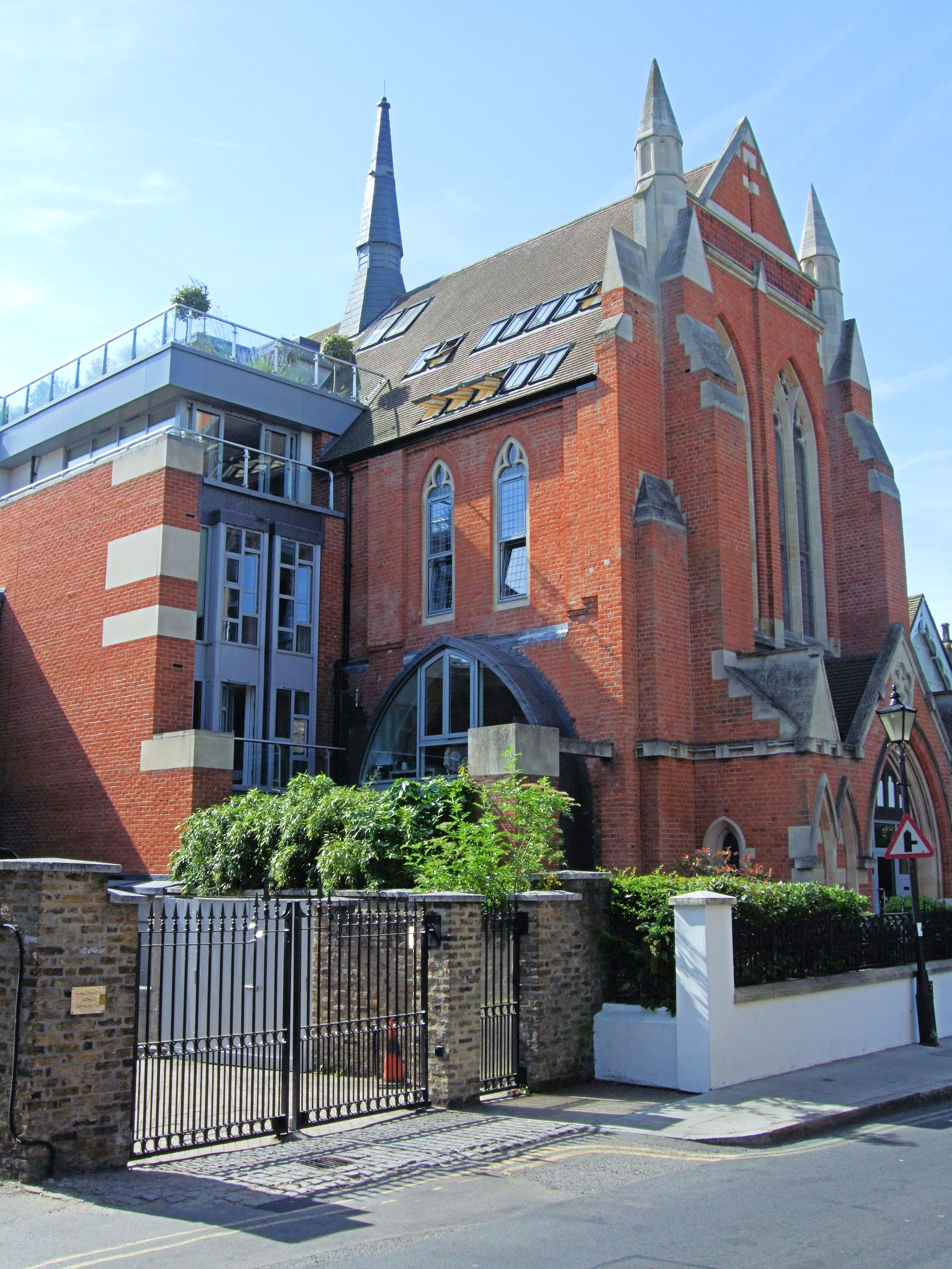
- The former church building on Little Green, now converted into flats
- former Richmond Green United Reformed Church
- 51.462013°N 0.303224°W
- OS grid reference: TQ 60097 76186
- Location: Quadrant Road, Little Green, Richmond, London
- Country: England
- Denomination: United Reformed
- Previous denomination: Presbyterian

History
- Former name: Richmond Presbyterian Church
- Founded: 1877
- Founder: John Mauchlin

Architecture
- Functional status: Closed
- Architect: William Wallace
- Closed: 2015

Listed Building – Grade II
- Official name: United Reformed Church
- Designated: 20 June 1997
- Reference no.: 1245338

Richmond Green United Reformed Church was a church and congregation in Richmond, London from 1877 until 2015.

It was formed in 1877 as Richmond Presbyterian Church. The church was previously located on Little Green, close to Richmond Green, in a Grade II listed building designed in a Gothic Revival style by William Wallace in 1883 and built from 1884 to 1885. That building remains but has been adapted for residential use.

The church became a United Reformed Church (URC) in 1972, following the union of the Presbyterian Church of England and the Congregational Church of England and Wales.

From October 2006 the congregation of Richmond Green United Reformed Church met for worship in a new building in Quadrant Road, behind the previous church building. It was joined by members of the former East Sheen United Reformed Church, a congregation dating from the 17th century, which had previously been meeting in a building in Vernon Road, dating from 1902. Designed by F C Howgate and originally known as the Congregational Church, East Sheen, it was noted for its Doulton terracotta work and plaques. The London Borough of Richmond granted planning permission in March 2012 for the conversion of the first floor Sunday school building to provide five self-contained flats.

The church closed in September 2015 and most of the remaining members joined the Twickenham United Reformed Church. The building in Quadrant Road is now the property of Richmond upon Thames Council, and is used by Richmond Lending Library as an annex.

== Notable former members ==
- Sir Thomas "Tom" Kibble (1932–2016), theoretical physicist
- Sir James Sharp Tait (1912–1998), electrical engineer and first Vice-Chancellor of City University, London
