= Raven's Cry (novel) =

1966 novel by Christie Harris

- Author: Christie Harris
- Cover artist: Bill Reid
- Language: English
- Genre: Novel
- Publisher: University of Washington Press
- Publication date: 1966
- Publication place: Canada
- Media type: Print (hardback)
- Pages: 194
- ISBN: 0295972211

Raven's Cry is a 1966 novel by Christie Harris and illustrated by Bill Reid. The book tells the tale of how the Haida people and their culture were "pushed to the edge of extinction", through the story of the Eagle chief Albert Edward Edenshaw, uncle of Charles Edenshaw. Harris acknowledged the assistance she received from the anthropologist Wilson Duff.

It won the 1967 Canadian Library Association Book of the Year for Children Award.
