= HMS Charybdis (1809) =

Brig-sloop of the Royal Navy

- Charybdis

History

United Kingdom
- Name: HMS Charybdis
- Namesake: Charybdis
- Ordered: 5 September 1808
- Builder: Mark Richards & John Davidson, Hythe
- Laid down: October 1808
- Launched: 28 August 1809
- Commissioned: September 1809
- Decommissioned: August 1815
- Fate: Sold, February 1819

United Kingdom
- Name: Greenwich
- Owner: 1819: Samuel Enderby & Sons; 1830:Daniel Bennett & Son
- Acquired: c.1819 by purchase
- Fate: Wrecked 18 February 1833

General characteristics
- Class & type: Cruizer-class brig-sloop
- Tons burthen: 384, or 394 bm
- Length: 100 ft 3 in (30.56 m) o/a; 77 ft 6 1/2 in (23.635 m)
- Beam: 30 ft 6 3/4 in (9.315 m)
- Depth of hold: 12 ft 9 in (3.89 m)
- Sail plan: Brig
- Complement: 121
- Armament: 16 × 32-pounder carronades + 2 × 6-pounder bow guns

HMS Charybdis was a Royal Navy Cruizer-class brig-sloop built by Mark Richards and John Davidson at Hythe, and launched in 1809. She captured two American prizes during the War of 1812 before she was laid up in 1815 and sold in 1819. She apparently then became the whaler Greenwich, which made three voyages for Samuel Enderby & Sons and one for Daniel Bennett & Son. She was wrecked in the Seychelles in 1833 on her fourth whaling voyage.

== Service ==
She was commissioned in September 1809 under Commander Robert Merrick Fowler, who sailed her for the Leeward Islands on 22 January 1810. On 20 April 1811 Commander James Clephan took command.

On 8 October 1812 Charybdis recaptured the brig William Rathbone. Saucy Jack, an American privateer out of Charleston, on 28 September had captured William Rathbone, which had been armed with 14 guns and had a crew of 30 men. The Americans put a prize crew aboard. When Charybdis recaptured William Rathbone she returned the vessel to her officers and crew. (Note: Niles Weekly register (Vol.3, p. 157), reported that Saucy Jack had taken the prize in the port of Demerara, and that William Rathbone had been armed with fourteen 18-pounder and two 6-pounder guns. She had also had a cargo worth £40,000.) William Rathbone arrived at St Thomas on 12 October.

Then on 31 October Charybdis captured the American privateer schooner Blockade and her 66-man crew in the Sombrero Passage near Saba Rock. (Note: Although the Gazette apparently dated Clephan's letter 31 December, the actual capture took place earlier. Lloyd's List (LL) on 1 January 1813 carried a report dated Barbados 19 November, that Charybdis had captured Blockade and sent her into Antigua.)

Blockade, E.Mix., master, was a schooner out of New York. She had captured one British schooner before Charybdis captured her. Clephan reported that the schooner Blockade had captured was a small one out of St Lucia and that two days earlier Blockade had abandoned her prize while a British brig was chasing the privateer. Clephan described Blockade as a fine schooner of 128 tons burthen that had had her keel laid only three months earlier.

American reports stated that the capture took place after an action of one hour and 20 minutes during which Blockade lost 28 men killed and the British had eight men killed. (Note: James mentions this engagement in passing as an example of lurid and exaggerated American accounts of actions.)

In September Charybdis sailed from Portsmouth with a convoy for Cork, and then went on to America via Halifax. In 1814–15 she participated in the British expedition against New Orleans and, on its failure, conveyed the despatches to Sir George Cockburn, 10th Baronet, situated off Cumberland Island.

She returned to Portsmouth on 2 August 1815.

Disposal: Charybdis sailed from Portsmouth on 10 August 1815 and shortly thereafter was paid off at Deptford in 1815. She was laid up at Deptford until 1819. The "Principal Officers and commissioners of His Majesty's Navy" offered "Charybdis brig, of 385 tons" for sale on 3 February 1819. She was sold to Thomas Pittman on that day for £1,100.

== Whaler ==
Charybdis may have become the whaler Greenwich, which made three voyages for Samuel Enderby & Sons, before being lost on her fourth, for Daniel Bennet & Sons. She first appeared in Lloyd's Register (LR) in 1819 with Emmitt, master, Enderby, owners, and trade London-South Seas. LR gave her launch year as 1809 and her launch location as Southampton. A database of British Southern Whale Fishery whaling voyages gives her launch location as Hythe.

1st whaling voyage (1820–1822): Captain John Gibson sailed from England on 28 January 1820, bound for Timor. She was variously reported at Morotay, Kema, and Amboyna. She was report to have been at Amboyna on 11 September 1821. A Malay she had taken on board had murdered her master and mate and injured four other crew members. Mary provided some men for her crew. Greenwich, Gibson, master, returned on 14 October 1822 with 500 casks of oil.

2nd whaling voyage (1823–1826): Captain R.P.Thompson sailed from London on 18 January 1823, bound for the seas off Japan and for Timor. Greenwich returned on 18 January 1826 with 650 casks and one bale of seal skins or 200 tuns of sperm oil.

3rd whaling voyage (1826–1830): Captain Dunn sailed from London on 23 November 1826, bound for the Seychelles. Greenwich returned on 12 January 1830 with 550 casks (198 tuns) of oil.

== Fate ==
For her fourth voyage Greenwich's ownership changed to Bennett & Son.

Greenwich sailed from London on 13 September 1830, bound for the Indian Ocean. She was reported at Mahé, Seychelles, and Mauritius. She was lost at Danes Island (actually Denis Island about 60 km N of Praslin Island) in the Seychelles on 18 February 1833. Her was crew were rescued and taken to Mauritius. Reliance surveyed the wreck on 1 June 1833.
