= Long Eaton United Reformed Church =

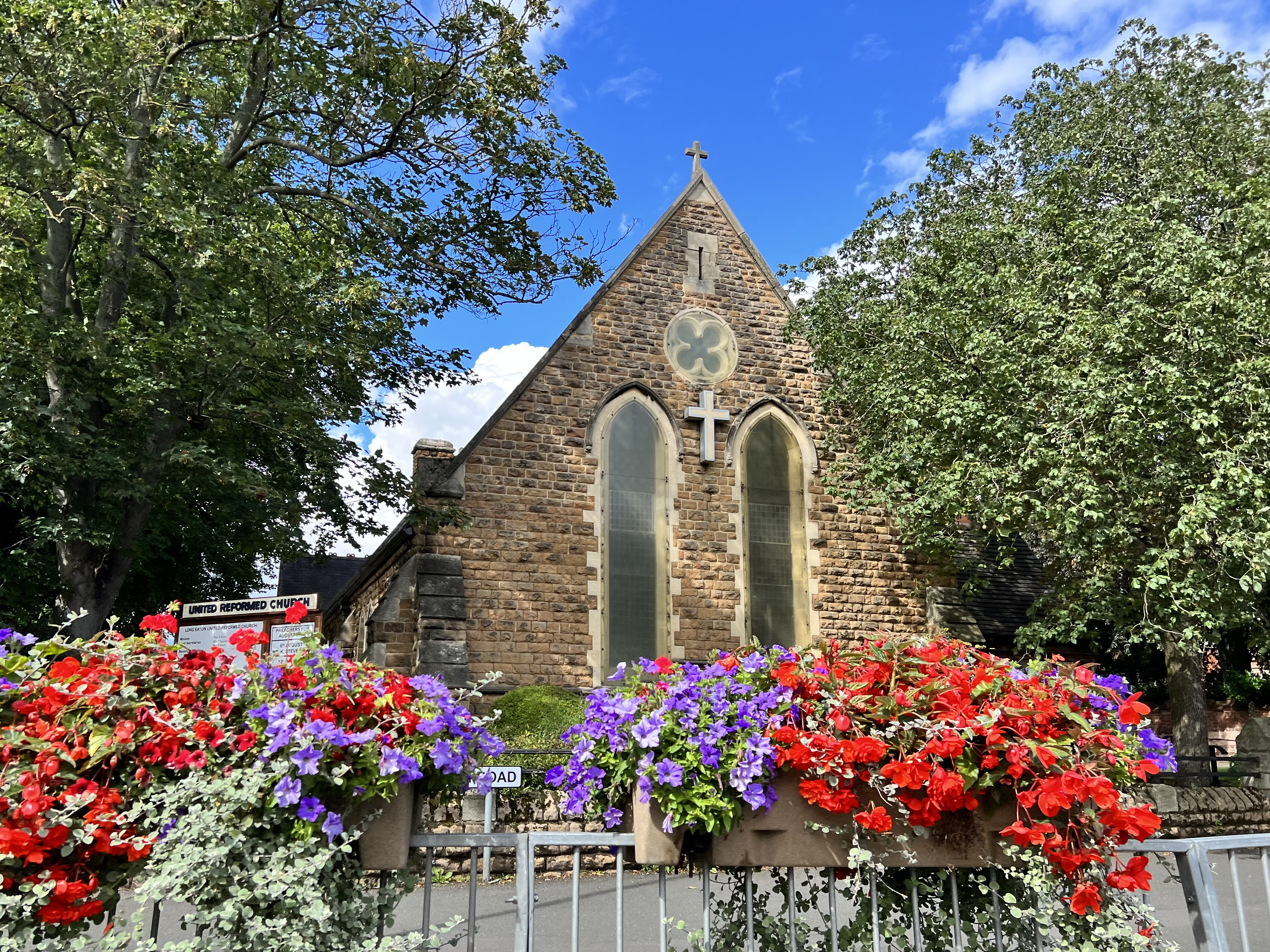
- Long Eaton United Reformed Church

- Location within Derbyshire
- 52°54′00″N 1°16′15″W
- Location: Long Eaton, Derbyshire
- Country: England
- Denomination: United Reformed
- Previous denomination: Congregational
- Website: www.longeatonchurches.org.uk/urc.html

Architecture
- Architect: James Tait of Leicester
- Groundbreaking: 25 March 1876
- Completed: 8 August 1876

Long Eaton United Reformed Church is a United Reformed church in Long Eaton, Derbyshire.

== History ==
The foundation stone of the Congregational Church was laid by James Allport, general manager of the Midland Railway on 25 March 1876. The architect was James Tait of Leicester and the builder was Mr. Poxon of Sawley. It opened for worship on 8 August 1876.

In 1972 the union between the Presbyterian Church of England and the Congregational Church in England and Wales formed the United Reformed Church and from then it was known as Long Eaton United Reformed Church.

== Organ ==
The church purchased an organ in 1907 from a country house. This saw service until 1957 when it was replaced with a new instrument.
