= Paul Tate =

Paul Tate may refer to:

- Paul Tate, character in The Manhunter
- Paul Tate, member of the band UGA Accidentals
- Paul Tate (businessman), indicted in United States v. Scheinberg

== See also ==
- Paul Tait (disambiguation)
