= Thomas Tait =

Thomas Tait may refer to:

- Thomas S. Tait (1882–1954), Scottish Modernist architect
- Thomas James Tait (1864–1940), Canadian-born rail commissioner
- Thomas Tait (cricketer) (1872–1954), English county cricketer
- Thomas Tait, Canadian-born, British fashion designer

== See also ==
- Tommy Tait (disambiguation)
- Thomas Tate (disambiguation)
