= Robert Tate =

Robert Tate may refer to:

- Robert Tate (American football) (born 1973), American football player
- Robert Tate (MP), Sheriff of London in 1482 and 1486
- Robert Ward Tate (1864–1938), New Zealand civil administrator of Samoa (then Western Samoa)
- Robert Tate, American geomagnetist and seismologist after whom the Tate Glacier was named in 1964

== See also ==
- Robert Tait (disambiguation)
