= Christie Harris =

Canadian children's writer (1907–2002)

- Born: November 21, 1907; Newark, New Jersey, U.S.
- Died: January 5, 2002 (aged 94); Vancouver, British Columbia, Canada
- Occupation: Writer
- Writing career
- Period: 1957–1994
- Genre: Children's literature

Christie Lucy Harris, CM (November 21, 1907 – January 5, 2002) was a Canadian children's writer. She is best known for her portrayal of Haida First Nations culture in the 1966 novel Raven's Cry.

== Biography ==
Harris was born in Newark, New Jersey, November 21, 1907, and moved to British Columbia, Canada, with her family as a child.

She was led to investigate Northwest Coast cultures after moving to Prince Rupert, British Columbia, in 1958 and writing a series of CBC dramas on First Nations topics. She received a Canada Council grant to work with the Haida artist Bill Reid in researching the life and context of the great Haida carver Charles Edenshaw. In this she worked closely with Wilson Duff and, in Masset, B.C., with Edenshaw's daughter Florence Davidson.

Her 1975 book Sky Man on the Totem Pole? applies the "ancient astronaut" theories of Erich von Däniken to Northwest Coast oral histories.

In 1980, she was made a Member of the Order of Canada. In 1973, she was awarded the Vicky Metcalf Award.

Three months after her death, the Christie Harris Illustrated Children's Literature Prize was announced as a new BC Book Prize category.

Harris and illustrator Douglas Tait created at least eight books published from 1972 to 1982. One is The Trouble with Princesses (1980), which "retells stories about Northwest Coast princesses and compares them with similar Old World princesses". For that collaboration she won the annual CCCLP prize for English-language writing (now the Governor General's Award for English-language children's literature) and he won the CLA award for children's book illustration, the 1981 Amelia Frances Howard-Gibbon Illustrator's Award.

Harris won the annual Canadian Library Association Book of the Year for Children Award both in 1967 for The Raven's Cry and in 1977 for Mouse Woman and the Vanished Princesses (another collaboration with Tait).

== Works ==
- Cariboo Trail (Longmans, 1957), adventure stories, OCLC 1815057
- Once Upon a Totem (Atheneum Books, 1963), stories, woodcuts by John Frazer Mills, OCLC 333217
- You Have to Draw the Line Somewhere (1964), illustrated by Moira Johnston
- West with the White Chiefs (1965), woodcuts by Walter Ferro – "based on the [1865] journal of Viscount Milton and Dr. Cheadle", OCLC 25435114
- Raven's Cry (1966), Haida folklore, ill. Bill Reid
- Confessions of a Toe-Hanger (1967), ill. Moira Johnston
- Forbidden Frontier (1968), novel, ill. E. Carey Kenney
- Let X Be Excitement (1969), novel
- Figleafing Through History: The Dynamics of Dress (1971), written by Harris and Johnston, ill. Johnston
- Secret in the Stlalakum Wild (1972), novel, illustrated by Douglas Tait, LCCN 72-175554
- Mule Lib (McClelland & Stewart, 1972), by Tom and Christie Harris, ill. Franklin Arbuckle – "subjects: World War, 1914-1918 — Personal narratives, Canadian", OCLC 3791852
- Once More Upon a Totem (1973), stories, ill. Tait
- Sky Man on the Totem Pole? (1975), stories, ill. Tait
- Mouse Woman and the Vanished Princesses (1976), stories, ill. Tait
- Mouse Woman and the Mischief-makers (1977), stories, ill. Tait
- Mystery at the edge of two worlds (1978), novel, ill. Lou Crockett, OCLC 15854658
- Mouse Woman and the Muddle-heads (1979), stories, ill. Tait
- The Trouble with Princesses (1980), stories, ill. Tait – "retells stories about Northwest Coast princesses and compares them with similar Old World princesses", OCLC 9085067
- The Trouble with Adventurers (1982), stories, ill. Tait – "Northwest Coast Indian legends and myths about adventurers", OCLC 15917058
- Something Weird Is Going On (Victoria, BC: Orca Book Publishers, 1994), detective and mystery stories, OCLC 31286515
