= James Clephan =

Captain James Clephan
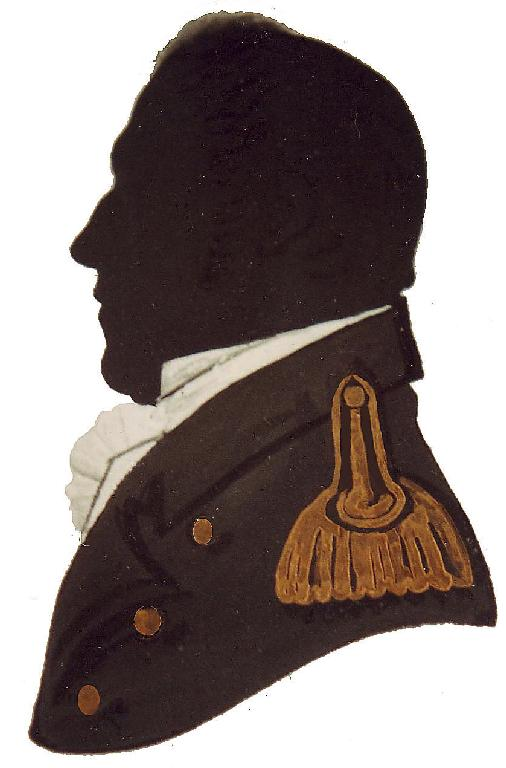
- Born: 1768; Scoonie, Fife
- Died: 1851 (aged 82–83); Edinburgh
- Military career
- Allegiance: United Kingdom
- Branch: Royal Navy
- Service years: 1794–1840
- Rank: Captain
- Commands: HMS Charybdis
- Conflicts: French Revolutionary War; Napoleonic Wars; Battle of Trafalgar; War of 1812; Gulf Campaign

Captain James Clephan (1768–1851) was a Royal Navy officer who served as a lieutenant at the Battle of Trafalgar in 1805. He rose from the ranks to become a post-captain. A flag presented to him after the battle by the crew of the ship on which he served at Trafalgar was sold at auction for £384,000 on Trafalgar Day 2009.

== Biography ==
Born in Scoonie in Fife, Scotland in 1768, Clephan was originally a weaver but joined the Merchant navy when the weaving industry went into decline. He was press ganged into the Royal Navy on 23 July 1794 aged 26. Beginning as an Able Bodied 2nd Class Mate aboard HMS Sibyl, he then made 2nd Class Gunner's Mate on HMS Doris and master's mate on 10 October 1796.

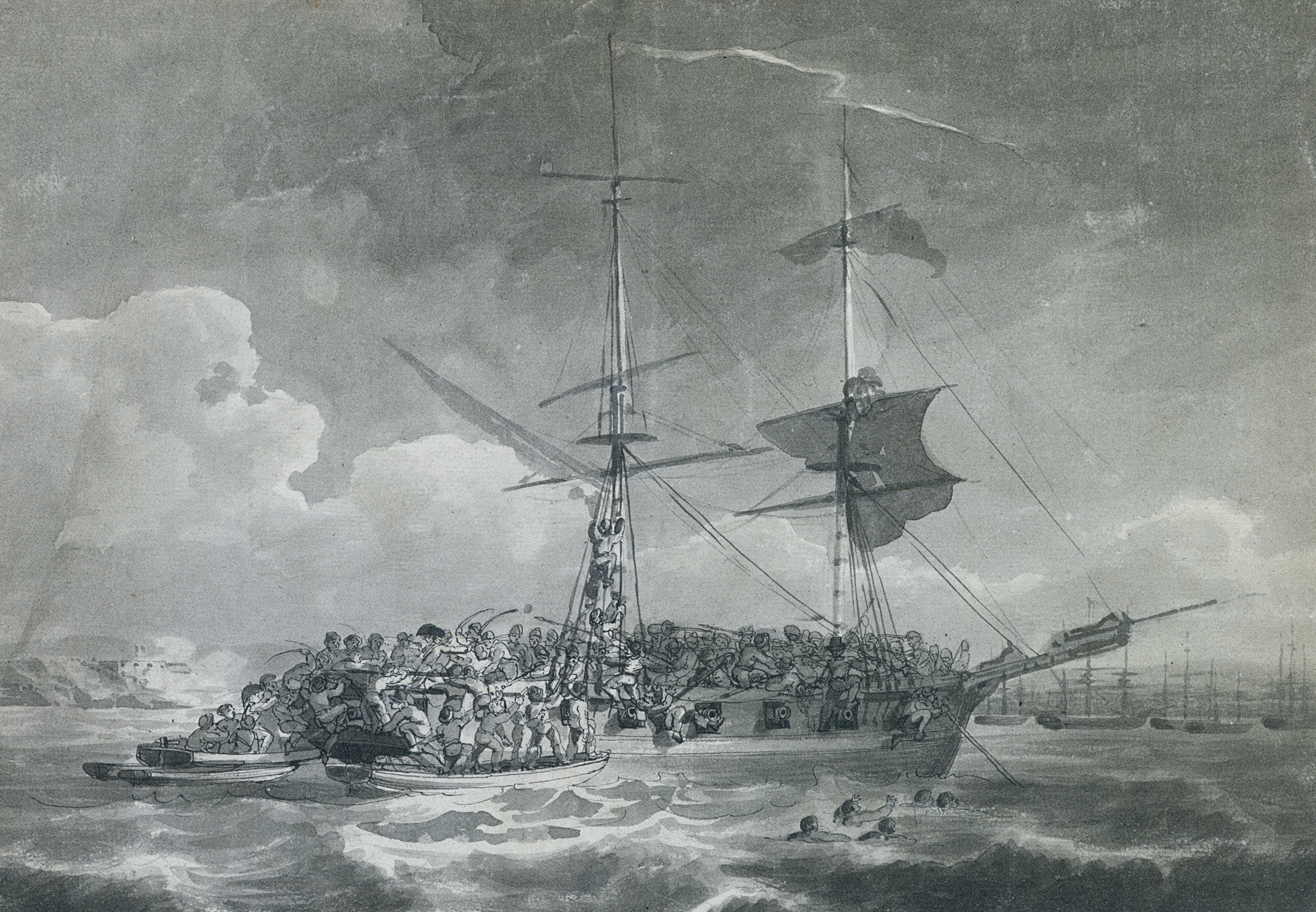
The cutting out of a French brig, possibly La Chevrette

He was promoted to Midshipman on 7 January 1801 and was promoted to lieutenant on 31 July 1801 for distinguished conduct during the successful capture of the French corvette Chevrette at Brest. Despite being wounded and knocked overboard, Clephan was still the first man to reach the enemy's deck. On his promotion Admiral Sir William Cornwallis said "..you well deserve your promotion; few officers have earned it so hardly."

Assigned to the 90-gun HMS Namur, Clephan served as her Second Lieutenant until the Peace of Amiens in April 1802. Taking the opportunity to marry during this brief interval, in March 1803 Clephan was appointed First Lieutenant of the 74-gun HMS Spartiate, which had been captured from the French during the Battle of the Nile. He was on board Spartiate during the Battle of Trafalgar in 1805, after which he was presented with the ship's Union Jack as a mark of esteem from the crew. He served on board Spartiate until December 1809.

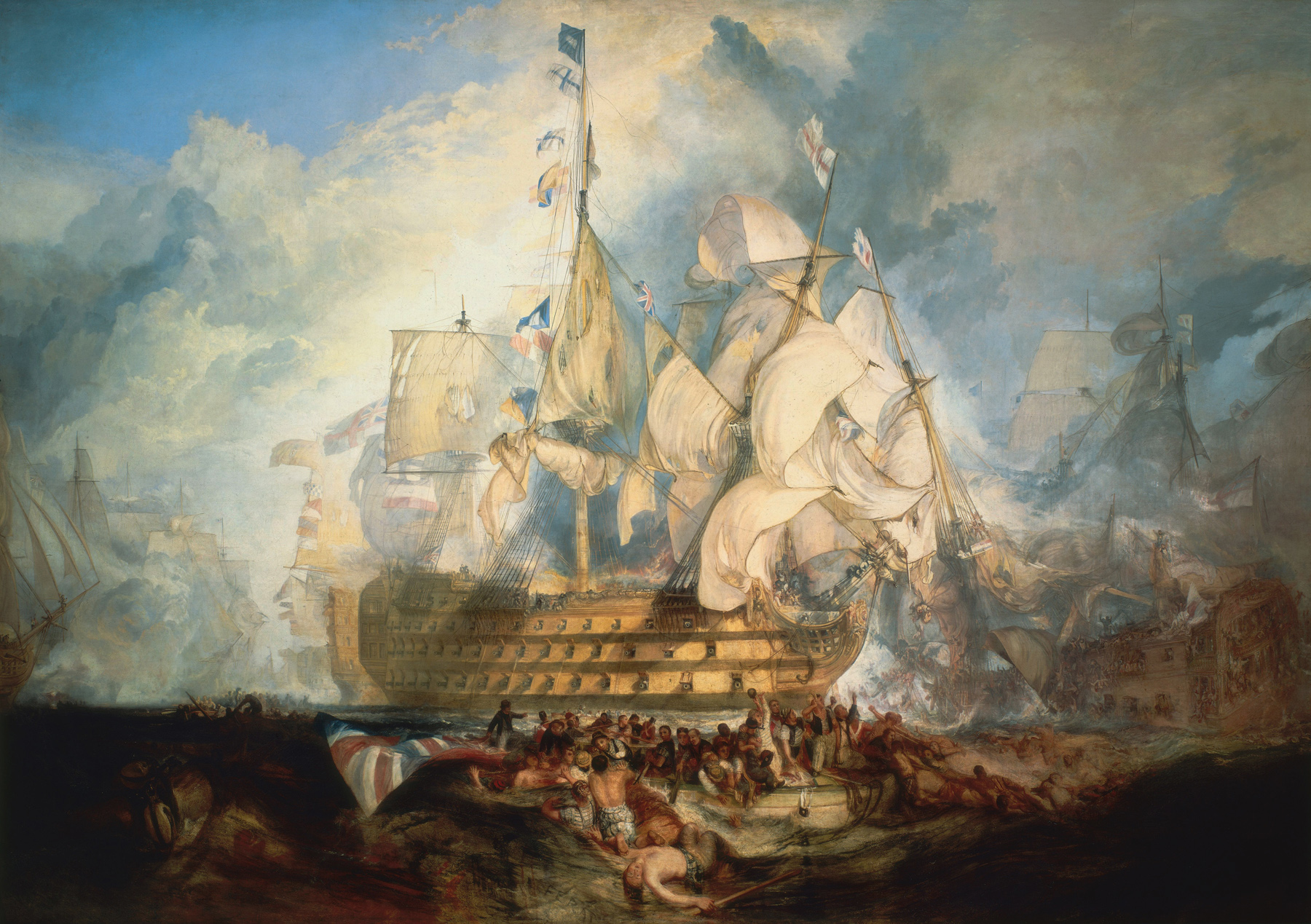
The Battle of Trafalgar by J. M. W. Turner

In 1811 he joined HMS Dragon, and in April was promoted to commander and given the sloop HMS Charybdis in which he captured two American vessels, the brig William Rathbone and the privateer Blockade in 1813 during the American War of 1812. In 1814–15 he participated in the British expedition against New Orleans and, on its failure, conveyed the despatches. In August 1815, with the Peace, he was paid off at Deptford and placed on half pay.

In the 1830s Clephan is recorded as living at 3 Salisbury Place in Newington, Edinburgh. He retired in 1840 with the rank of captain. He was one of only 16 press ganged men to attain the rank of Captain out of an estimated 300,000 men. Clephan retired to Edinburgh and died there in 1851 aged 83.

== Trafalgar flag ==
On 8 October 2009 The Times reported that the Union Jack which had been presented to Clephan after Trafalgar had been discovered in a drawer by a descendant and was to be auctioned. The 11 ft x 7 ft (3.5m x 2.1m) flag had been made by the crew out of 31 bunting panels and was riddled with holes made by cannonshot and bullets. As the only surviving Union Jack from the battle, it was expected to raise £15,000 but actually made £384,000 (A$687,774). Among the unsuccessful bidders was the National Maritime Museum.

== Blockade flag ==
A rare American flag of 17 Stars and 17 Stripes, flown by the U.S. Privateer Blockade descended in the Clephan family and surfaced in 2007, when it was sold in private sale to the Zaricor Flag Collection. Captain Clephan's ship, the H.M.S. Charybdis, captured the Blockade off of the island of Saba in the Caribbean on 31 October 1812. The ship was sold as a prize of war, and Captain Clephan kept the ship's flag. The flag is one of the earliest known Stars and Stripes in private hands, and the only 17-Star, 17-Stripe flag known to survive. The flag was sold in private sale to the Zaricor Flag Collection of Santa Clara, California. The Zaricor Flag Collection also purchased the Trafalgar flag, and both of Captain Clephan's early flags remain together.
