= Thomas Tate =

Thomas Tate may refer to:

- Thomas Tate (boxer) (born 1965), American boxer
- Thomas Tate (mathematician) (1807–1888), English mathematical and scientific educator and writer
- Thomas L. Tate, American politician in Virginia
- Thomas Tate (mayor), mayor of Birmingham, Alabama, 1872
- Tommy Tate (born 1956), American football coach
- Tommy Tate (musician) (1945–2017), American soul singer and songwriter
- Tom Tate (born 1959), mayor of Gold Coast, Australia

== See also ==
- Thomas Tait (disambiguation)
- Thomas Tate Tobin (1823–1904), American adventurer
