= HMS Grampus (1802) =

Ship of the line of the Royal Navy

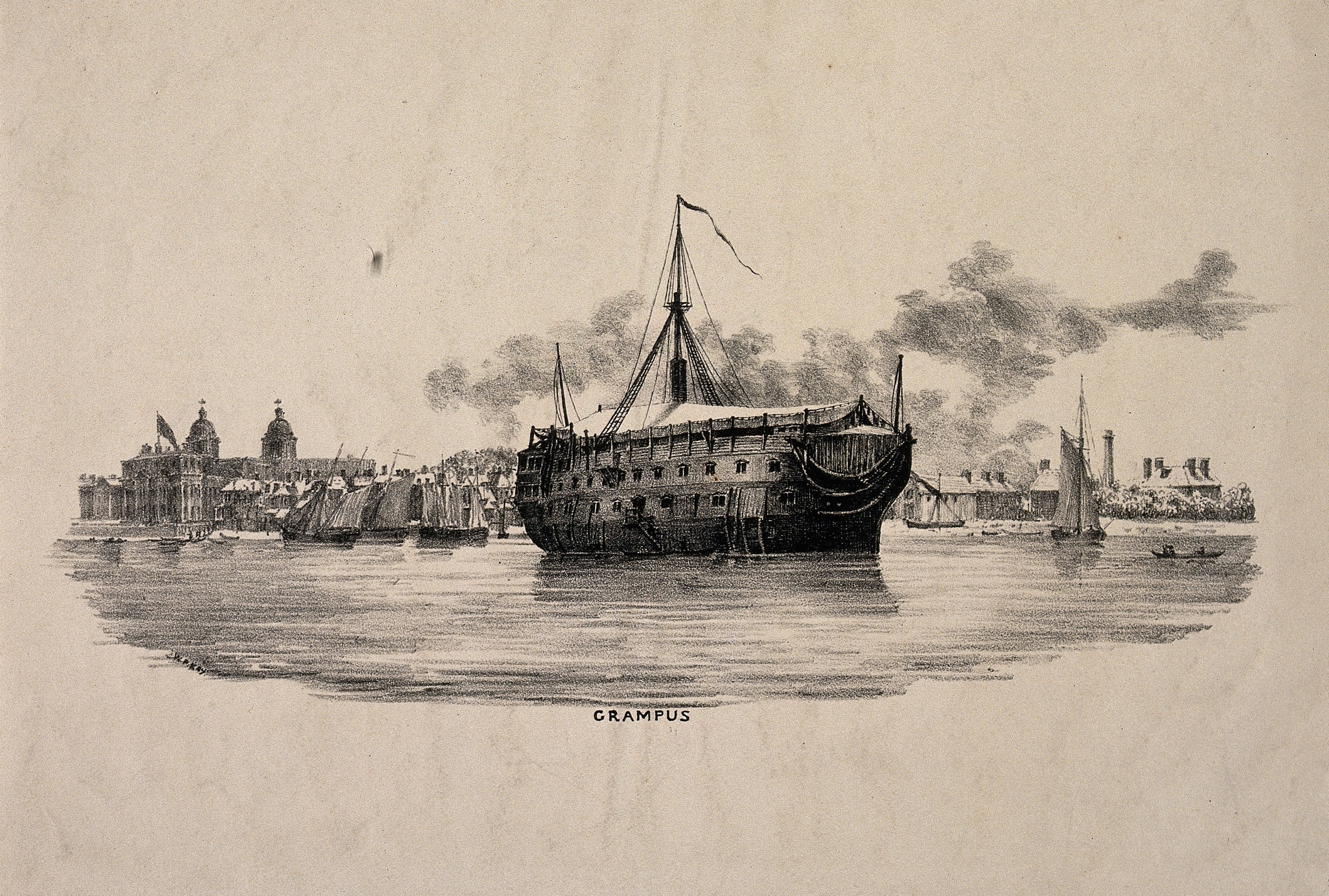
- H.M.S. Grampus lying off Deptford Creek, Greenwich

History

United Kingdom
- Name: HMS Grampus
- Ordered: 9 December 1790
- Builder: Portsmouth Dockyard
- Laid down: October 1792
- Launched: 20 March 1802
- Commissioned: March 1803
- Renamed: Built as Tiger; Renamed Grampus on 4 March 1802
- Fate: Sold in late 1832

General characteristics
- Class & type: Diomede-class ship of the line
- Tons burthen: 1,114 31/94 (bm)
- Length: 151 ft (46.0 m) (gundeck); 124 ft 7 1/2 in (38.0 m) (keel)
- Beam: 41 ft 10 1/2 in (12.8 m)
- Depth of hold: 17 ft 8 in (5.4 m)
- Sail plan: Full-rigged ship
- Complement: 343
- Armament: Lower gundeck: 22 × 24-pounder guns; Upper gundeck: 22 × 12-pounder guns; QD: 4 × 6-pounder guns; Fc: 2 × 6-pounder guns

HMS Grampus was a 50-gun fourth-rate ship of the line of the Diomede class of the Royal Navy. She was launched in 1802.

== Napoleonic Wars ==
She was commissioned in March 1803 at Portsmouth by Captain Hugh Downman, but in the following month command passed to Captain Thomas Gordon Caulfield. The ship was completed on 11 April 1803 and was ordered to the Downs on 7 May. As soon as her complement of men was completed and her bounty paid she sailed to join Admiral Edward Thornbrough's squadron off Goree.

On 19 May 1803 Jalouse captured Jong Jan Pieter. Jalouse shared the prize money with Grampus and the gun-brigs Censor and Vixen, with whom she had been in company.

Grampus returned to Portsmouth from Guernsey on 20 June to fit out for the East Indies and sailed with a convoy under her protection on 29 June. She carried £100,000 that the British East India Company was shipping to Bengal. On 16 October she was three days out of Rio and in company with the 74-gun third rate ship of the line HMS Russell. The East Indiamen they were escorting were Northampton, Lord Melville, Earl Spencer, Princess Mary, Anna, Ann, Glory, and Essex. Grampus spent 1805 in the East Indies.

In March 1806 Captain James Haldane Tait took command of Grampus, leaving HMS Sir Francis Drake, while Grampus was employed in India. Later she was stationed at the Cape of Good Hope, and returned home in the summer of 1809, escorting a large convoy of East India Company ships that Captain Tait had taken under his protection at St. Helena. He was presented by the Court of directors with a sum of money for the purchase of a piece of plate. Grampus was paid off because of her poor condition at the end of 1809.

Grampus underwent a repair and refit at Chatham between then and February 1810; in January 1810 she was recommissioned under the command of Captain William Hanwell.

On 28 April 1811 Grampus joined an East India convoy to see them through to the coast of Africa. On 30 September, back at Portsmouth, a court martial was convened on board Raisonnable in Sheerness harbour to try Lieutenant John Cheshire of Grampus. Captain Hanwell accused him of insolence, contempt, and disrespect on 11 April and similar conduct, coupled with neglect of duty, on 15 April. The court found the charges unfounded and acquitted Lieutenant Cheshire.

In November 1811 Commodore George Cockburn hoisted his broad pendant on board Grampus, preparatory to proceeding as one of three commissioners (the others were Thomas Sydenham and John Philip Morier) nominated by the Prince Regent to mediate between Spain and her colonies. They received final instructions on 2 April 1812, and arrived in Cádiz on 21 April to find the Spanish government and the majority of the Cortes resolved to retain absolute control over their South American possessions instead of taking a liberal view as proposed by the British government. He returned from his unsuccessful mission on 4 August.

== Post-war and fate ==
In 1816 Grampus was taken out of commission at Woolwich, where she was converted to a troopship and then used as a hospital ship at Deptford from 1820 until being lent to the Society for Destitute Seamen at Deptford in 1824. She served as a hospital ship until 1831. The society relocated at this time to Dreadnought and in due course provided the foundation for the UK's Hospital for Tropical Diseases and the Seamen's Dreadnought Hospital at Greenwich Hospital, later relocated to St Thomas's Hospital.
