= Douglas Tait =

Douglas Tait, Taitt or Tate may refer to:

- Douglas Tait (illustrator), Canadian children's book illustrator
- Douglas Tait (actor), American actor, creature performer, stuntman and producer
- Doug Taitt, baseball player
- Doug Tate, a character in the 1990 film Alice, played by William Hurt

== See also ==
- Robin Douglas Tait, New Zealand discus thrower
