= Melbourne McTaggart Tait =

Sir Melbourne McTaggart Tait
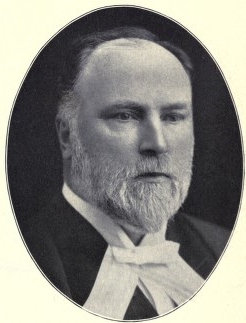
- Born: May 20, 1842; Melbourne, Canada East
- Died: February 19, 1917 (aged 74)
- Children: Thomas James Tait

Sir Melbourne McTaggart Tait, QC (May 20, 1842 – February 19, 1917) was a Canadian lawyer and judge.

Born in Melbourne, Canada East, he studied at St Francis College and received a Bachelor of Civil Law degree from McGill University in 1862. He was called to the Bar in 1863. He served as President of the Montreal Garrick Club after 1878. He was created a Queen's Counsel in 1882. He practiced law in Melbourne until moving to Montreal in 1870. In 1887, he was raised to the judicial Bench in the Province of Quebec. He was appointed chief justice of the Superior Court in the district of Montreal in 1894. He was made a Knight Bachelor at Queen Victoria's Jubilee, 1897.

In January, 1903, he headed a movement to erect Royal Victoria Hospital, a Children's Hospital in Montreal, as a memorial to Queen Victoria.

== Family ==
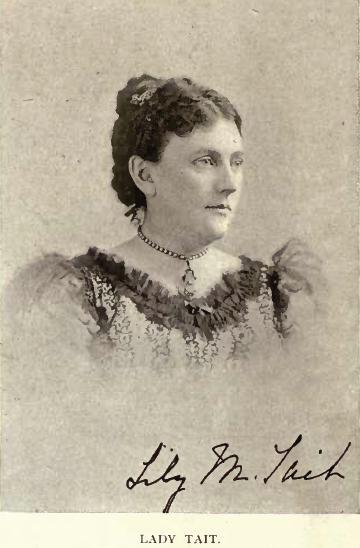
Lady Lily M. Tait by William Notman

Melbourne McTaggart Tait, then an advocate, married 1878 his second wife Lily M. Kaighn, daughter of Henry B. Kaighn, of Newport, R. I. Lady Tait performed as an actress, after her marriage, with the Montreal Garrick Club, of which her husband was President. The couple lived at 994 Sherbrooke Street, Montreal.

His eldest son, Melbourne MaGill Tait, was an Officer with the Canadian Grenadier Guards and served during World War One with the 245th Battalion (Canadian Grenadier Guards), and with the 87th Battalion (Canadian Grenadier Guards), CEF.

His other son, Thomas James Tait, was a railway commissioner.
