= Clarendon Park Congregational Church =

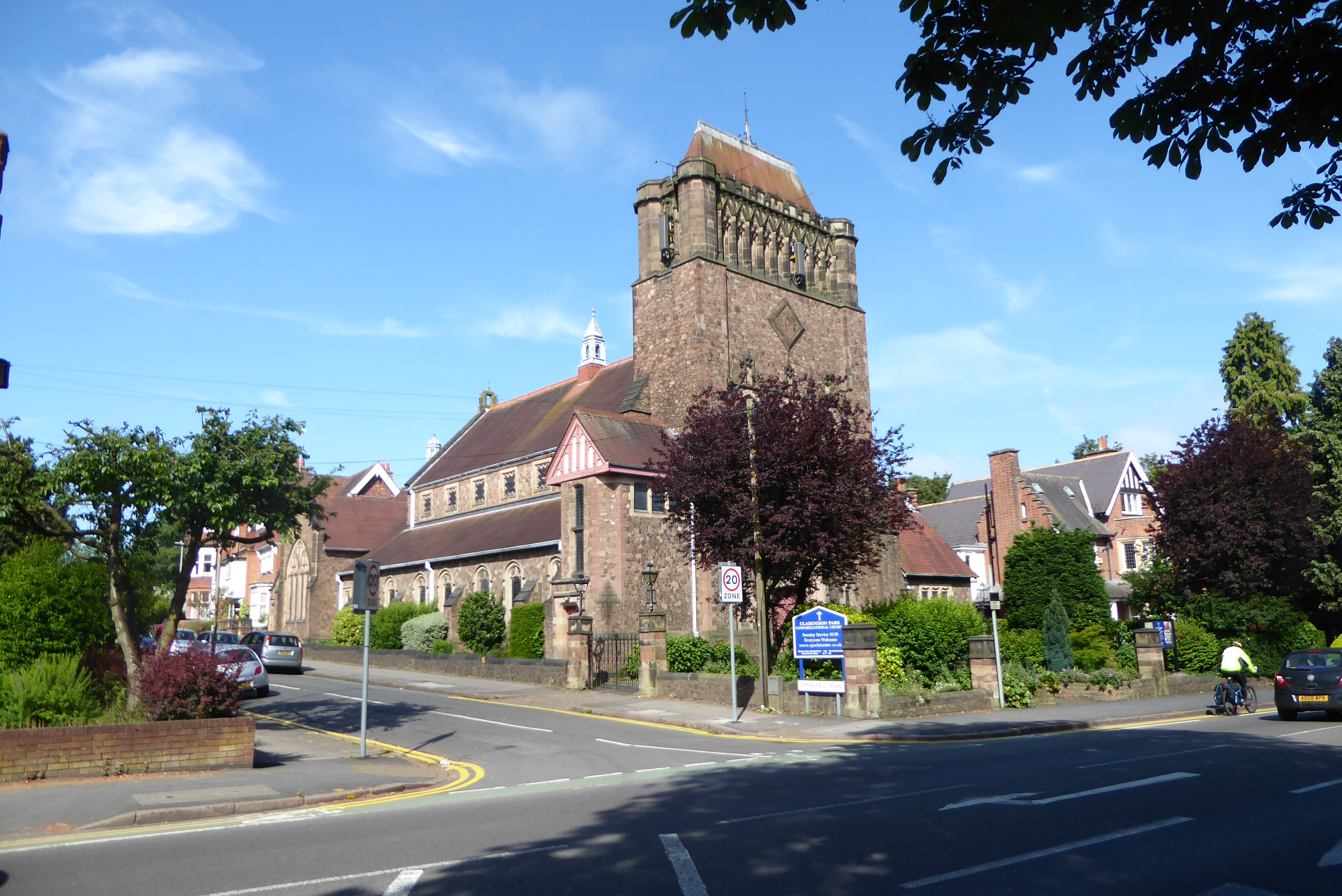
- Clarendon Park Congregational Church
- 52°37′05.6″N 1°06′36.7″W
- Location: London Road, Leicester, England
- Denomination: Congregational
- Website: www.clarendonparkcongregational.co.uk

History
- Status: open

Architecture
- Heritage designation: Grade II listed
- Designated: 1975
- Architect: James Tait (1834-1915)
- Style: Victorian Gothic
- Completed: 1886

Location of church in Stoneygate

The Clarendon Park Congregational Church is a Congregational church in Leicester, Leicestershire, England. It is located on London Road in the Stoneygate district near Clarendon Park.

Among the many places of worship in Leicester are Congregational churches. The first Congregational church in Leicester was founded in 1801. Numerous others were built in the 19th century. The Clarendon Park Congregational Church was designed by James Tait (1834-1915) and built in 1886. It is built of granite rubble with ashlar dressings and a roof of red tiles. It was designated a Grade II listed building (13613930) in 1975.

The church is part of the Congregational Federation.

== See also ==
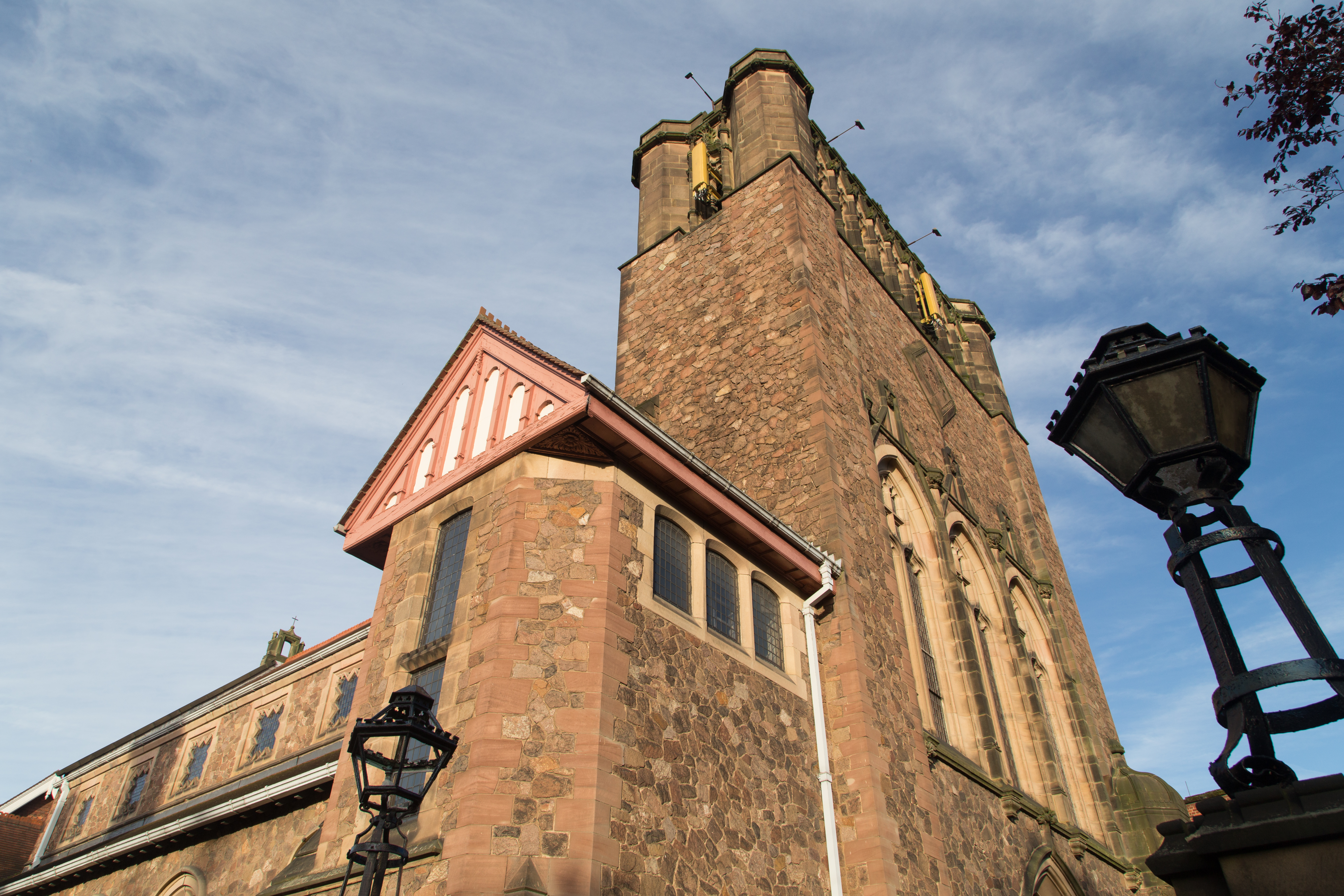
View to church tower

- List of Congregational churches
