= Paul Tait =

Paul Tait may refer to:

- Paul Tait (footballer, born 1971), English football midfielder, formerly at Birmingham City
- Paul Tait (footballer, born 1974), English football striker for Northwich Victoria, Bristol Rovers and others

== See also ==
- Paul Tate (disambiguation)
