= Alex Tait =

Alex or Alexander Tait may refer to:

- Alex Tait (cricketer) (born 1972), New Zealand cricketer
- Alex Tait (footballer) (born 1933), English footballer
- Alex Tait (rugby union) (born 1988), English rugby union player
- Alexander Tait (poet) (1720–c. 1800), Scottish poet
- Sandy Tait (Alexander Tait, 1873–1949), footballer
