= Thomas James Tait =

Sir Thomas James Tait (24 July 1864 – 25 July 1940) was a Canadian-born rail executive.

Born in Melbourne, Canada East, the son of Melbourne McTaggart Tait, Tait entered the service of the Grand Trunk Railway in 1880, and by 1903 he was manager of transportation with Canadian Pacific Railway company.

In March 1903 Tait was appointed Chairman of Commissioners of the Victorian Railways, Australia with a salary of £3000 per annum. During seven years in Victoria he turned an annual deficit into a profit, improved and increased the railways' rolling stock, and initiated electrification of the railways of Melbourne. Despite his initial opposition to electrification, his name became associated with the scheme, and Melbourne's first generation of purpose-built electric multiple units, the Tait trains, were named in his honour.

He resigned as VR chairman in 1910, was knighted the following year, and returned to Canada where he spent the rest of his life. He died at his summer home at St. Andrews, New Brunswick, in 1940.
