= Ficheux =

- Commune
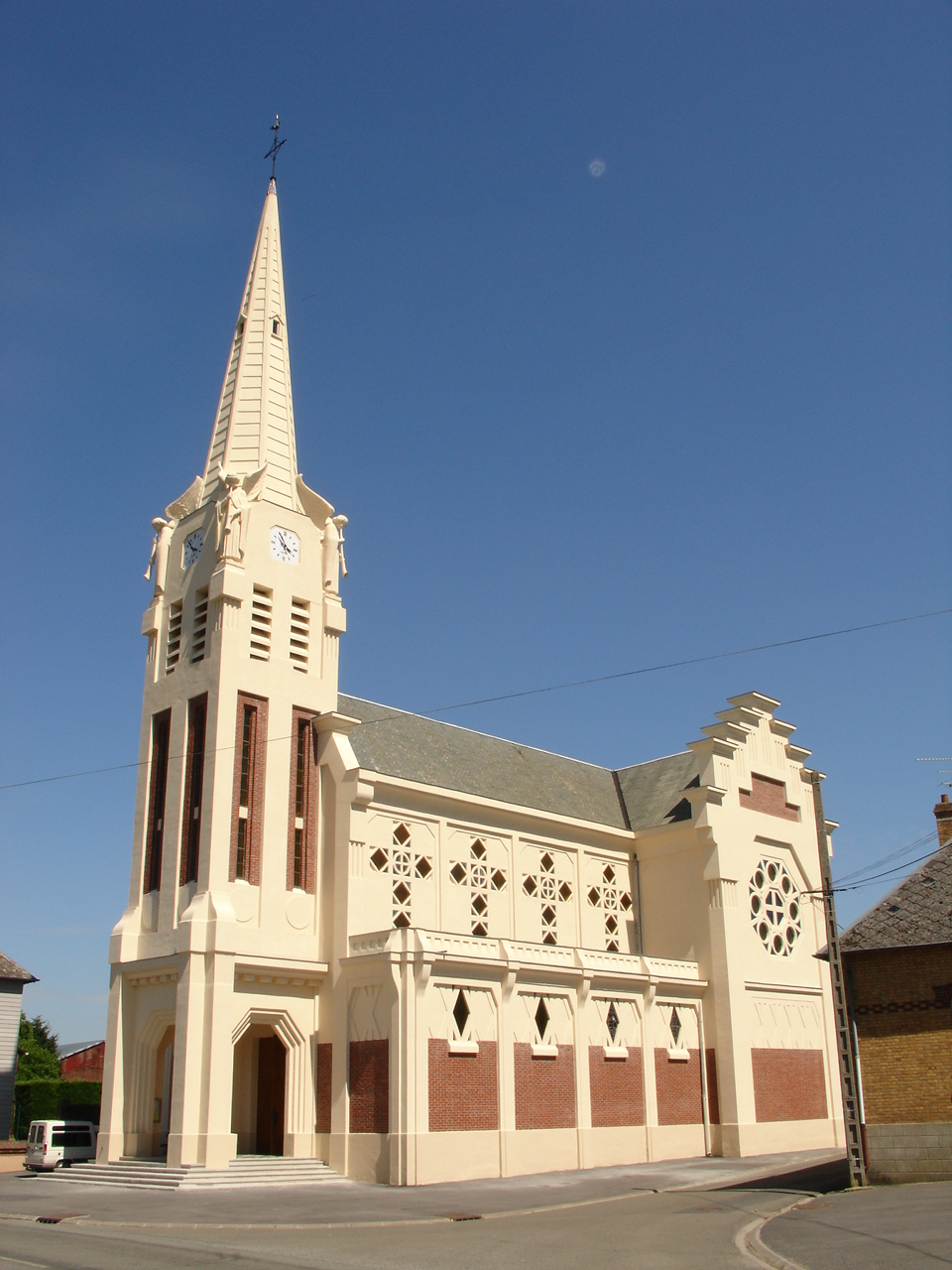
- The church of Ficheux

- Coat of arms
- Location of Ficheux
- Location within France Location within Hauts-de-France
- Coordinates: 50°13′38″N 2°44′23″E
- Country: France
- Region: Hauts-de-France
- Department: Pas-de-Calais
- Arrondissement: Arras
- Canton: Avesnes-le-Comte
- Intercommunality: CU Arras

Government
  - Mayor (2022–2026): David Tison
- Area^{1}: 5.83 km^{2} (2.25 sq mi)
- Elevation: 90 m (300 ft)
- Highest elevation: 113 m (371 ft)
- Lowest elevation: 78 m (256 ft)
- Population (2023): 496
  - Density: 85.1/km^{2} (220/sq mi)
- Time zone: UTC+01:00 (CET)
  - Summer (DST): UTC+02:00 (CEST)
- INSEE/Postal code: 62332 /62173
- ^{1} French Land Register data, which excludes lakes, ponds, glaciers > 1 km^{2} (0.386 sq mi or 247 acres) and river estuaries.

Ficheux (French pronunciation: [fiʃø]) is a commune in the Pas-de-Calais department in the Hauts-de-France region of France 6 miles (9.7 km) south of Arras.

== Population ==
The inhabitants are called Ficheusois in French.

Historical population
Year	Pop.	±% p.a.
1968	368	—
1975	415	+1.73%
1982	486	+2.28%
1990	586	+2.37%
1999	530	−1.11%
2007	545	+0.35%
2012	476	−2.67%
2017	523	+1.90%
2023	496	−0.88%
Source: INSEE

== See also ==
- Communes of the Pas-de-Calais department
