= 78th Battalion (Winnipeg Grenadiers), CEF =

78th Battalion
- Winnipeg Grenadiers
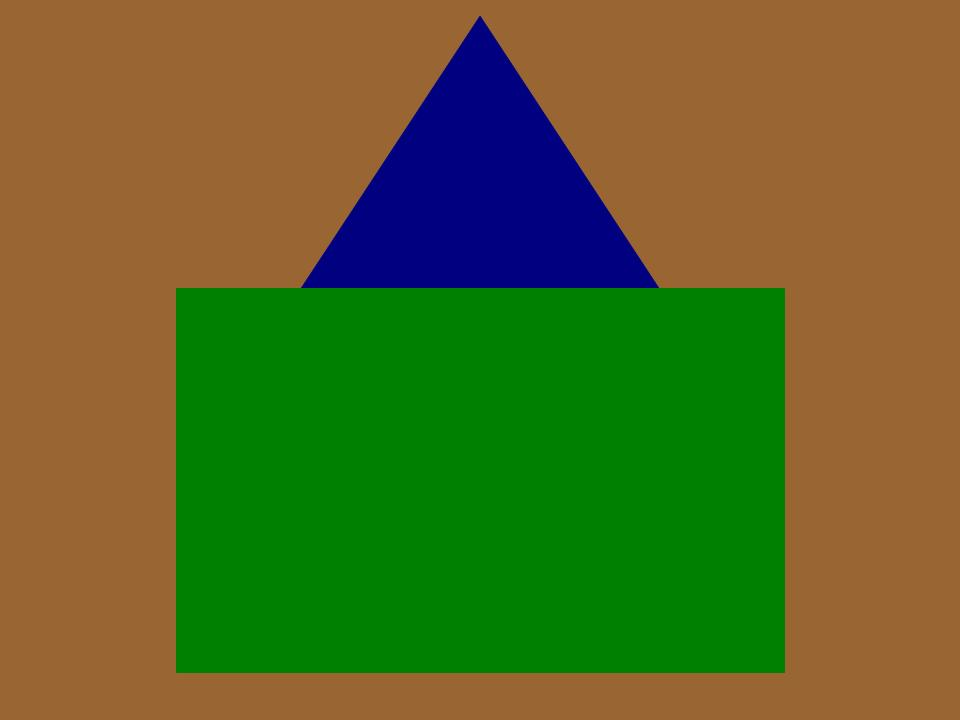
- The distinguishing patch of the 78th Battalion (Winnipeg Grenadiers), CEF.
- Active: 10 July 1915 - 15 September 1920

Commanders
- Commanders: Lt.-Col. J. Kirkcaldy, DSO
- Commanders: Lt.-Col. J.N. Semmens
- Commanders: Lt.-Col. J. Kirkcaldy, CMG, DSO

The 78th Battalion (Winnipeg Grenadiers), CEF was an infantry battalion of the Canadian Expeditionary Force during World War I. The 78th Battalion was authorized on 10 July 1915 and embarked for Great Britain on 20 May 1916. It disembarked in France on 13 August 1916, where it fought as part of the 12th Brigade, 4th Canadian Division in France and Flanders until the armistice. The battalion was disbanded on 15 September 1920.

== History ==
The 78th Battalion recruited in Winnipeg, Manitoba and the surrounding area and was mobilized at Winnipeg.

During the attack on Vimy Ridge the 78th was a followup battalion to the 38th, 72nd, and 73rd Battalions and was meant to exploit gains made by their initial attack. Unfortunately an intact German trench held up the attack and the 78th were hit by a German counterattack. The battalion lost 75 killed, 261 wounded and 159 missing.

The 78th Battalion had three officers commanding:

- Lt.-Col. J. Kirkcaldy, DSO, 22 May 1916 – 15 November 1917
- Lt.-Col. J.N. Semmens 16 November 1917 – 19 March 1918
- Lt.-Col. J. Kirkcaldy, CMG, DSO, 19 March 1918-Demobilization

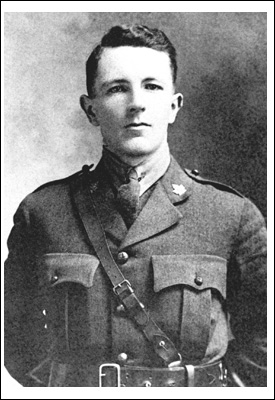
Lt. James Edward Tait, VC, 78th Battalion (Winnipeg Grenadiers), CEF.

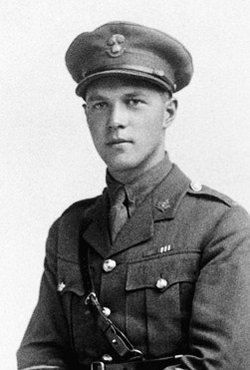
Lt. Samuel Lewis Honey VC, DCM, MM, 78th Battalion (Winnipeg Grenadiers), CEF.

Two members of the 78th Battalion were awarded the Victoria Cross. Lt. James Edward Tait was posthumously awarded the Victoria Cross for his actions on 9 August 1918 during the Battle of Amiens. Lt. Samuel Lewis Honey was posthumously awarded the Victoria Cross for his actions on 27 September 1918 during operations in the vicinity of Bourlon Wood. He had previously been awarded the Distinguished Conduct Medal and the Military Medal.

== Battle honours ==
The 78th Battalion was awarded the following battle honours:

- SOMME, 1916
- Ancre Heights
- Ancre, 1916
- ARRAS, 1917, '18
- Vimy, 1917
- Ypres 1917
- Passchendaele
- AMIENS
- Scarpe, 1918
- Drocourt-Quéant
- HINDENBURG LINE
- Canal du Nord
- VALENCIENNES
- SAMBRE
- FRANCE AND FLANDERS, 1916-18

== Perpetuation ==
The 78th Battalion, CEF is perpetuated by The Winnipeg Grenadiers, currently on the Supplementary Order of Battle.

== See also ==
- List of infantry battalions in the Canadian Expeditionary Force
