= James Sharp Tait =

Scottish electrical engineer

Sir James Sharp Tait (13 June 1912 – 18 February 1998) was a Scottish electrical engineer who was the first vice-chancellor of the City University, London.

== Life ==
Tait was born on 13 June 1912 in Ochiltree, Ayrshire, the son of a gardener. He left school at 14 to become an engineering apprentice and taking evening classes. He obtained an engineering qualification ARTC (with a distinction in electrical engineering) at the Royal Technical College, Glasgow, and stayed on as a lecturer. While working as a lecturer, he gained a double first class honours degree in Electrical and Mechanical Engineering, as an external student of London University and went on to get a PhD from Glasgow University.

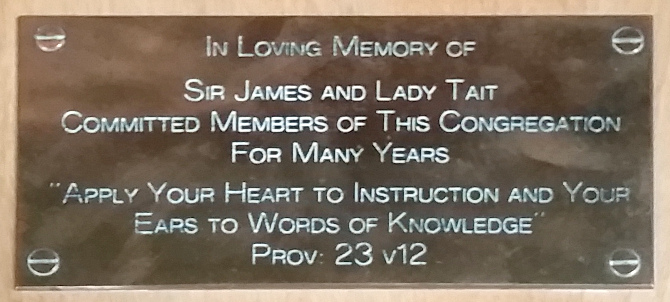
Memorial plaque formerly situated in Richmond Green United Reformed Church, now in Twickenham United Reformed Church

He married Mary Cassidy Linton (who survived him) in 1939. They had two sons and one daughter.

In 1946 he was appointed Head of the Electrical Engineering Department at Portsmouth Municipal College, but in 1947 took up the equivalent position at Northampton Polytechnic. In 1951, he became its Principal. In 1957 it became a College of Advanced Technology with Tait as its Principal, and in 1966 became the City University, London, at which point Tait became its first Vice-Chancellor. He retired in 1974.

Outside work, he was an Elder of the Presbyterian Church and was active in the Scouting movement.

He died on 18 February 1998, in Teddington in the London Borough of Richmond upon Thames.

== Honours ==
Tait was knighted in 1969 as a member of the Imperial Society of Knights Bachelor for services to education, and made Freeman of the City of London. He was a Chartered Engineer, and a Fellow of both the Institution of Electrical Engineers and the Institution of Mechanical Engineers. City University, London, awarded him an honorary Doctor of Science degree in 1974 and also named a building after him. He was awarded a Doctor of Laws by Strathclyde University, the successor to the Royal Technical College, Glasgow.

Academic offices
Preceded by New position	Vice-Chancellor, City University, London; 1966–1974	Succeeded by Edward Parkes
