= James Tait (architect) =

English architect

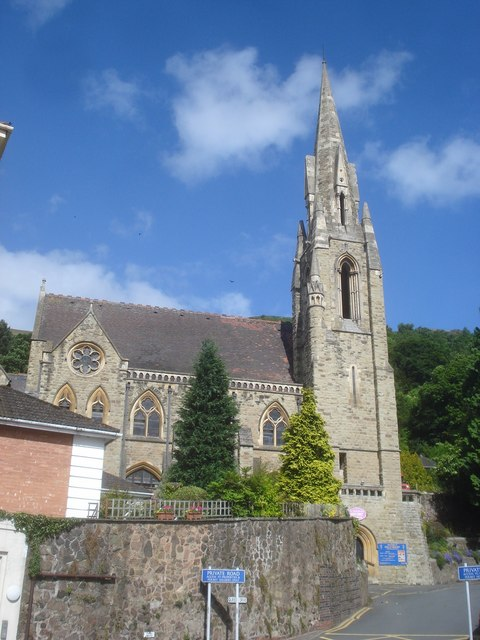
Congregational Church, Malvern 1875

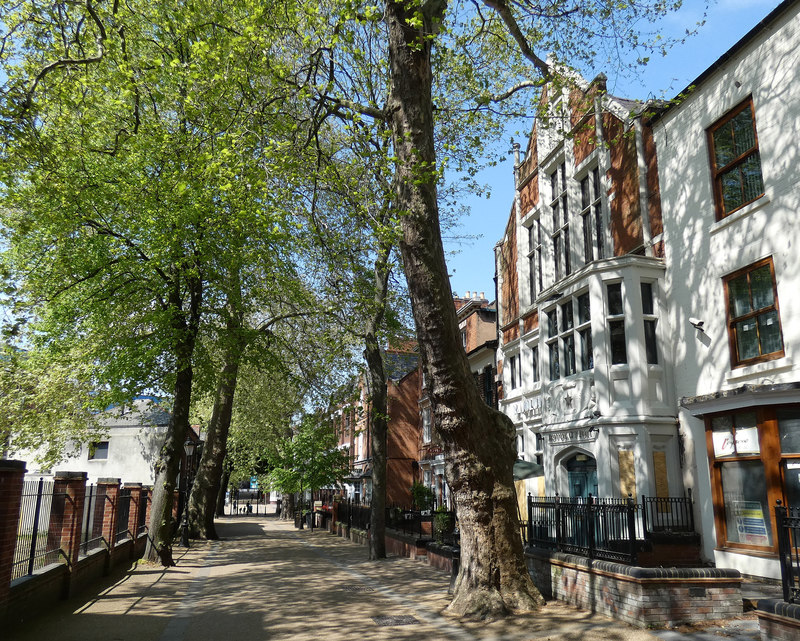
Sunday School Memorial Hall (now Revolution Bar), New Walk, Leicester 1883

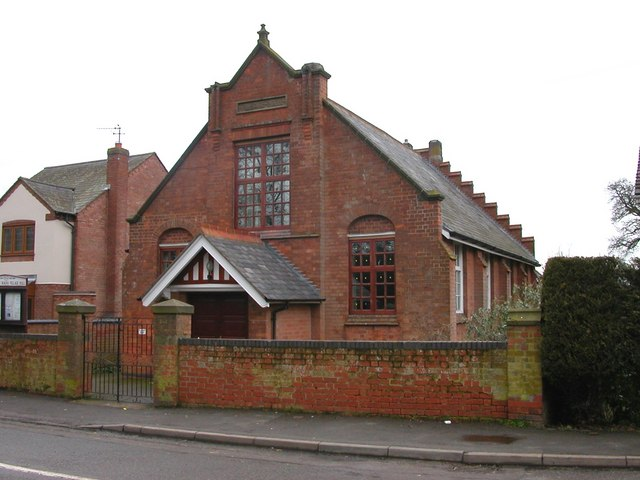
Claybrooke Village Hall 1894

James Tait FRIBA (10 February 1835 – 9 July 1915) FRIBA was an architect based in Leicester.

== Life and career ==
He was born on 10 February 1835 in Ashby-de-la-Zouch, the son of William Tait (1792–1864) and Katherine Adam (1800–1876).

He was a pupil of Edward Ellis from 1852 to 1856 and then his assistant until 1862. He was also a student in Royal Academy Schools in London in 1855. From 1862 to 1865 he served as managing assistant to George Bidlake in Wolverhampton.

He established his own practice in Leicester in 1865, later entering into partnerships with John Langham from 1874 to 1880 and then Albert Herbert from ca.1897 to ca.1900. He was president of the Leicester and Leicestershire Society of Architects from 1888 to 1890.

He was appointed a Fellow of the Royal Institute of British Architects in 1882.

In 1894 he suffered an accident when he was in the warehouses of Warner and Company on Pocklington's Walk, Leicester when he fell from the second floor down a flight of stairs.

He retired at the turn of the 20th century, and moved to live in Painswick, Gloucestershire where he died on 9 July 1915 where he left an estate valued at £3099 17s 7d. (equivalent to £275,507 in 2025).

== Works ==
- Congregational Chapel, Ashby-de-la-Zouch 1867 (restoration)
- St Stephen's United Presbyterian Church, London Road/Station Street, Leicester 1869
- United Presbyterian Church, Green Lane/Gower Street, Derby 1869
- Congregational Chapel, Gorefield, Cambridgeshire 1869
- Independent Chapel, St Peter's Hill, Grantham 1869-70
- Congregational Chapel, Long Sutton 1871 (extension and restoration)
- Baptist Chapel, Stroud, Gloucestershire 1873
- Public Hall, Wisbech 1874 (restoration and decoration)
- Congregational Church and Schools, Lower Barton Street, Gloucester 1874-75
- Congregational Church (later Holly Mount United Reformed Church), Queen's Drive, Malvern, Worcestershire 1875
- Wesleyan Chapel and Schoolrooms, Stroud, Gloucestershire 1875-76
- Congregational Church, Long Eaton, Derbyshire 1876
- St Peter's Church, Brooke, Rutland 1876-79 (restoration of the church excluding the chancel)
- House for William Stanyon, London Road, Leicester 1878 (with John Langham, demolished)
- Woodbank for T.H. Downing, 326 London Road, Leicester 1878 (with John Langham, demolished)
- Ilkeston Board Schools, Ilkeston, Nottinghamshire 1879-80
- Three houses for Alderman H.T. Chambers (15-19?) Stoneygate Road, Leicester 1880
- Lodges and Pavilion, Abbey Park, Leicester 1882 (pavilion destroyed by fire in 1960s)
- Park Hill Congregational Church, Nottingham 1883
- Sunday School Memorial Hall, New Walk, Leicester 1883
- Cornelius Winter Memorial Congregational Church, Painswick, Gloucestershire 1884
- Clarendon Park Congregational Church, London Road, Leicester 1886
- Co-operative Society Shoe Works, Dun's Lane, Leicester 1884
- Leicesters Preparatory School, Stoneygate, Leicester 1886
- Warehouses and shops for Reuben Barrow, Albion Street/Belvoir Street, Leicester 1886-87
- Adelaide Buildings (warehouse for Barrow Brothers), 40-46 Belvoir Street, Leicester 1887
- Village Hall, Claybrooke, Leicestershire 1894
- Congregational Church, Blaby Road, South Wigston 1896
- Independent Chapel, Kirby Muxloe, Leicestershire 1897
- St Mary's Mill for Bates and Co, Leicester.
- T.H. Downing and Co factory, Newarke Street, Leicester
