= Twickenham United Reformed Church =

- Twickenham United Reformed Church
- 51°26′33.9″N 0°20′36.7″W
- Location: First Cross Road, Twickenham, London l
- Country: England
- Denomination: United Reformed
- Previous denomination: Congregational
- Website: www.twickenhamurc.org.uk

Architecture
- Functional status: Active

Twickenham United Reformed Church, formerly Twickenham Congregational Church, on Twickenham Green at First Cross Road, Twickenham in the London Borough of Richmond upon Thames, is a United Reformed Church congregation. Its minister is Stephen Lewis.

The church's founder was Lady Amelia Shaw, second wife of Sir Robert Shaw, whose schoolroom (the site of the current church hall) was registered for public worship in 1835. The first chapel was built in 1844 and the premises were significantly rebuilt and enlarged in 1866.
