= Peter Tait (footballer) =

English footballer (1936–1990)

Personal information
- Full name: Peter Tait
- Date of birth: 17 October 1936
- Place of birth: York, England
- Date of death: 18 July 1990 (aged 53)
- Position: Forward

Senior career*
Years	Team	Apps	(Gls)
1955–1956	York City	3	(1)
1956–?	Scarborough		
- Bridlington Town
- Goole Town
1967–1968	Dunnington		
1968–?	Bridlington Trinity		
Total		3+	(1+)
- * Club domestic league appearances and goals

Peter Tait (17 October 1936 – 18 July 1990) was an English professional footballer who played as a forward in the Football League for York City, and in non-League football for Scarborough, Bridlington Town, Goole Town, Dunnington and Bridlington Trinity.
