= Bobby Tait (Cowdenbeath footballer) =

Scottish footballer (died 1950)

Personal information
- Full name: Robert Tait
- Date of birth: c. 1886
- Place of birth: Scotland
- Date of death: 1950 (aged 64)
- Place of death: Cowdenbeath, Scotland
- Position: Inside forward

Senior career*
Years	Team	Apps	(Gls)
- Glenbuck Cherrypickers
–1908	Carlisle United		
1908–1909	Motherwell	30	(5)
1909–1911	Nithsdale Wanderers		
1911–1922	Cowdenbeath	68	(17)
1920	Lochgelly United		
- Cowdenbeath Wednesday
- * Club domestic league appearances and goals

Robert Tait (died 1950) was a Scottish footballer who played in the Scottish League for Cowdenbeath and Motherwell as an inside forward.

== Personal life ==
After his retirement from football, Tait worked as a tailor in Cowdenbeath.

== Career statistics ==
Appearances and goals by club, season and competition
Club	Season	League			National cup		Total	
Club	Season	Division	Apps	Goals	Apps	Goals	Apps	Goals
Motherwell	1908–09	Scottish Division One	30	5	2	0	32	5
Cowdenbeath	1911–12	Scottish Division Two	17	5	11	0	28	5
Cowdenbeath	1912–13	Scottish Division Two	12	0	3	0	15	0
Cowdenbeath	1913–14	Scottish Division Two	19	5	6	0	25	5
Cowdenbeath	1914–15	Scottish Division Two	20	7	2	0	22	7
Cowdenbeath	1919–20	Central League	0	0	8	0	8	0
Cowdenbeath	1920–21	Central League	0	0	3	0	3	0
Cowdenbeath	Total		68	17	33	0	101	17
Career total			98	22	35	0	133	22

== Honours ==
Cowdenbeath

- Scottish League Division Two: 1913–14, 1914–15

Individual

- Cowdenbeath Hall of Fame
