= Tommy Tait (footballer, born 1879) =

Scottish footballer (1879–1942)

Personal information
- Full name: Thomas Somerville Tait
- Date of birth: 13 September 1879
- Place of birth: Carluke, Scotland
- Date of death: 2 October 1942 (aged 63)
- Place of death: Cleland, Scotland
- Position: Right half

Senior career*
Years	Team	Apps	(Gls)
- Cambuslang Rangers
1899–1903	Airdrieonians	67	(6)
1903–1906	Bristol Rovers	96	(1)
1906–1912	Sunderland	181	(3)
1912–1913	Dundee	22	(0)
- Jarrow
- Armadale

International career
1911	Scotland	1	(0)
- * Club domestic league appearances and goals

Thomas Somerville Tait (13 September 1879 – 2 October 1942) was a Scottish footballer, who played for Sunderland and the Scotland national football team as a right half.

== Club career ==
Raised in Lanarkshire, Tait began his career locally with Airdrieonians, then moved to England to join Bristol Rovers in 1903. He transferred to Sunderland three years later and made his debut for the club on 1 September 1906 against Newcastle United in a 4–2 win at St. James' Park. Tait played for Sunderland from 1906 to 1912, though he didn't win a trophy; he made 181 league appearances and scored 3 goals while at Roker Park. His later clubs included Dundee.

== International career ==
Having taken part in the Home Scots v Anglo-Scots trial match in 1909, Tait made his only appearance for Scotland against Wales in a 2–2 draw on 6 March 1911 at Ninian Park.

== See also ==
- List of Scotland international footballers with one cap
