= James Edward Tait =

Recipient of the Victoria Cross

James Edward Tait VC MC
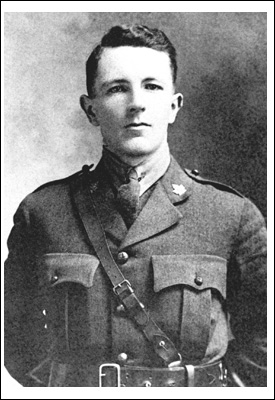
- Born: 27 May 1888; Dumfries, Scotland
- Died: 11 August 1918 (aged 30); Amiens, France
- Burial place: Fouquescourt British Cemetery
- Military career
- Allegiance: United Kingdom; Canada
- Branch: Canadian Expeditionary Force
- Service years: 1916 - 1918
- Rank: Lieutenant
- Units: Imperial Yeomanry; 78th Battalion, CEF
- Conflicts: World War I: Western Front; Hundred Days Offensive; Battle of Amiens †
- Awards: Victoria Cross; Military Cross

James Edward Tait VC MC (27 May 1888 – 11 August 1918), was a Scottish/Canadian recipient of the Victoria Cross, the highest and most prestigious award for gallantry in the face of the enemy that can be awarded to British and Commonwealth forces.

== Background ==
Tait was born on 27 May 1888 in Maxwelltown (Dumfries), Scotland to James Bryden Tait and Mary Johnstone. He married Jessie Spiers Aitken from California. He joined the Canadian Expeditionary Force in February 1916.

== World War I ==
Tait was 30 years old, and a lieutenant in the 78th (Winnipeg Grenadiers) Battalion, Canadian Expeditionary Force, during the First World War.

He died in action on 11 August 1918 in Amiens, France. He was awarded the VC for his actions that day.

=== VC citation ===
For most conspicuous bravery and initiative in attack. The advance having been checked by intense machine-gun fire, Lt. Tait rallied his company and led it forward with consummate skill and dash under a hail of bullets. A concealed machine gun, however, continued to cause many casualties. Taking a rifle and bayonet, Lt. Tait dashed forward alone and killed the enemy gunner. Inspired by his example his men rushed the position, capturing twelve machine guns and twenty prisoners. His valorous action cleared the way for his battalion to advance. Later, when the enemy counter-attacked our positions under intense artillery bombardment, this gallant officer displayed outstanding courage and leadership, and, though mortally wounded by a shell, continued to aid and direct his men until his death.

— The London Gazette, 24 September 1918

Lieutenant James Edward Tait was also awarded the Military Cross at the Battle of Vimy Ridge. The citation for this award is as follows: "For conspicuous gallantry and devotion to duty. Early in an assault he was wounded, and all the other officers killed or wounded, but he led his company with great fearlessness and determination through intense fire to the objective, and, although unable to walk, supervised its consolidation, finally crawling back alone, to leave for others the four bearers."

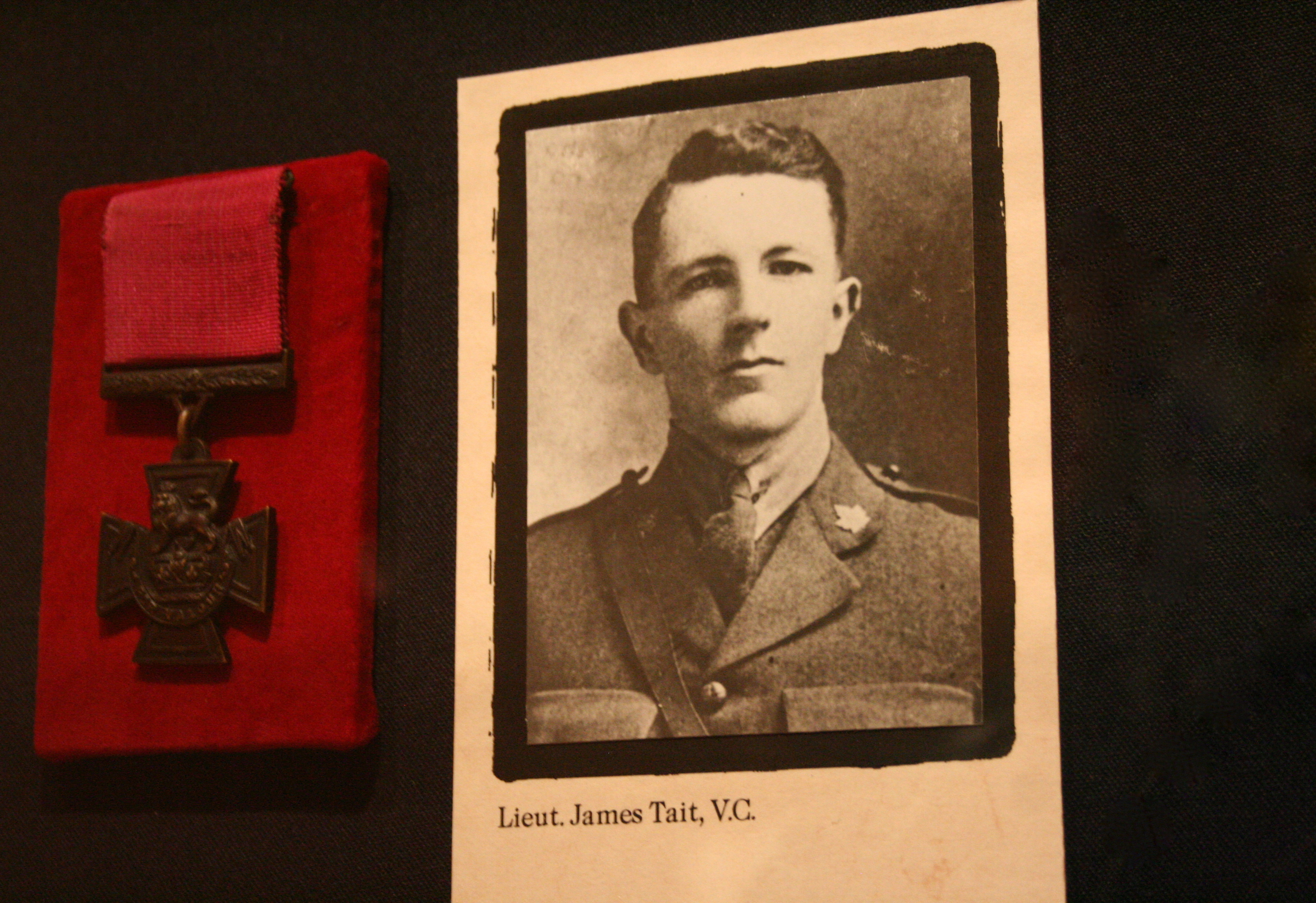
James Tait's Victoria Cross at the Glenbow Museum in Calgary

Due to his previous work with the Hudson Bay Railway survey, a siding by Van Hende Lake, Manitoba was named Jetait in his honour in 1953. Lieutenant Tait also has an island named after him in the Winnipeg River, Manitoba between the Pinawa Marina and the Pinawa Sailing Club.

Tait is buried at Fouquescourt British Cemetery which is located 16 miles south of Albert, France (special memorial, grave 8). His Victoria Cross is displayed at the Glenbow Museum in Calgary, Alberta, Canada.

== Bibliography ==
- Scotland's Forgotten Valour (Graham Ross, 1995)
- Gliddon, Gerald (2014) [2002]. Road to Victory 1918. VCs of the First World War. The History Press. ISBN 978-0750953610.
