= Tommy Tait (socialist) =

Thomas Tait (11 January 1881, Leith – 12 May 1941) was a Scottish socialist and industrial unionist active in the Revolutionary Socialist Party. He was noted as a powerful orator.

Tait was the son of William Campbell Tait and his wife, Isobel White. After a brief spell working as a labourer, he joined the Cameron Highlanders at the age of 18 in 1899. He served in the army for 12 years, and fought in the Boer War. It was during this period he came across a pamphlet by Daniel de Leon which led him to become a convinced socialist. In 1912, he joined the Socialist Labour Party (SLP) after he had left the army. He was in Edinburgh at the time where the SLP had their headquarters. Almost immediately he followed the British Section of the International Socialist Labour Party when it broke away from the SLP. He was involved in setting up the Workers' International Industrial Union in Edinburgh. He was employed as a driver and was also active in the Scottish Horse and Motormen’s Union. He stood for the local council 17 times, but was never elected.

His son, William Campbell Tait, donated Tommy's archive to the University of Stirling.
