= Tommy Tait (footballer, born 1908) =

English footballer (1908–1976)

Personal information
- Full name: Thomas Tait
- Date of birth: 20 November 1908
- Place of birth: Hetton-le-Hole, England
- Date of death: 1976 (aged 67–68)
- Height: 5 ft 10 1/2 in (1.79 m)
- Positions: Striker; inside forward

Senior career*
Years	Team	Apps	(Gls)
1923–?	Sunderland	0	(0)
- Hetton
1927	Middlesbrough	0	(0)
1927	Southport	15	(10)
1927–1930	Manchester City	61	(43)
1930–1931	Bolton Wanderers	9	(4)
1931–1934	Luton Town	84	(50)
1934	Bournemouth & Boscombe Athletic	12	(5)
1934–1939	Reading	144	(79)
1939–1946	Torquay United	3	(0)
Total		328	(191)
- * Club domestic league appearances and goals

Thomas Tait (20 November 1908 – 1976) was an English footballer.

He played for Sunderland, Hetton, Middlesbrough, Southport, Manchester City, Bolton Wanderers, Luton Town, Bournemouth & Boscombe Athletic, Reading and Torquay United.

When Tommy joined Reading, £200 of his fee was provided by the supporters club. He scored a hat-trick on debut away at local rivals Aldershot, and was top scorer for the club on his first four seasons. He was also involved in a rare sending off when he punched a Millwall defender on Boxing Day 1934.
