= Douglas Tait (illustrator) =

Canadian children's book illustrator

- Occupation: Children's literature illustrator
- Awards: Amelia Frances Howard-Gibbon Illustrator's Award (1981)

Douglas Tait is a Canadian children's-book illustrator.

== Award ==
He won the Amelia Frances Howard-Gibbon Illustrator's Award in 1981 for illustrating The Trouble with Princesses, written by Christie Harris.

== See also ==
- List of Canadian artists
- List of illustrators
