= James Haldane Tait =

Royal Navy officer

Rear-Admiral James Haldane Tait (1771 – 7 August 1845) was a British naval officer who served in the French Revolutionary and Napoleonic Wars.

== Life ==
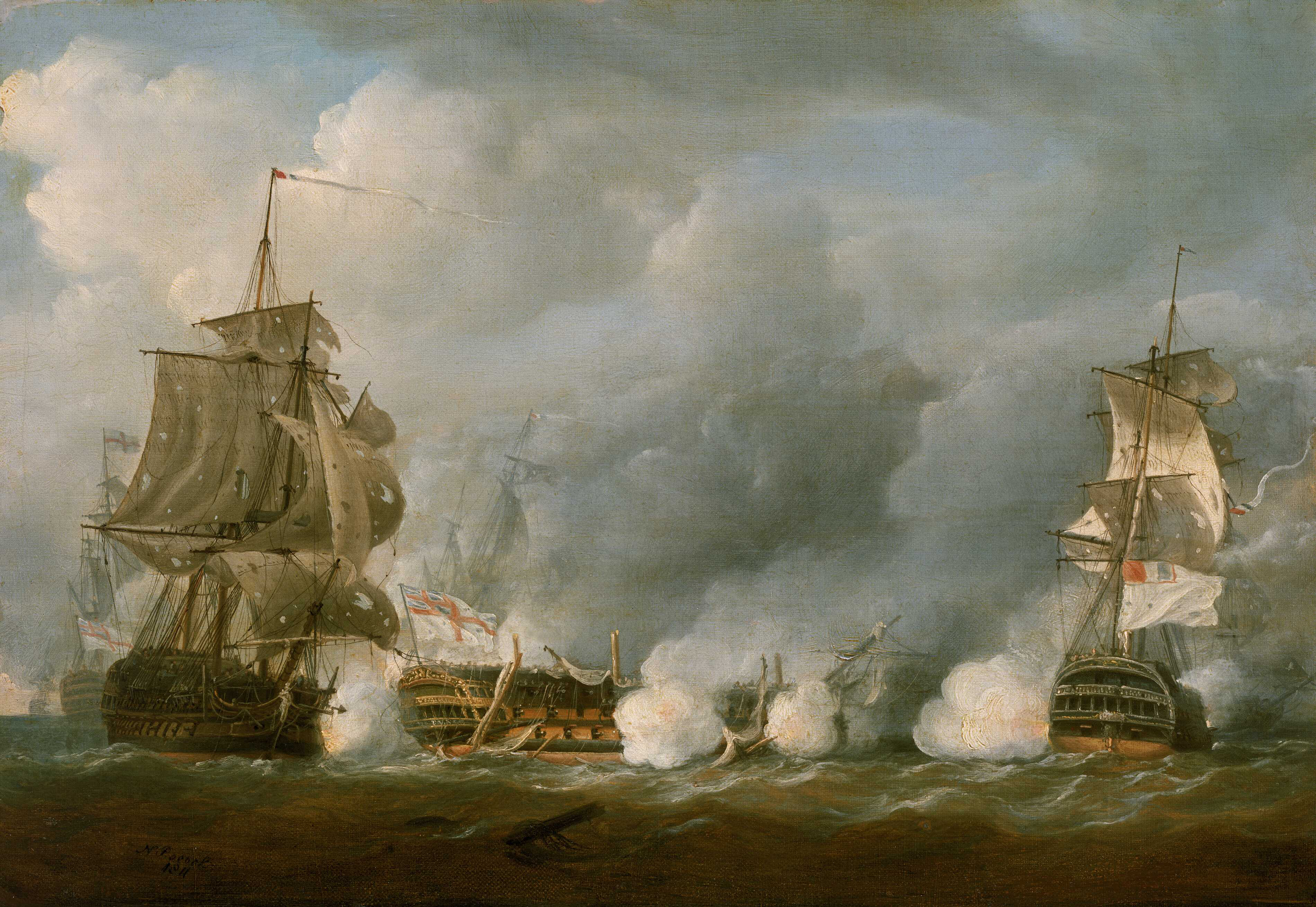
HMS Defence, which Tait served on

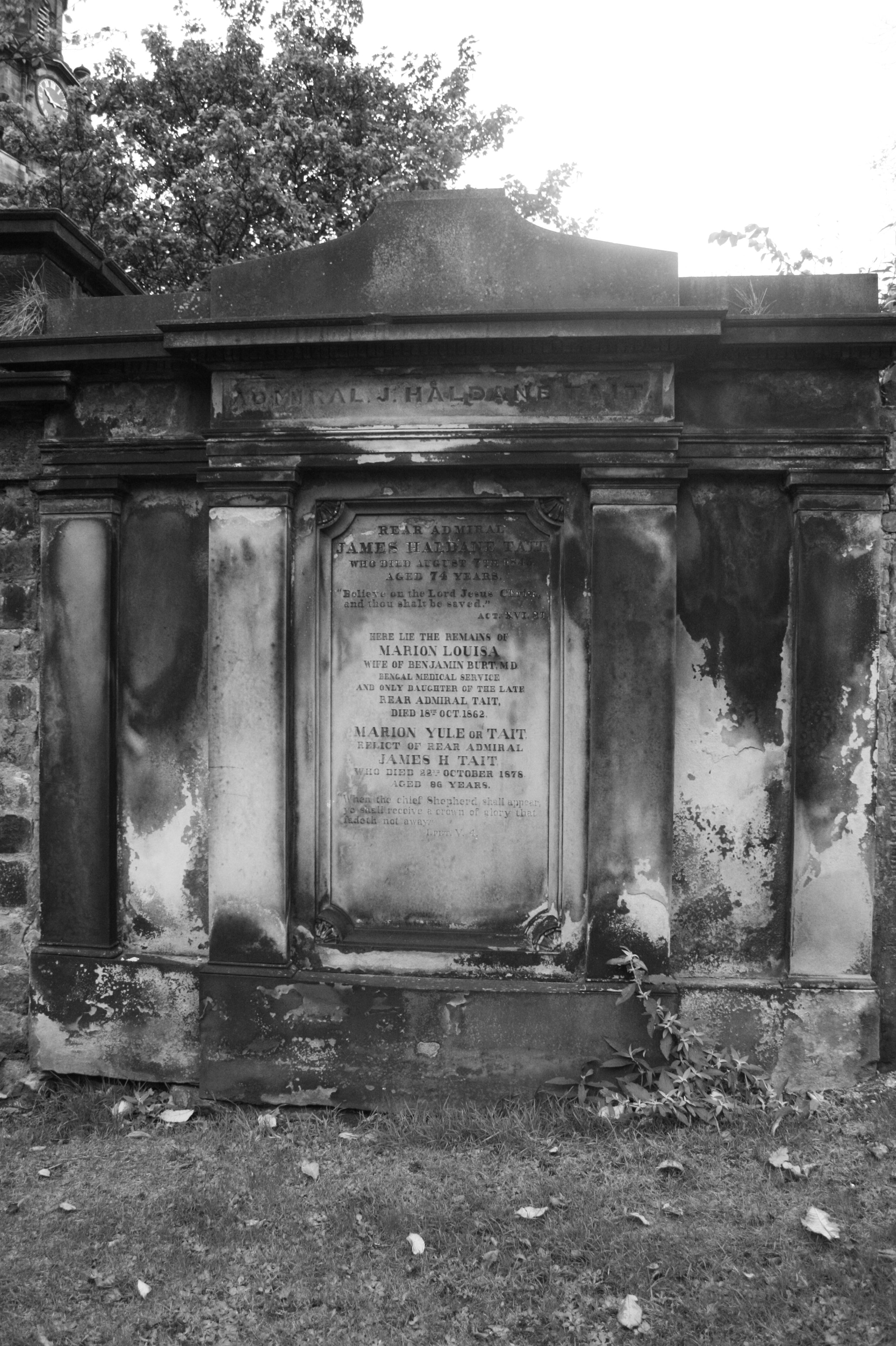
Tait's grave in St Cuthbert's Church, Edinburgh

James Haldane was born in Glasgow the son of William Tait, a merchant in the Trongate. His mother Margaret Duncan was the sister of Admiral Adam Duncan. He joined the Royal Navy in March 1783 aged 12 as captain's servant on HMS Edgar. He also saw service on his uncle's ship HMS Ganges. On both ships they mainly remained in the Portsmouth area.

From 1787 he joined the Bombay Marine of the East India Company but on the rise of military tensions between Britain and Spain he rejoined the Navy in September 1790. He was now a midshipman on HMS Defence, an older and more battle-hardened ship than his earlier commissions. In October 1793 he transferred with the ship's captain, Captain G. Murray, to HMS Duke. In April 1794, when Murray was promoted to rear-admiral, he followed him to HMS Resolution and sailed to North America.

Under Admiral Murray he served as an acting lieutenant to Captain Hardy on HMS Thisbe and had a brief spell with Captain Roddam Home on HMS Africa. He was commissioned as a full lieutenant on 6 July 1796. Whilst with Murray he saw action against the American fleet. As a lieutenant he moved to HMS Cleopatra. The Cleopatra saw great action in 1796 with Tait present: capturing the French ships Aurore, Hirondelle, Basque and Nouvelle Eugenie.

From 1797 to 1799 he served again with his uncle defending the English Channel. In 1799 he was given command of HMS Jane. This small (14-gun) lugger gained a huge reputation under Tait patrolling the British and European coast, capturing 56 French or Dutch vessels and by 1801 Tait was growing in fame. Scotland reacted very well to this and he was given the Freedom of the City variously to Dundee, Banff and Aberdeen. In April 1802 he was promoted to commander. After some time with the Sea Fencibles at Dunbar, he was given command of HMS Volcano in October 1803 protecting Dungeness.

In 1805 he was captain of HMS Sir Francis Drake in the East Indies.

He took over as captain of HMS Grampus in March 1806 and was stationed in India and the Cape of Good Hope. The ship returned to Britain in 1809, and Tait spent some years ashore. In 1814 he took charge of HMS Venus patrolling the Norwegian fjords. In 1815 he saw a year's service with HMS Junon (a renamed captured French vessel) in the West Indies and his final charge in 1816 was HMS Pique, also in the West Indies.

In March 1817 he was invalided out of the navy, having caught yellow fever.

He retired to 6 Bellevue Crescent in Edinburgh's Second New Town. His promotion to Rear-Admiral of the Blue was largely in retrospective recognition of his worth and he did not see any operational use of the rank.

He died on 7 August 1845. He is buried in St Cuthberts churchyard in central Edinburgh just west of Princes Street Gardens. The grave lies on the small mound to the south-west of the church, backing onto the upper vaults.

== Family ==
He was married three times: firstly to Mary Duncan (probably his cousin); secondly Miss Stewart Cunninghame; and lastly to Marion Yule (d.1878). He had one son Alexander Duncan Tait (1813–1881)
