= Robert Tait (Royal Navy officer) =

Scottish Royal Navy officer

Captain Robert Tait (born 23 January 1793) was a Scottish officer in the Royal Navy.
