= Henbury Hall, Cheshire =

Henbury Hall
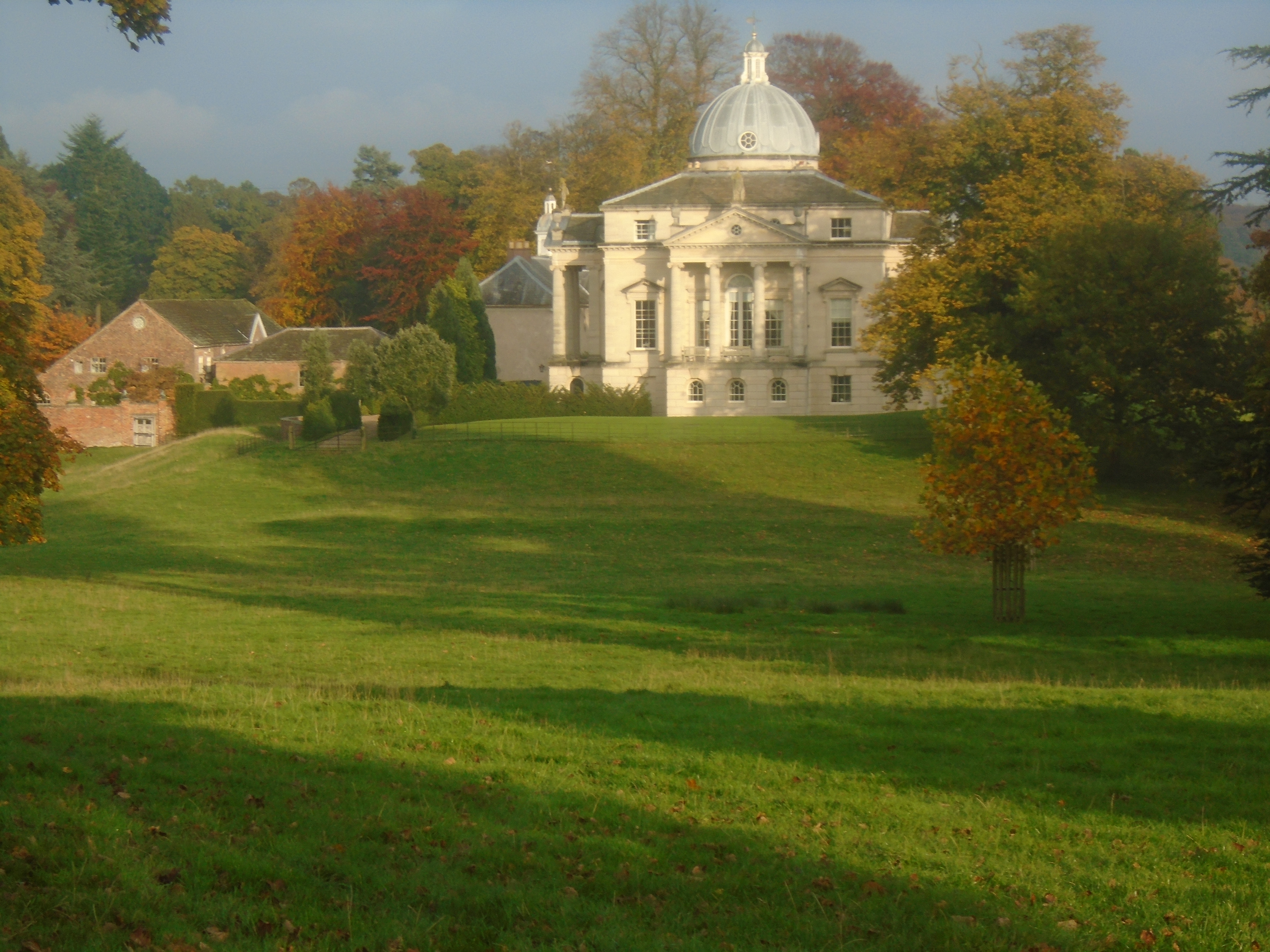
- Interactive map of the Henbury Hall area

General information
- Type: Country house
- Architectural style: New Classical
- Location: Henbury, Cheshire, UK
- Coordinates: 53.25318°N 2.19739°W
- Construction started: 1984
- Completed: 1986
- Client: Sebastian Ferranti

Design and construction
- Architect: Julian Bicknell
- Other designers: Felix Kelly

Henbury Hall is a country house about 1 mile (1.6 km) southwest of the village of Henbury in Cheshire, England. The present house was built during the 1980s in New Classical style. Designed by Julian Bicknell, it is based on Andrea Palladio's Villa Rotonda.

== History ==
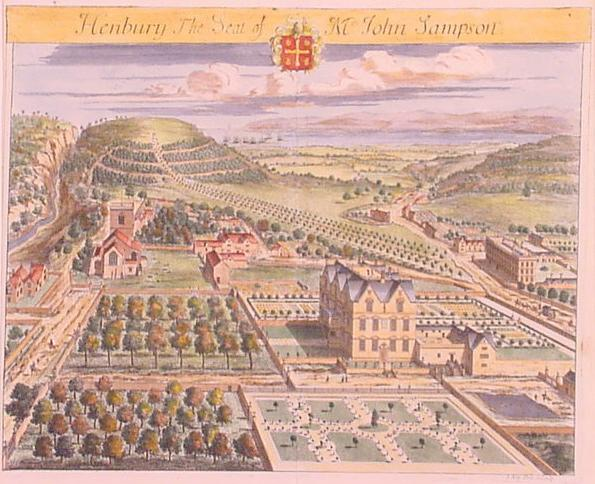
Depiction of Henbury Hall in the 1707 Britannia Illustrata

A hall known as Henbury Hall existed in the area in the 17th century.

A Neoclassical style hall was built on the present site in 1742. It was sold by Sir William Meredith to John Bower Jodrell in 1779 for £24,000 and passed on to his son Francis Bower Jodrell in 1796. John Charles Ryle, the banker and MP for Macclesfield, bought it in 1835 for £54,000 and sold it following his bankruptcy to Thomas Marsland, first MP for Stockport (1776–1854) in 1842. The hall was remodelled in a more severe Neoclassical style in the early part of the 19th century, and then stuccoed and drastically reduced in size in the 1850s. The estate passed to his grandson Edward Marsland (died 1857) whose widow Jane Marsland was forced to sell after a disastrous flood in 1872.

It was bought for £9000 and extensively remodelled by local silk manufacturer Thomas Unett Brocklehurst. In 1876 Brocklehurst reputedly imported a pair of grey squirrels from America and released them into the estate with ultimately disastrous results for the native red squirrel. The Brocklehurst family remained in residence at Henbury for several generations.

In 1957 the estate was bought by Sir Vincent de Ferranti. (Note: Sir Vincent was the son of Sebastian Ziani de Ferranti, creator of the electrical engineering firm Ferranti.) He demolished the existing house and commissioned the architect Harry Fairhurst to convert the stable block for his own residential use. (Note: The converted stable block is recorded in the National Heritage List for England as a designated Grade II listed building.) After the death of Sir Vincent in 1980, his son Sebastian and the designer Felix Kelly, who had already been involved with some work on the Henbury estate, came up with the idea of creating a house in the style of a Palladian temple. Kelly executed an oil painting based on Villa Rotonda, a house near Vicenza built in 1552 and designed by Andrea Palladio. Sebastian then commissioned the architect Julian Bicknell to create a design similar to Kelly's painting. The new building was completed in 1986. Sebastian lived there with his wife Naomi, until her death in 2003. Together, they designed the interior with the help of David Milnaric. They also worked together on the gardens. He was married again briefly before his death on 15 October 2015. In 2018 the house and estate was put on the market for an undisclosed sum.

== Architecture ==
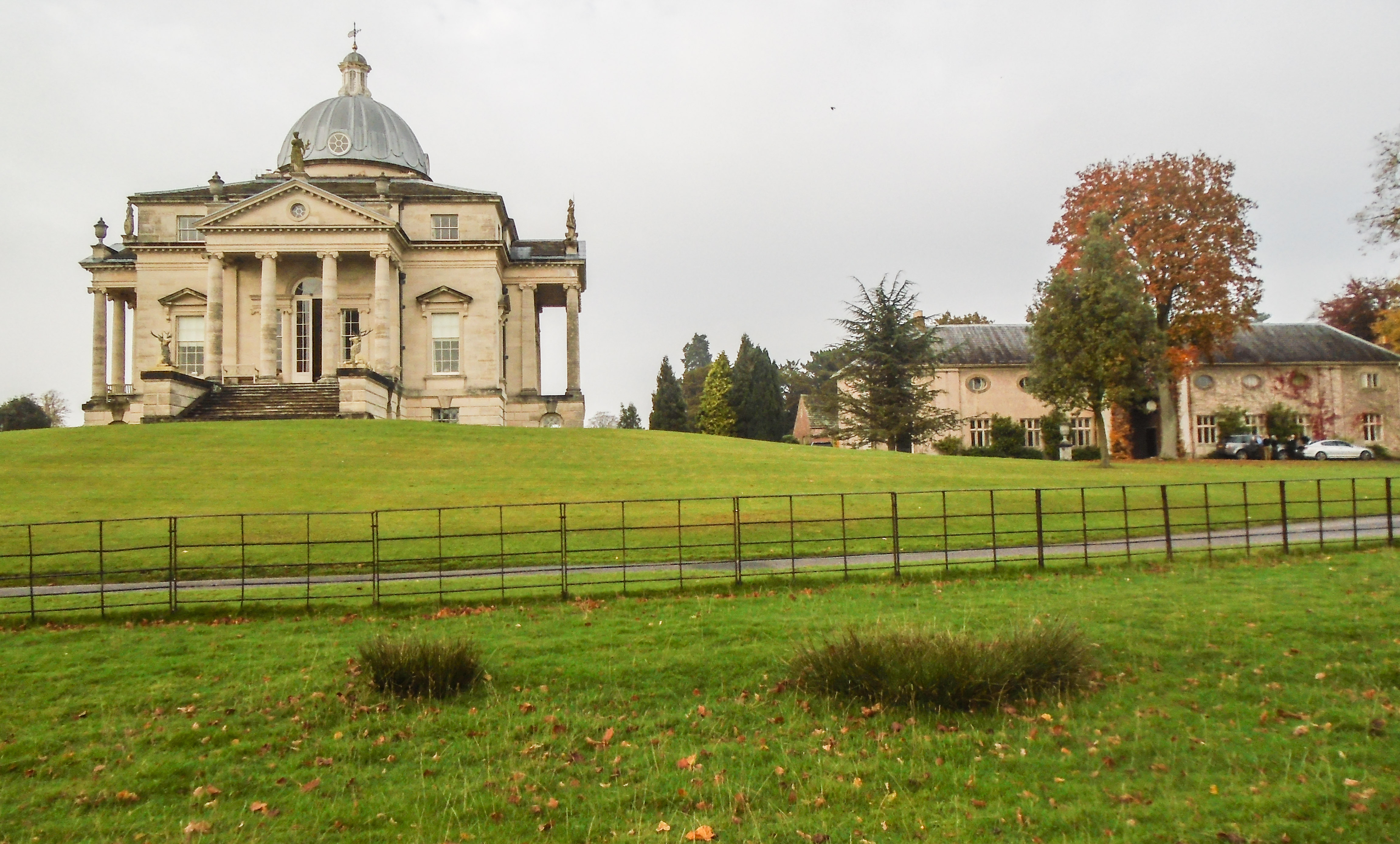
The neo-Palladian house (left) and converted stables (right)

=== Exterior ===
Henbury Hall is constructed in brick and concrete which is faced with limestone from northeast France, with the roof in local stone. The dome is in lead, with a lantern in gunmetal and gilded copper. It has a plan of 56 feet (17 m) square, with four-way symmetry. There is a rusticated basement, and an Ionic portico on each side. A stairway leads up to the south front. Within each portico is a Venetian window. Life-size statues by Simon Verity stand on the pediments. Topping the house is a dome surmounted by a lantern.

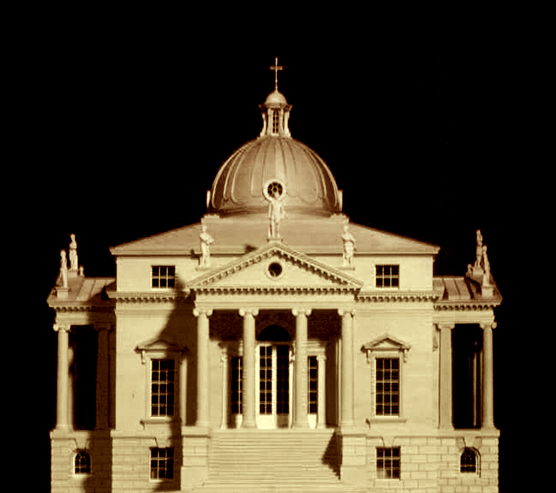
Design development model, made in yellow cedar-wood by Richard Armiger in 1983-84 for Sebastian de Ferranti and Julian Bicknell, to guide construction of Henbury Hall, scale 1:50

=== Interior ===
The dining and drawing rooms are on the first floor, the piano nobile, on the east and west sides of a central great hall which is open to the dome, with smaller rooms in the corners. In the basement is a central hall surrounded by kitchens and accommodation for the staff. The upper floor has a gallery overlooking the great hall, with six bedrooms with bathrooms and dressing rooms. The great hall has a floor of English limestone and Purbeck marble. The internal decoration is by David Mlinaric, with carving of the doorcases by Dick Reid of York.

=== Comparison ===
Although Henbury Hall is based on the Villa Rotonda, there are significant differences. The major difference is that it has a smaller plan, with porticos of four rather than six columns. Venetian windows have been inserted behind the porticos. The entrance is at basement, rather than at piano nobile, level, and the profile of the dome is higher.
