= Gervase Jackson-Stops =

Historian and journalist

Gervase Frank Ashworth Jackson-Stops OBE (26 April 1947 – 2 July 1995, in London) was an architectural historian and journalist.

== Education ==
He was educated at Harrow and later won an exhibition to Christ Church, Oxford and here he was amused that his tutor put down on his list as required reading Burke's Peerage. His grandfather, Herbert Jackson-Stops, founded the eponymous and up-market estate agency.

He trained with a Museums Association Studentship at the Victoria and Albert Museum from 1969 until 1971 and as a research assistant at the National Trust from 1972 until 1975.

== National Trust ==
He was the Architectural Adviser to the National Trust for over 20 years, earning enormous respect as result of which he broke fresh ground when he fought for the rescue of the decaying Northamptonshire manor-house at Canons Ashby. It was the first time that Government funds, rather than the traditional family endowment, were used to save an historic house.

He was also the curator of various exhibitions including "The Treasure Houses of Britain", held at the National Gallery of Art, Washington, D.C. in 1985–86. A television series was made in conjunction, narrated by John Julius Norwich. He also contributed numerous scholarly architectural articles to Country Life magazine between 1973 and 1995. He was appointed OBE in 1987.

== The Menagerie ==
Thumb

Jackson-Stops developed a unique home in The Menagerie, a Grade II listed building at Horton, Northamptonshire, part of the estate buildings for the now demolished Horton House and seat of the Earl of Halifax. The building is a one-storey building with corner pavilions and a raised central area. The surrounding windows are by Gibbs. The work has most recently been attributed to Thomas Wright who undertook work for Lord Halifax in the 1730s. The saving of this unusual building was Jackson-Stops's own private achievement; when he first heard of the property in 1972, he found an architectural dream; here he restored one of the finest English Rococo plasterwork rooms, complete with Father Time, the Four Winds, and above the cornice 12 large-scale medallions of the Zodiac. Later on in the 4.5-acre (1.8 ha) gardens he added two further follies and, with his partner Ian Kirby, created a romantic English garden which incorporated both a formal period-design an exciting modern planting.

For Jackson-Stops, the Menagerie was his own country house in miniature and in the manner of a country house and in the tradition of the fête champêtre, he hosted a succession of parties, often accompanied by the staging of operatic works. A week or so before his death he gave what would be his final party to celebrate the opening of his "shell grotto" with its suggestions of the underworld. He died of an AIDS-related illness.

The National Trust undertook the restoration of The Chinese House at Stowe in his memory.

He features as one of the portrait chapters in The Englishman's Room (1986) by Alvilde Lees-Milne, with photography by Derry Moore.

== Partial list of works ==
- Drayton House (Curwen Press, 1978)
- Britannia Illustrata by Knyff & Kip (Paradigm Press, 1984) co-edited with John Harris
- Writers at Home (Trefoil, 1985) "National Trust Studies" series editor
- The Treasure Houses of Britain: 500 Years of Private Patronage and Art Collecting (Yale University Press, 1985)
- The English Country House: A Grand Tour (Weidenfeld & Nicolson, 1985) co-authored with James Pipkin
- The Country House Garden: A Grand Tour (Pavilion, 1987) co-authored with James Pipkin
- Robert Adam and Kedleston: The Making of a Neo-Classical Masterpiece (The National Trust, 1987) with Leslie Harris
- The Fashioning and Functioning of the British Country House (National Gallery of Art, 1989) contributor
- The Country House in Perspective (Pavilion, 1990); US edition: The English Country House in Perspective (Grove Weidenfeld, 1990)
- John Nash: Views of the Royal Pavilion (Pavilion, 1991)
- An English Arcadia: 1600-1990 (The National Trust, 1992)
