= Forbes House, Ham =

Building in London, England

Coordinates: 51°26′03″N 0°18′35″W

Forbes House, Ham Common in the London Borough of Richmond upon Thames was built in 1996 for Sean O'Brien who founded Telstar Records. It replaced an earlier house built in 1936 which in turn had replaced the original Georgian House. It was once the home of Claude Bowes-Lyon, Lord Glamis.

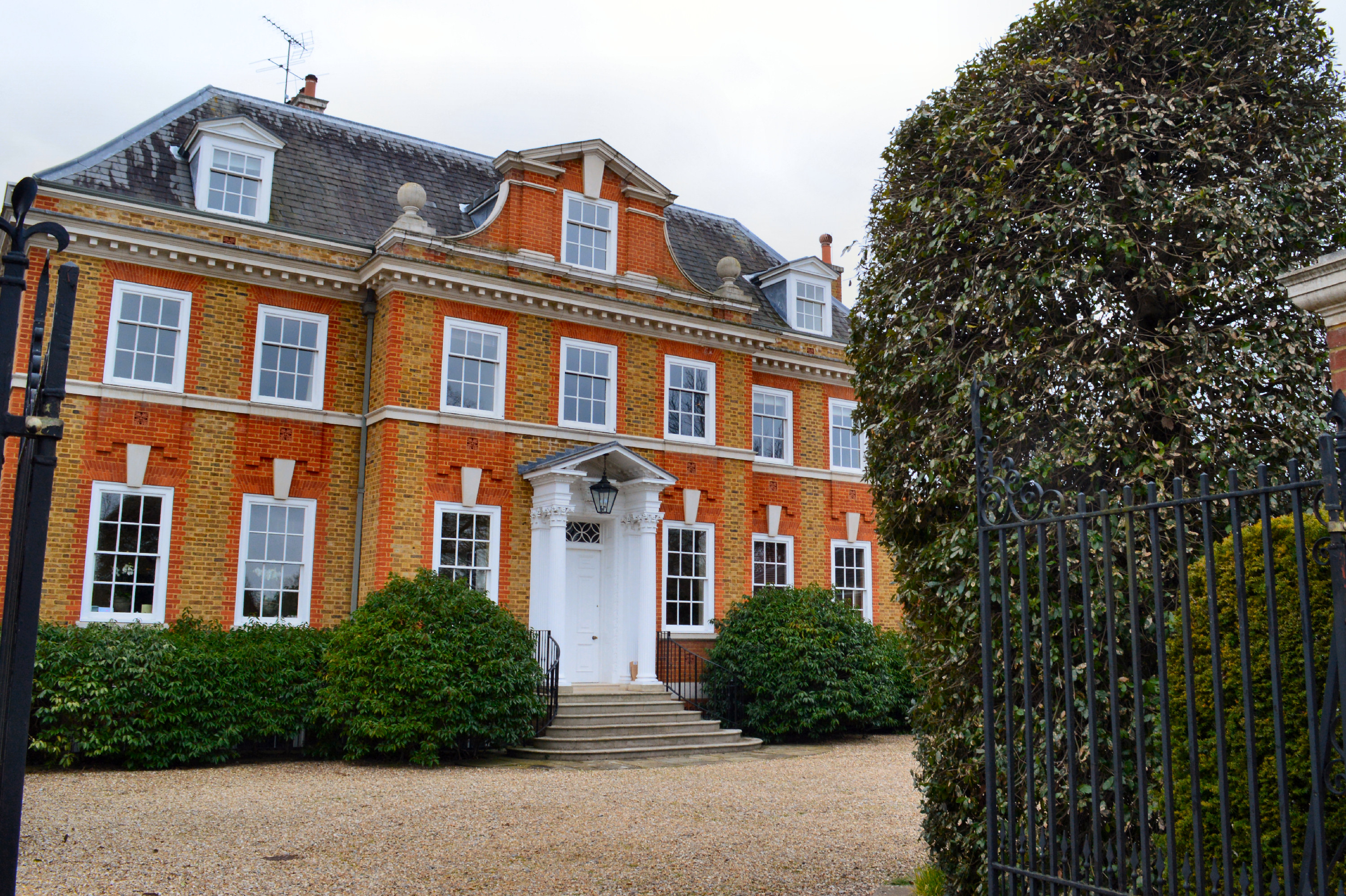
Forbes House

== Description ==
The present Forbes House overlooking Ham Common is a brick-built mansion in the Queen Anne style using two colours of brick, reconstituted stone, and wide timber window surrounds. It was designed by the architect Julian Bicknell. The front door case was carved by Dick Reid.

== History ==
=== The first house ===
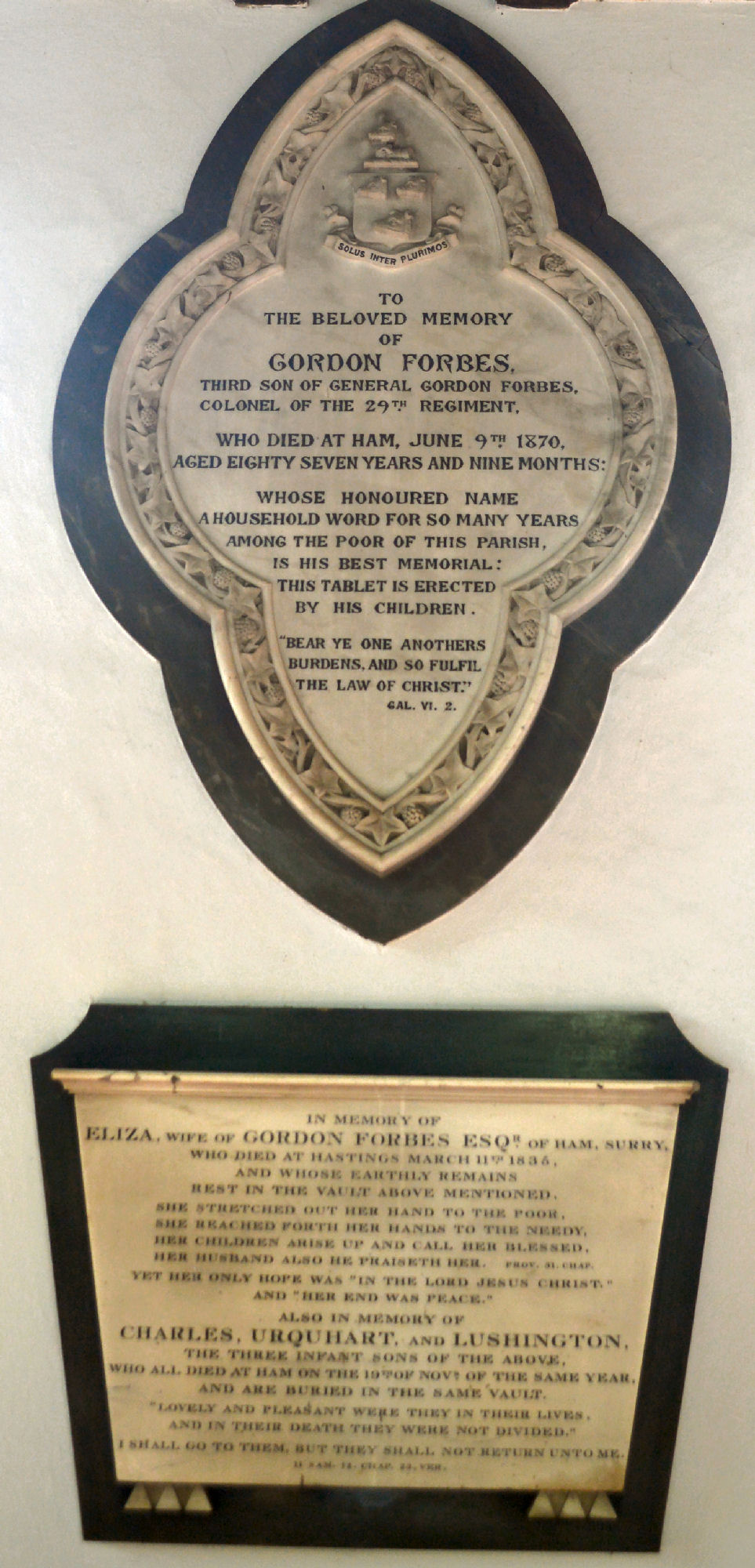
Memorial to Gordon Forbes in St Andrew's Church

In the 1770s much of the land round Ham Common was owned by Thomas Masson. He sold the Ham Common Estate in 1790 to Fountain North and it remained in the North family until 1862 when it was bought by Lady Meade. The house was occupied by Otto Bayer in 1780 and then by the Earl of Haddington, Earl of Edgcumbe, Viscount Torrington who died there 14 December 1812, and Sir Nathaniel Peacocke.

From 1828 the house was occupied by Colonel Gordon Elliot Forbes (1783–1870), the 3rd son of British Army general Gordon Forbes (1738–1828). His wife Eliza died in March 1836 and three of his youngest children died on the 19 November 1836 of measles. There is a memorial in St Andrew's church but they are buried in the family vault in St Peter's Church, Petersham. He died 9 June 1870.

In 1872 the house was bought by Harry Warren Scott (1833–1889) the son of Sir William Scott, 6th Baronet, of Ancrum, after his marriage in 1870. His wife Louisa Scott (1832–1918) had a daughter, Cecilia Nina (1862–1938), from her first marriage who in 1881 married Claude George Bowes-Lyon, Lord Glamis, at St Peter's Church, Petersham. They went on to have ten children. Their first child, Violet Hyacinth Bowes-Lyon (1882–1893), died of diphtheria at Forbes House; she is buried in St Andrew's churchyard. Their youngest daughter, Elizabeth Bowes-Lyon (1900–2002), the Queen Mother, used to come and stay with her grandmother at Forbes House.

Henry Warren Scott died on 23 August 1889 at Forbes House and is buried in St Andrew's church; his stepdaughters Violet Cavendish-Bentinck and Hyacinth Mary Jessup commissioned Sir Ninian Comper to create the memorial east window in St Andrew's church. Hyacinth died at Forbes House in 1916 and is buried at St Andrew's church. Eleanor Countess of Suffolk and Berkshire, the widow of Henry Howard, 18th Earl of Suffolk, died on 31 October 1928 at Forbes House. The house was then occupied by Caroline Muriel Baird (1861–1932), the widow of William Baird (1848–1918), who died there; she had her portrait painted as a child by George Frederic Watts.

=== The second house ===
Mrs Winifred Buckley purchased the Georgian House in 1935. It was demolished, to be replaced in 1936 with a new house designed by Oswald P. Milne in the Queen Anne style; she died in 1937. The house was then owned by Sir Francis Peek from 1938 until 1946.

Lady Grace Dance (1877–1960), the widow of Sir George Dance (1857–1932), lived here in the 1940s. George Dance, a dramatist and theatrical manager, was the owner and manager of Richmond Theatre from 1902. In St Andrew's church there is a memorial stained-glass window by Warren Wilson to George Dance and his son Eric who died in a prison camp during the Second World War. Lady Dance planned to sell the house in November 1949 to the Association of Engineering and Shipbuilding Draughtsmen to use as offices but the sale was refused by Surrey County Council who wanted it for an old people's home. The Council were offering less than the £26,000 that Lady Dance had paid for the house. In February 1950 Surrey Council's Town and County Planning Committee approved the plans of the County Welfare Committee to turn Forbes House into a home for the aged. In 1958 Craig House was built in the grounds facing Craig Road. The Friends of Forbes House and Craig House held an annual garden party. The house was used as an old people's home until this closed in 1992.

The house appeared in the film Up the Junction (1968) as the Chelsea home of Polly (Suzy Kendall).

=== The third house ===
The 1936 house was then bought by John Beckwith who demolished it in October 1992 before selling the site. A new house, designed in the Queen Anne style by Julian Bicknell for Sean O'Brien who founded Telstar Records, was completed in 1996.
