= Felix Kelly =

New Zealand artist

- Felix Kelly
- Born: 3 February 1914; Mountain Road, Epsom, Auckland, New Zealand
- Died: 3 July 1994 (aged 80); Devon, England
- Other name: Fix
- Occupations: Designer and illustrator

Felix Runcie Kelly (3 February 1914 – 3 July 1994) was a New Zealand-born graphic designer, painter, stage designer, interior designer and illustrator who lived the majority of his life in the United Kingdom. He sometimes signed his illustration and cartoon work Fix.

== Early life ==
Born in Auckland, New Zealand, Kelly was the second son of Felix Vincent Kelly, a prosperous engineer, and his much younger wife, Hortense Agnes Kelly née Runcie. Kelly attended King's College but was mostly home-schooled in his younger years. He trained as a graphic artist and designer and also sold the occasional cartoon. His father went bankrupt in 1933 and his mother left him to live in England. Kelly left New Zealand in 1935 and joined his mother in London. He never returned to New Zealand.

In London Kelly was soon employed as a graphic designer at Lintas, the advertising wing of Unilever. At the outbreak of the Second World War he enlisted in the Royal Air Force where he became a navigating officer. In 1943 he suffered a severe illness that ended his active service and resulted in Kelly focusing on his painting.

== Artistic career ==
Kelly's paintings were influenced by the Surrealists. His specialisation in domestic architecture and regular commissions saw him develop a romantic style that found more favour with his clientele and often included a number of recurring motifs such as red and white striped deckchairs, and items of mechanical engineering such as hot air balloons, paddle steamers, railways, trains, trams, and lighting fixtures. His paintings were meticulously executed. Houses were painted to an architecturally accurate standard but often contrasted with an untamed, almost sinister landscape.

Kelly's first one-man show was in 1943 at the Lefevre Gallery. This was a success. Herbert Read, the writer and art critic, bought a painting and invited Kelly to illustrate the second edition of his short novel, The Green Child. Kelly accepted the commission. Read returned the favour by writing the introduction to the book Paintings by Felix Kelly published in 1946 by Falcon Press. In 1944 a larger exhibition of Kelly's works opened at the same gallery with works by Lucian Freud and Julian Trevelyan in adjoining rooms.

Kelly accepted numerous commissions for paintings, murals and for illustration work. His commissions led him to visit and stay at many of the grandest country houses in the United Kingdom. His personality, wit, and charm ensured he was often invited back by his wealthy clients and, in some cases, developed into lifelong friendships. In 1947 he was invited to the United States by the New York gallery Portraits, Inc. Condé Nast Publications commissioned him to paint a number of important American houses and the publication of these works led to more commissions in the United States. The same year he also illustrated for the Lilliput magazine. He fulfilled commissions in the UK, United States, Russia, North Africa, the Far East, and the Caribbean. In addition to painting he was often in demand as a muralist and interior designer. His own apartment was photographed and featured in magazines a number of times. He completed a mural for the banqueting hall of the Royal Palace, Kathmundu, Nepal, murals in a number of Union Castle and Cunard liners, but probably his most well known commission was the four murals painted in the Garden Hall at Castle Howard in 1982. These murals were commissioned by George Howard and paid for with the location fee from the Brideshead Revisited television production. Kelly also designed the Kelly car at Castle Howard, a little fairground-style train for conveying visitors round the grounds. Kelly also worked on developing architectural ideas for his clientele. He produced an artist's impression of a Palladian temple for Sebastian de Ferranti, who then worked with various architects to realise the design. de Ferranti chose Julian Bicknell to build the house which was completed in 1986 Later Kelly worked on the Cave, a modern grotto, at Henbury Hall. Kelly remodelled the house of Sir Michael Blake at Cornhill-on-Tweed and designed it as a Gothic dowerhouse. On the request of Charles, Prince of Wales Kelly produced an artist's impression of an improved design of the Prince of Wales' residence Highgrove House in Gloucestershire. This became the inspiration of the remodelling of Highgrove.

Kelly also produced set designs for a number of theatre productions including:

- Production: A Day by the Sea, 1953, the Haymarket. This production starred Sybil Thorndike and John Gielgud
- Production: World premier of the Opera Nelson, 1954, Sadler's Wells Theatre
- Production: The Merchant of Venice, 1960–61, the Old Vic
- Production: The Last Joke, 1960, the Phoenix

Kelly illustrated a number of books including a very successful collaboration his friend Elizabeth Burton whose four-volume series on the domestic interiors and furnishings of Elizabethans, Jacobeans, Georgians and early Victorians ideally fit Kelly's aesthetic. His tendency towards the surreal and sinister was reflected in the dust jacket work he did for Faber and Faber's Best of series including Best Horror Stories (1957), Best Detective Stories (1959), and Best Tales of Terror (1962), as well as a beautiful wrap-around dust jacket - plus all internal illustrations - for Haunted Houses (1956) by Joseph Braddock. He also illustrated

- Twilight Stories (1947) by Rhoda Broughton
- A Strange Adventure in the Life of Miss Laura Mildmay (1947) by J Sheridan Le Fanu
- The Desperate Art: a novel (1955) by John Rosenberg
- Pilgrim's pleasure: the West Country (1959) by Alan Ivimey
- London (1960) by Ivor Brown
- Castle Howard (1972) by George Howard
- Lincolnshire churches: Their past and their future edited by Henry Thorold

== Death ==
Kelly was diagnosed with Alzheimer's disease in 1992 and died in Devon in 1994. His partner, the garden designer Vernon Russell-Smith inherited his estate.

== Work in Public collections ==
- Kelly's archive of sketches, photographs and papers is held by the Museum of New Zealand Te Papa Tongarewa, who also own 2 paintings
- The RW Norton Art Foundation owns 23 paintings
- Hawke's Bay Museum and Art Gallery owns 8 paintings
- Various British public institutions own 7 paintings
- A second Kelly archive that consists of the research papers of Kelly academic, Dr Donald Bassett, as well as original Kelly material is available at the E H McCormick Research Library, Auckland Art Gallery Toi o Tāmaki https://www.aucklandartgallery.com/explore-art-and-ideas/archives/35295
