= Britannia Illustrata =

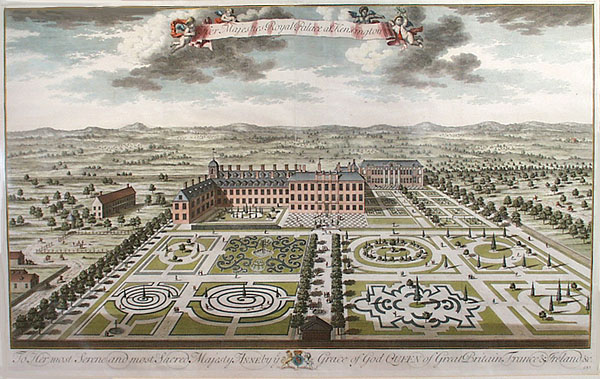
Depiction of Kensington Palace

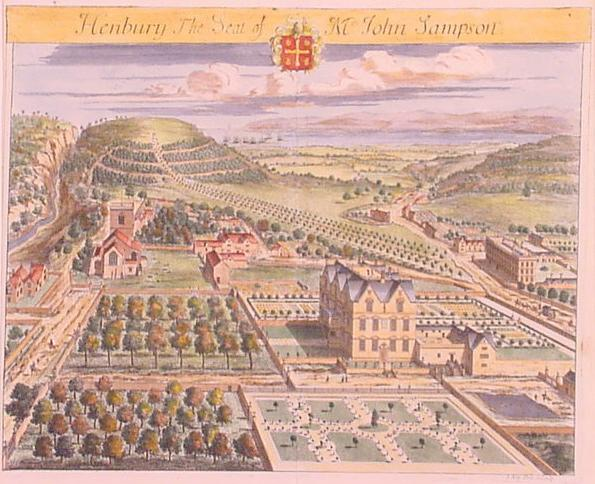
Depiction of Henbury Hall

Britannia Illustrata, also known as Views of Several of the Queens Palaces and also of the Principal Seats of the Nobility & Gentry of Great Britain, is a 1707–09 map plate folio of parts of Great Britain. It was produced by the Dutch draughtsman Jan Kip in collaboration with Leonard Knijff, and printed in London for publishers including David Mortier, Daniel Midwinter, Henry Overton, and Joseph Smith.

The folio consisted of a range of large, detailed folded colored and black and white drawings which today provides a valuable insight into land and buildings at country estates at the time.

The volume is among the most important English topographical publications of the 18th century. Architecture is rendered with care, and the settings of parterres and radiating avenues driven through woods or planted across fields, garden paths gates and toolsheds are illustrated in detail, and staffed with figures and horses, coaches pulling into forecourts, water-craft on rivers, in line with the traditions of the Low Countries. Some of the plates are in the Siennese "map perspective". At Althorp in Northamptonshire, the map revealed in detail the changes to the gardens by André Le Nôtre from earlier maps and depictions. Kip updated the plates in the 1720s.
