= Julian Bicknell =

English architect (born 1945)

- Born: 23 February 1945 (age 81); Cambridge, England
- Education: Winchester College
- Alma mater: King's College, Cambridge
- Occupation: Architect
- Years active: 1966–present
- Employer(s): Royal College of Art; Arup Associates
- Website: www.julianbicknell.co.uk

Julian Bicknell, MA, DipArch, RIBA, FRSA, AWG (born 23 February 1945), is a British architect.

== Early life ==
Julian Bicknell was born in Cambridge, England, on 23 February 1945, while his father Wing Commander Nigel Bicknell DSO DFC was in hospital at RAF Wroughton after a serious crash. Bicknell was educated at Mowden Hall School, Stocksfield, Northumberland, and Winchester College, before studying architecture at King's College, Cambridge (MA, 1967).

== Career ==
Bicknell started off working with Edward Cullinan in London (1966–72). He joined the teaching staff at the Royal College of Art under Sir Hugh Casson in 1972, becoming director of the Royal College of Art Project Office (1973–79). In 1979, he joined Arup Associates (reconstruction of Bedford School) under Sir Philip Dowson. He set up Julian Bicknell & Associates in 1983.

Bicknell's background is in modification, alteration, and restoration of existing buildings, but his practice has been most involved in the design and construction of new buildings in which the lessons of history are combined with contemporary architectural thinking and technology. His work in the UK includes The Old Gaol, Abingdon (RIBA Award 1976), new interiors at Castle Howard (Carpenters' Award 1984), projects for Oxford and Cambridge Colleges, the reconstruction of the Hunterian Museum for the Royal College of Surgeons of England, and other projects involving sensitivity to complex historical contexts. Private houses make up the bulk of Bicknell's work, including Henbury Hall, Cheshire, Upton Parva, Warwickshire, Carden Hall, Cheshire, Forbes House, Ham, Forest of Bere, Hampshire, Royal Crest House, Takasaki, Princess Square, Esher, and the unusual oval house at Arragon Mooar, Isle of Man.

In 1983, Bicknell's firm won the competition for a new residence for HM Ambassador in Moscow, although the contract was never awarded. In the 1990s, he designed and built a number of English-style buildings for the leisure sector in Japan: restaurants, a golf club, banqueting facilities, and a complete, historically authentic, Shakespearean village.

Despite a growing number of building projects, Bicknell continues to teach in Britain and abroad. He was much involved in the development of the Prince of Wales Institute of Architecture between 1990 and 2000, on the Academic Board and as a teacher at the Institute itself and also at the ground-breaking international summer schools in Italy, Germany, France, and the UK. He has also taught and lectured in the US, Russia, and Japan.

== Associations ==
Bicknell is a Fellow of the Royal Society of Arts, a member of the College of Practitioners of INTBAU, and of the Traditional Architecture Group. He is a member of the Art Workers Guild and was its Master in 2013.

== Papers and exhibitions ==
- The Design for Need Exhibition, ICSID Conference, Dublin, 1978.
- An affair of values, Rehabilitation and Conversion Conference, Glasgow, 1978.
- Recent Work by Arup Associates, New Uses for Old Buildings Conference, Manchester, 1983.
- Palladio in England: a new Rotonda, Gritti Lectures, Venice, 1987.
- Vision of Britain Exhibition, Victoria & Albert Museum, London, 1990.
- Formula Function and Fantasy, Building America Conference, Alexandria, Virginia, USA, 1992.
- Vision of Europe Exhibition, Bologna, 1994.
- Julian Bicknell & Associates, Exhibition at The Prince of Wales Institute of Architecture, 1996.

== Publications ==
- The Design for Need Papers; Pergamon, Oxford, 1978 (joint Editor with Liz McQuiston)
- Rehabilitation and Conversion; Newnes-Butterworth, London, 1980 (Contributor)
- Building Classical; Academy Editions, London, 1993 (Contributor)
- Hiroshige in Tokyo; Pomegranate, San Francisco, 1994
- Great Buildings of the World; Potter, New York, 1995 (with Steve Chapman)
- Julian Bicknell – Designs and Buildings 1980–2000; Julian Bicknell & Associates, London, 2000
