= Richard Armiger =

Architechural Model Maker

Richard Armiger is a professional, international architectural model maker and the founder of Network Modelmakers. He is one of the foremost authorities on the design, research, construction and restoration of historic, culturally important architectural models. Armiger’s models, for architecture and design firms, including David Chipperfield, Grimshaw Architects, Zaha Hadid, John McAslan, John Pawson, and the late Jan Kaplický have appeared frequently in architectural exhibitions worldwide.

Examples of his work can be seen in museums in the UK and internationally, including the permanent collection at the Victoria and Albert Museum and regularly at the Venice Biennale of Architecture. During a career spanning four decades, thirty-five of his models have been selected for display in the annual Royal Academy of Arts Summer Exhibition. In 2014 he was chosen to make a timber model for Westminster Abbey of the proposed new Queen’s Diamond Jubilee Galleries.

== Education and Career ==
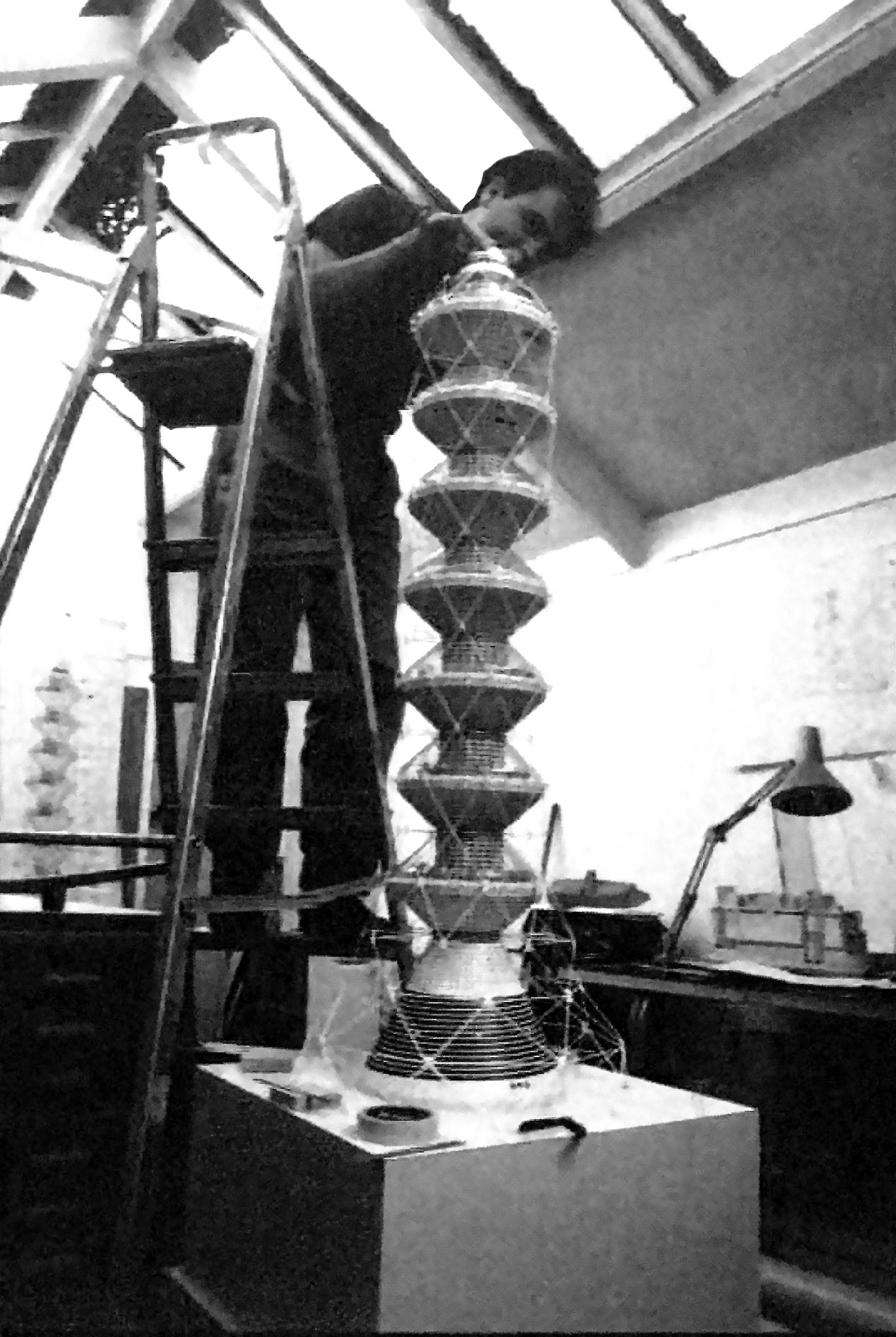
Richard Armiger working in his Kings Cross studio in 1984 on the model for the Coexistence Tower designed by Jan Kaplický of Future Systems.

Armiger first attended the Maryland Institute College of Art (MICA) in 1970, studying painting and sculpture, before later studying industrial-design model making in England at the Kent Institute of Art & Design (KIAD) under inspirational Arup modelmaker George Rome Innes, graduating in 1978. He then spent time working at Arup Group before setting up the in-house model shop for Festival of Britain chief architect Sir Hugh Casson of Casson Conder Partnership, and then establishing his own independent workshop, Network Modelmakers in 1983. During this period he was also mentored by the Boston, USA designers at Cambridge Seven Associates.

In the 1980s Armiger created many models for the London-based design studio Future Systems, led by architect Jan Kaplický and David Nixon. Many of these models, including the 3m high model for the Coexistence Tower, are now in the possession of the Kaplicky Center in Prague and are regularly on public display, including at the May 2025 Pulse festival in Ostrava, Czech Republic.

Armiger was commissioned in 1999 to build a 1/100 scale model of the proposed Eden Project in Cornwall by Grimshaw Architects. This was a challenging model given the complex geodesic design and Armiger describes the model's construction in detail in the book Architectural Modelmaking (Portfolio Skills. Architecture) by Nick Dunn. The model was displayed in the RIBA’s “Difficult Sites: Architecture Against the Odds" exhibition in London in 2024-2025.

As consultant Model Coordinator to Crossrail (now 'The Elizabeth Line'), in 2002 Armiger helped clarify the project's complexity to the Parliamentary Select committee and other design laymen in addition to designing and overseeing the building of the many models.

In 2006, Armiger and his team created a lit model measuring four meters square that became the winning entry for Singapore's Gardens by the Bay competition after an exhibition to display the model to the public. The competition was won jointly by Grant Associates landscape designers and Wilkinson Eyre architects.

Many of his models have been shown in international architectural design competitions including several winning designs by Architects Nicholas Grimshaw. These include the Caixa Art Gallery, A Coruña, Spain; National Space Centre, Leicester, England; Southern Cross station, Melbourne, Australia; Enneus Heerma Bridge, Amsterdam, Netherlands; Frankfurt Exhibition Hall, Germany; and Donald Danforth Plant Science Center, Missouri, USA.

He is also the Director of House Portrait Models, a brand established in 1998 within the studio to market handcrafted ‘model portraits’ of private homes and estates.

Armiger has long been a proponent for the recognition of the artistic, creative and inspirational role and general contribution of the architectural model maker to the design process.

== Notable Models ==
=== Westminster Abbey (2014), Buckingham Palace ===
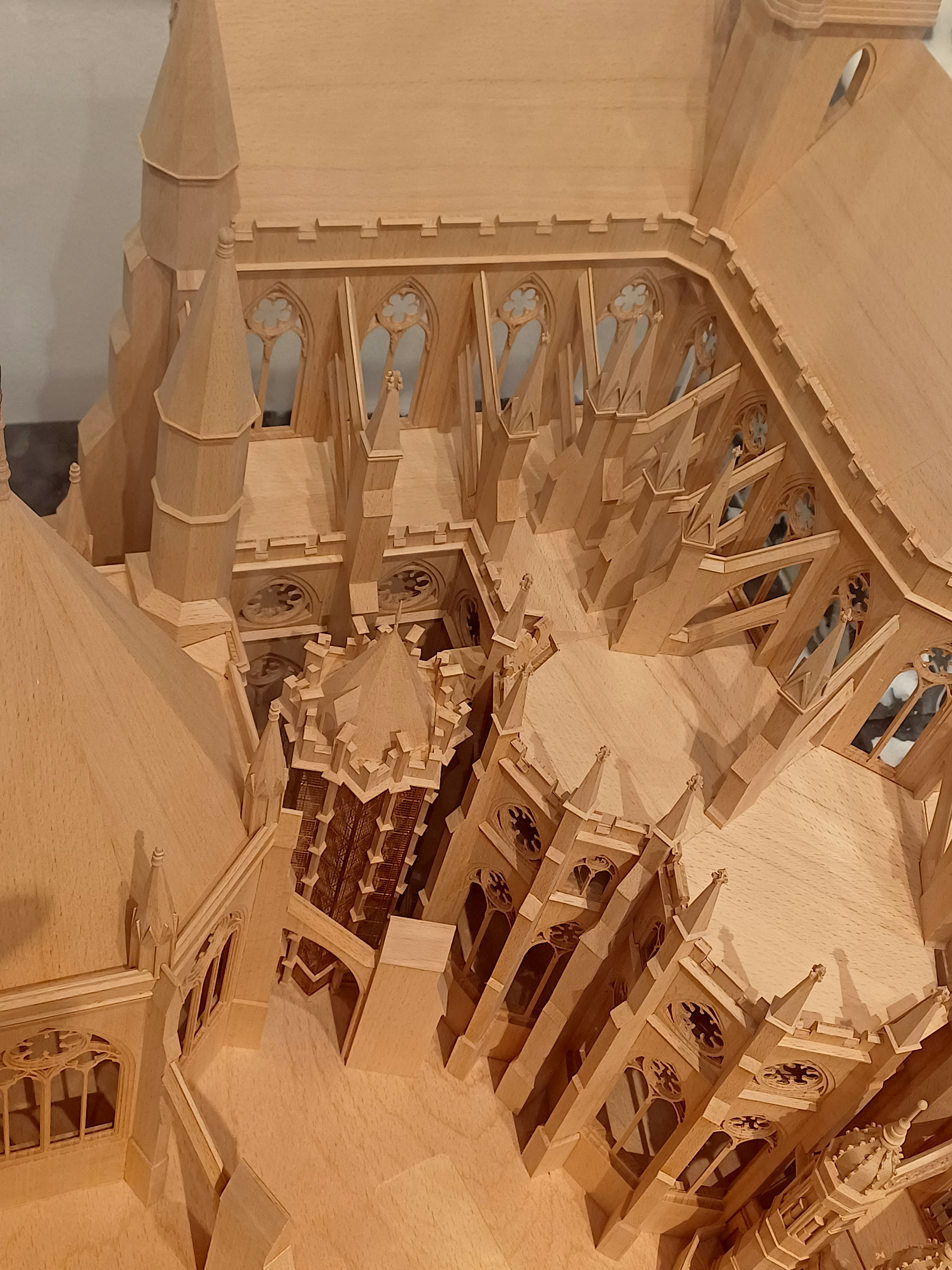
Timber model of Westminster Abbey. The model was presented to the Queen by Richard Armiger in June 2014.

The timber model of Westminster Abbey, one of Armiger’s largest and most ambitious models, was designed and built in collaboration with Simon Hamnell of Millennium Models and George Rome Innes. The model was commissioned to assist with the planning process for The Weston Tower which gives access to The Queen’s Diamond Jubilee Galleries, which opened in 2018. Armiger presented the Abbey model at Buckingham Palace in June 2014. In 2018 the model was displayed in the Royal Academy's 250th Summer exhibition as a work of art, and again in 2024-25 at the RIBA “Difficult Sites: Architecture Against the Odds" exhibition in London.

Le Corbusier - Villa Stein De Monzie (1987), Victoria & Albert Museum

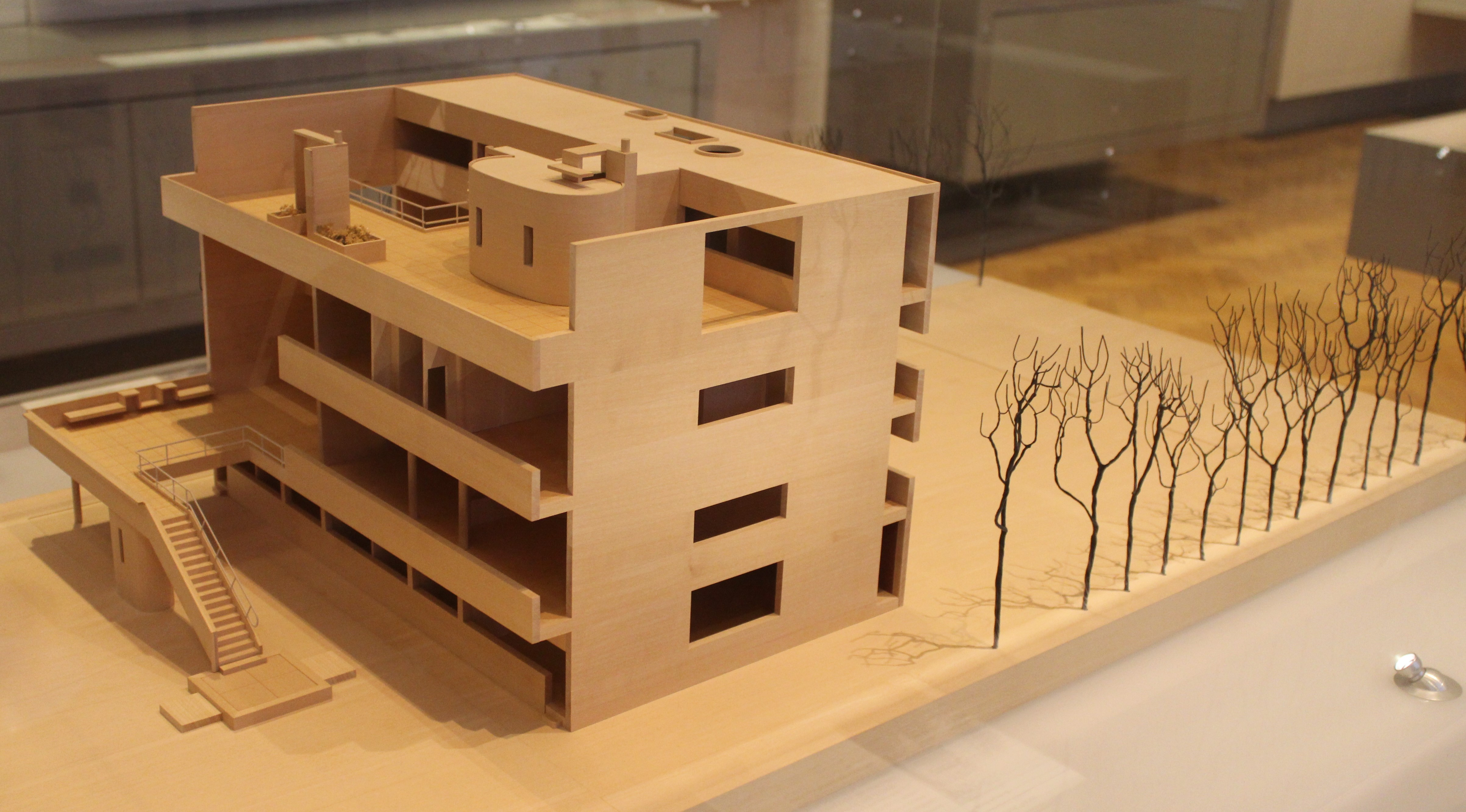
Model of Villa Stein-de-Monzie, Garches, France built in 1926-28 by Le Corbusier. Sycamore timber model made in 1987 by Richard Armiger/Network Modelmakers. Victoria and Albert Museum, London.

The Crystal Palace (2001), Victoria & Albert Museum

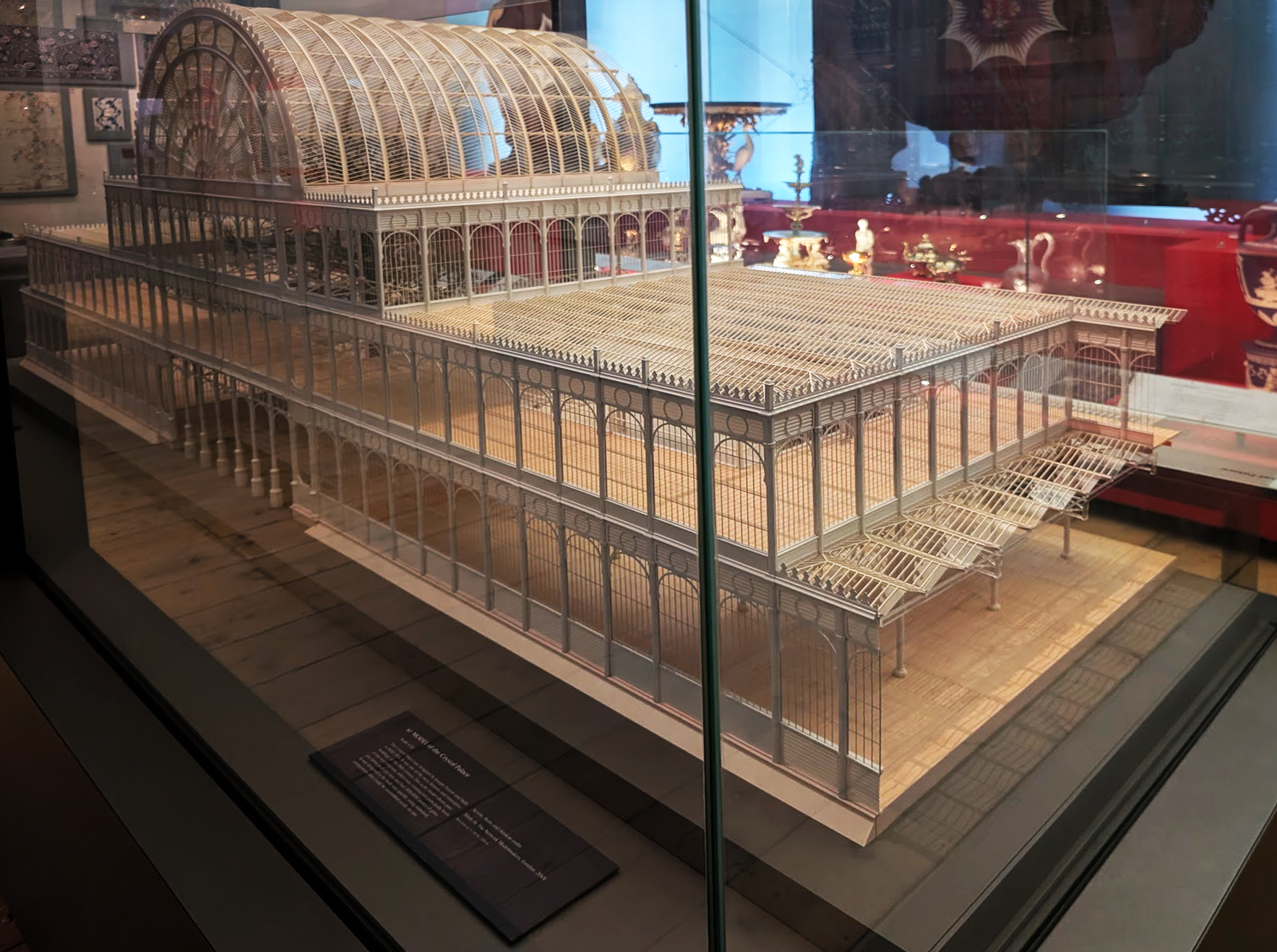
Model of The Crystal Palace at 1:32 scale, made by Richard Armiger and produced by the Network Modelmakers for the British Galleries at the Victoria and Albert Museum, London 2001.

Le Corbusier - Governor's Palace at Chandigarh (1951), Victoria & Albert Museum

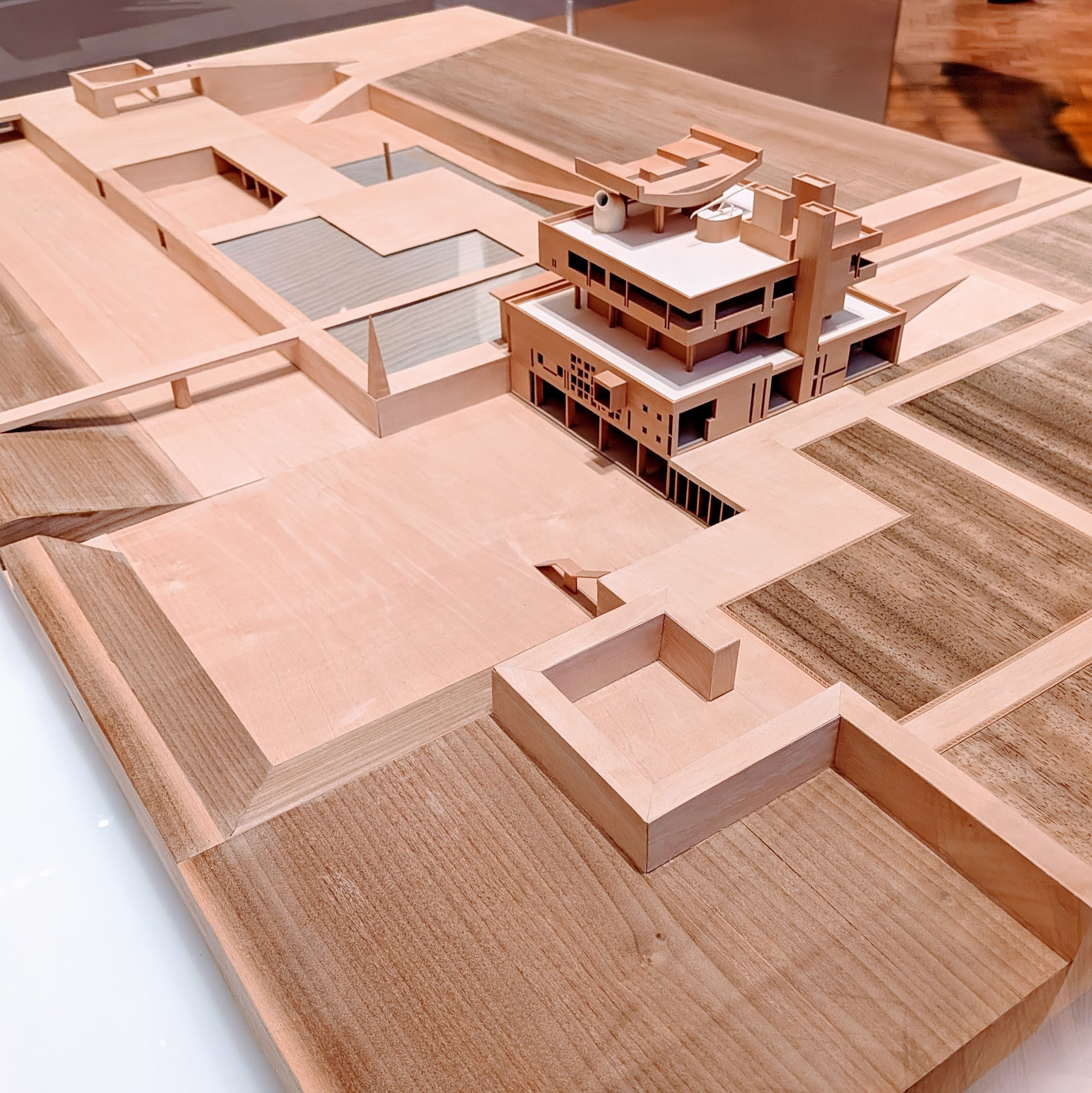
Timber model (1:400 scale) of Le Corbusier's unbuilt 1951 proposal for the Governor's Palace at Chandigarh, India, at the V&A Architecture Gallery. Handmade at Network Modelmakers by Andy Jackson with Edward Cullinan Architects staff in 1986-7.
