= List of works by Francis Goodwin =

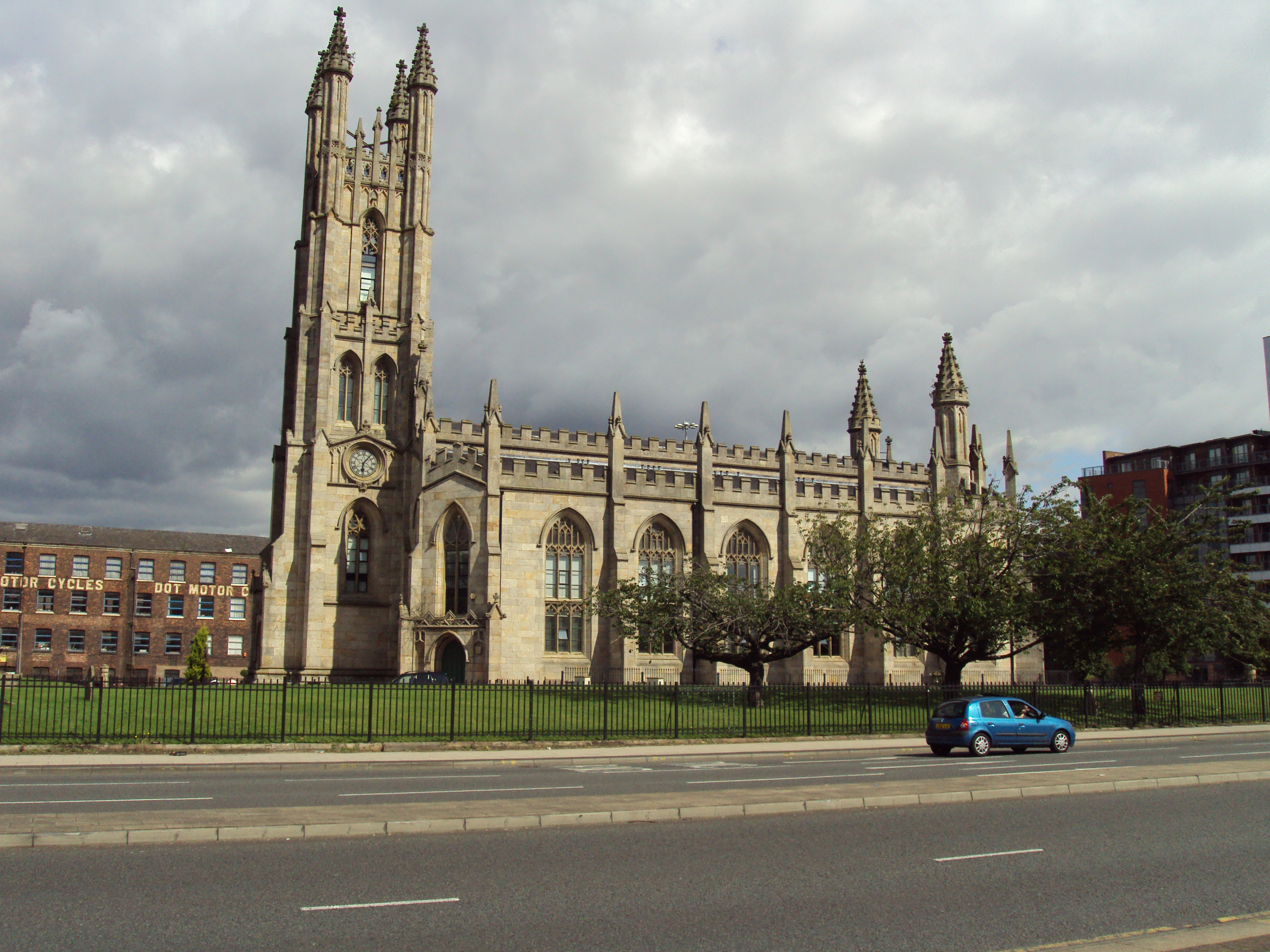
St George's Church, Manchester

Francis Goodwin (1784–1835) was an English architect, born in King's Lynn, Norfolk. He trained under J. Coxedge in Kensington, London. He initially designed two churches in King's Lynn, followed by nine Commissioners' churches. He then designed more new churches, and rebuilt or remodelled other churches, for different clients, and also gained commissions for civic and public buildings. Most of his church designs were in Gothic Revival style, while those for civic and public buildings were mainly Neoclassical. Later in his career he became involved in domestic architecture. He also unsuccessfully created many designs for other buildings, such as King's College, Cambridge, and the new Houses of Parliament. He died suddenly in London, and was buried in Kensal Green Cemetery.

== Key ==
Grade	Criteria
Grade I	Buildings of exceptional interest, sometimes considered to be internationally important.
Grade II*	Particularly important buildings of more than special interest.
Grade II	Buildings of national importance and special interest.
"—" denotes a work that is not graded.

== Works ==
Name	Location	Photograph	Date	Notes	Grade
Trinity Chapel, St Margaret's Church	King's Lynn, Norfolk; 52.7516°N 0.3954°E		1809	Rebuilt the chapel.	I
St Faith's Church	Gaywood, Norfolk; 52.7564°N 0.4231°E		1809	Restored the church, adding a plaster groin vault.	II*
Manchester Town Hall	Manchester		1819–34	Demolished. Part of its colonnade (pictured) is in Heaton Park.	II*
St Matthew's Church	Walsall, West Midlands; 52.5824°N 1.9773°W		1820–21	Partly rebuilt an earlier church.	II*
St Paul's Church	Southsea, Hampshire		1820–22	Gothic Revival with four turrets. Bombed about 1941; demolished.	
Holy Trinity Church, Bordesley	Bordesley, West Midlands; 52.4705°N 1.8775°W		1820–22	Gothic Revival with two west turrets. Redundant since 1971.	II
St Peter's Church	Ashton-under-Lyne, Greater Manchester; 53.4840°N 2.1058°W		1821–24	Gothic Revival with a west tower and pinnacles.	II*
St George's Church	Kidderminster, Worcestershire; 52.3903°N 2.2424°W		1821–24	Commissioners' church, Gothic Revival.	II*
Christ Church	West Bromwich, West Midlands		1821–29	Commissioners' church, restored because of subsidence 1858 and 1876. Since demolished.	
St Paul's Church	Birmingham, West Midlands; 52.4853°N 1.9058°W		1822–23	Spire added.	I
Macclesfield Town Hall	Macclesfield, Cheshire; 53.2606°N 2.1252°W		1823–24	Greek Revival.	II*
Holy Trinity Church	Burton upon Trent, Staffordshire		1824	Damaged by fire in 1879, and replaced by another church in 1882.	
Leeds Central Market	Leeds, West Yorkshire		1824–27	Burnt down 1893.	
Salford Market	Salford, Greater Manchester		1825		
Old Parsonage	Bilston, West Midlands; 52.5667°N 2.0750°W		c. 1825		II
St Leonard's Church	Bilston, West Midlands; 52.5665°N 2.0753°W		1825–26	Neoclassical	II
St Paul's Church	Walsall, West Midlands; 52.5853°N 1.9818°W		1826	Chancel added in 1852; replaced in 1892–93.	
St George's Church	Manchester; 53.4721°N 2.2593°W		1826–28	Commissioners' church, Neoclassical; now redundant and converted into flats.	II*
St James' Church	Oldham, Greater Manchester; 53.5458°N 2.0954°W		1827–28	Commissioners' church, Neoclassical.	II
St Mary's Church	Bilston, West Midlands; 52.5639°N 2.0680°W		1827–29	Commissioners' church, Gothic Revival.	II*
St John the Evangelist's Church	Derby; 52.9258°N 1.4879°W		1828	Gothic Revival.	II*
St. Michael's Church	Southampton, Hampshire; 50.8996°N 1.4052°W		1828–29	Added galleries.	I
Meynell Langley House	Kirk Langley, Derbyshire; 52.9547°N 1.5543°W		1829	Added a new front to the country house.	II
St Thomas' Church	Pendleton, Salford, Greater Manchester; 53.4921°N 2.2857°W		1829–31	With Richard Lane; Commissioners' church, Gothic Revival.Restored 1887.	II
Old Gaol	Derby; 52.9235°N 1.4913°W		c. 1830	The façade remains.	II
Gatehouse, Markree Castle	County Sligo, Ireland		1832	With lodge and castellated tower.	
Lodge, Teddesley Hall	Near Penkridge, Staffordshire		1835	A lodge to the now-demolished hall.	
Lissadell House	County Sligo, Ireland; 54.3467°N 8.5808°W		1836 (completed)	Built for Sir Robert Gore-Booth.	
