= List of Commissioners' churches in Northeast and Northwest England =

A Commissioners' church is an Anglican church in the United Kingdom built with money voted by Parliament as a result of the Church Building Act 1818, and subsequent related Acts. Such churches have been given a number of titles, including "Commissioners' Churches", "Waterloo Churches" and "Million Act Churches". In some cases the Commissioners provided the full cost of the new church; in other cases they provided a grant and the balance was raised locally. This list contains the Commissioners' churches in North East England and North West England

== Key ==
| Grade | Criteria |
|---|---|
| I | Buildings of exceptional interest, sometimes considered to be internationally important. |
| II* | Particularly important buildings of more than special interest. |
| II | Buildings of national importance and special interest. |
"—" denotes a work that is not graded.

== Churches ==
| Name and location | Photograph | Date | Grant in £ | Architect | Notes and refs. | Grade |
|---|---|---|---|---|---|---|
| St Peter, Blackburn, Lancashire | — | 1819–22 | 8,000 | John Palmer | Gothic Revival with a tower. Was listed in 1974, but closed and was demolished in 1976. | — |
| St Peter, Ashton-under-Lyne, Greater Manchester; 53.4840°N 2.1058°W | | 1821–24 | 13,191 | Francis Goodwin | Gothic Revival with a west tower and pinnacles. | II |
| St George, Tyldesley, Greater Manchester; 53.5135°N 2.4714°W | | 1821–24 | 9,706 | Sir Robert Smirke | Gothic Revival with a tower and steeple. Chancel added 1886. | II |
| Holy Trinity, Hoghton, Chorley, Lancashire; 53.7281°N 2.5851°W | | 1822–23 | 2,037 | Robert Roper | Gothic Revival with four turrets. Rebuilt 1891. | II |
| St John, Workington, Cumbria; 54.6417°N 3.5443°W | — | 1822–23 | 10,488 | Thomas Hardwick | Neoclassical Tuscan with porch and wooden cupola. Tower added in 1847 and chancel in 1881. | II* |
| St Peter, Preston, Lancashire; 53.7636°N 2.7082°W | | 1822–24 | 6,765 | Thomas Rickman and Henry Hutchinson | Gothic Revival with a bell gable and clerestory. East tower with spire added 1851. Now part of the University of Central Lancashire. | II* |
| St Philip, Salford, Greater Manchester; 53.4840°N 2.2631°W | | 1822–24 | 16,804 | Sir Robert Smirke | Neoclassical Ionic with south porch and tower. | II* |
| All Saints, Stand, Whitefield, Greater Manchester; 53.5505°N 2.2981°W | | 1822–25 | 13,812 | Sir Charles Barry | Gothic Revival with a tower and arcade. | I |
| St George, Chorley, Lancashire; 53.6521°N 2.6292°W | | 1822–25 | 12,387 | Thomas Rickman | Gothic Revival with a tower. Chancel added 1891. | II* |
| St Matthew, Campfield, Manchester | — | 1822–25 | 16,733 | Sir Charles Barry | Gothic Revival with a tower, spire and arcade. Demolished 1951. | — |
| St Paul, Preston, Lancashire; 53.7624°N 2.6941°W | — | 1822–25 | 6,221 | Thomas Rickman and Henry Hutchinson | Gothic Revival with corner turrets. Chancel added 1882. Now a radio studio. | II |
| St Thomas, Stockport, Greater Manchester; 53.4035°N 2.1550°W | | 1822–25 | 15,636 | George Basevi | Neoclassical Ionic with east porch and west tower. Chancel added in 1890. | I |
| Holy Trinity, Bolton, Greater Manchester; 53.5739°N 2.4268°W | | 1823–25 | 13,924 | Philip Hardwick | Gothic Revival with a tower. Now redundant. | II |
| St Mary, West Rainton, County Durham; 54.8158°N 1.4991°W | — | 1824 | 550 | John Anderson | Gothic Revival with a belfry. Rebuilt and replaced 1864. | — |
| St John, Gateshead Fell, Gateshead, Tyne and Wear; 54.9383°N 1.5885°W | | 1824–25 | 1,000 | John Ions | Gothic Revival style. Restored 1885. | II |
| St John the Evangelist, Farnworth, Greater Manchester; 53.5485°N 2.3879°W | | 1824–26 | 6,704 | Thomas Hardwick | Gothic Revival with a tower. Chancel added 1871. | II |
| St Martin in the Fields, Liverpool, Merseyside; 53.4212°N 2.9845°W | — | 1825–28 | 19,948 | John Foster, junior | Gothic Revival with a tower and spire. Damaged by bombing, closed 1946; demolished c.1952–54. | — |
| St Matthew's Church, Stretton, Warrington, Cheshire; 53.3404°N 2.5717°W | | 1826–27 | 2,121 | Philip Hardwick | Gothic Revival with a tower. Replaced. | II |
| St George, Chester Road, Manchester; 53.4721°N 2.2592°W | | 1826–28 | 15,025 | Francis Goodwin | Gothic Revival with a tower. Converted into flats 2000. | II* |
| St Mary, Birch, Greater Manchester | — | 1827–28 | 3,881 | Clark Rampling | Gothic Revival style. Demolished. | — |
| St James, Lower Darwen, Lancashire; 53.7237°N 2.4652°W | — | 1827–28 | 5,501 | Thomas Rickman and Henry Hutchinson | Gothic Revival with a tower. Rebuilt and replaced 1969. | — |
| St James, Oldham, Greater Manchester; 53.5458°N 2.0954°W | | 1827–28 | 9,652 | Francis Goodwin | Gothic Revival with a turret on a low tower. | II |
| St Patrick, Winlaton, Tyne and Wear | — | 1827–28 | 1,531 | Ignatius Bonomi | Gothic Revival with a tower. Chancel added later. | — |
| St Thomas, Bishopwearmouth, Sunderland, Tyne and Wear | — | 1827–29 | 4,570 | Philip William Wyatt | Gothic Revival style. Damaged by bombing and demolished. | — |
| Holy Trinity, Darwen, Lancashire; 53.6955°N 2.4645°W | | 1827–29 | 6,799 | Thomas Rickman and Henry Hutchinson | Gothic Revival with a tower. Now dedicated to St Peter. | II* |
| St Mary, Mellor, Lancashire; 53.7729°N 2.5308°W | | 1827–29 | 5,534 | Thomas Rickman and Henry Hutchinson | Gothic Revival with a tower and spire. Chancel enlarged 1897. | II |
| Christ Church, Carlisle, Cumbria | — | 1828–30 | 9,697 shared | Thomas Rickman and Henry Hutchinson | Gothic Revival with a tower. Damaged by fire in 1938, demolished 1952. | — |
| Holy Trinity, Carlisle, Cumbria; 54.8920°N 2.9520°W | — | 1828–30 | 9,697 shared | Thomas Rickman and Henry Hutchinson | Gothic Revival with a tower. Demolished 1981. | — |
| St Paul, Warrington, Cheshire | — | 1829–30 | 4,239 | Edward Blore | Gothic Revival with a tower. Demolished. | — |
| St John, Burscough, Lancashire; 53.6045°N 2.8403°W | | 1829–31 | 3,040 | Daniel Stewart | Gothic Revival with a belfry. | II* |
| St Andrew, Travis Street, Manchester | — | 1829–31 | 10,591 | Peter Atkinson and Richard Sharp | Gothic Revival with a tower and clerestory. Demolished. | — |
| St Thomas, Pendleton, Salford, Greater Manchester; 53.4921°N 2.2857°W | | 1829–31 | 6,673 | Francis Goodwin and Richard Lane | Gothic Revival with a tower. Restored 1887. | II |
| Holy Trinity, Ulverston, Cumbria; 54.1938°N 3.0978°W | — | 1829–32 | 3,423 | Anthony Salvin | Gothic Revival with a northwest turret and spire. Chancel added in 1870. Now redundant; it has been used as a sports centre, and since converted into flats. | II |
| Holy Trinity, Horwich, Greater Manchester; 53.5992°N 2.5388°W | | 1830–31 | 5,621 | Francis Octavius Bedford | Gothic Revival with a tower. | II |
| Christ Church, Todmorden, West Yorkshire; 53.7162°N 2.1001°W | | 1830–31 | 3,379 | Lewis Vulliamy | Gothic Revival with a tower. Chancel added 1885. The church was declared redundant in 1992 and converted into residential use in 2003. | II |
| St John the Baptist, Toxteth, Liverpool, Merseyside | — | 1830–31 | 5,262 | William Thomas and W. Kendall | Gothic Revival with a tower. Bombed. | — |
| St John the Divine, Pemberton, Greater Manchester; 53.5369°N 2.6830°W | | 1830–32 | 4,913 | Thomas Rickman and Henry Hutchinson | Gothic Revival with turrets. | II |
| St James, Benwell, Newcastle upon Tyne, Tyne and Wear; 54.9709°N 1.6611°W | | 1831–32 | 1,700 | John Dobson | Gothic Revival with a tower. Chancel added 1895. | II |
| St Nicholas, Hetton-le-Hole, Sunderland, Tyne and Wear | — | 1831–32 | 650 | John Anderson | Gothic Revival with a cupola. Replaced in 1898. | — |
| St George, Hyde, Greater Manchester; 53.4466°N 2.0788°W | | 1831–32 | 4,788 | T. and C. Atkinson | Gothic Revival with a tower. | II |
| St David, Haigh, Greater Manchester; 53.5758°N 2.5961°W | | 1831–33 | 3,433 | Thomas Rickman and Henry Hutchinson | Gothic Revival with a bell turret. | II |
| St John, Smallbridge, Greater Manchester; 53.6338°N 2.1320°W | | 1831–33 | 3,253 | Lewis Vulliamy | Gothic Revival with a bell turret. | II |
| St Stephen, Tockholes, Lancashire; 53.7061°N 2.5169°W | — | 1831–33 | 1,604 | Thomas Rickman and Henry Hutchinson | Gothic Revival style. Replaced in 1965–66, retaining only the front of the south porch. | — |
| Christ Church, Croft, Cheshire; 53.4374°N 2.5433°W | | 1832–33 | 1,457 | Edward Blore | Gothic Revival with a tower and spire. | II |
| St Matthias, Liverpool, Merseyside | — | 1832–33 | 1,000 | Daniel Stewart and J. A. Picton | Neoclassical Ionic in brick and stone. Burnt down 1848. | — |
| St John the Baptist, Bollington, Cheshire; 53.2970°N 2.0930°W | | 1832–34 | 3,475 | William Hayley and Thomas Brown | Gothic Revival with a tower. Gallery added 1854. The church is nowredundant. | II |
| St Clement, Spotland, Greater Manchester; 53.6213°N 2.1771°W | | 1832–34 | 4,056 | Lewis Vulliamy | Gothic Revival with a bell turret. | II |
| St Thomas, Norbury, Hazel Grove, Greater Manchester; 53.3761°N 2.1160°W | | 1833–34 | 2,000 | William Hayley and Thomas Brown | Gothic Revival with a west tower. | II |
| Holy Trinity, Burnley, Lancashire; 53.7897°N 2.2571°W | | 1835–36 | 1,168 | Lewis Vulliamy | Gothic Revival with a tower. Damaged by fire, then converted into flats. | II |
| Holy Trinity, North Shields, Tyne and Wear | — | 1835–36 | 3,594 | John Green | Gothic Revival with a tower. Demolished. | — |
| Christ Church, Adlington, Lancashire; 53.6137°N 2.6043°W | — | 1838 | 400 | Edward Welch | Neo-Norman style. Now a restaurant. | II |
| St Mary, Newton, Hyde, Greater Manchester; 53.4653°N 2.0597°W | | 1838 | 1,018 | William Hayley and Thomas Brown | Neo-Norman with turrets. Chancel added in 1876–77. | II |
| St John the Evangelist, Dukinfield, Greater Manchester; 53.4771°N 2.0726°W | | 1838–40 | 2,599 | Edmund Sharpe | Gothic Revival with a west tower. | II |
| St George, Stalybridge, Greater Manchester; 53.4873°N 2.0578°W | | 1838–40 | 2,712 | Edmund Sharpe | Gothic Revival with a west tower. | II |
| All Souls, Ancoats, Manchester; 53.4804°N 2.2157°W | | 1839–40 | 1,000 | William Hayley | Romanesque Revival in brick with two towers. Redundant 1981, later used as a workshop, and demolished in 2026. | II |
| St John the Baptist, Bretherton, Lancashire; 53.6777°N 2.7951°W | | 1839–40 | 250 | Edmund Sharpe | Gothic Revival with a bell turret. | II |
| St Paul, Farington, Lancashire; 53.7199°N 2.7012°W | | 1839–41 | 500 | Edmund Sharpe | Romanesque Revival style. Chancel added in 1909. | II |
| St George, Kendal, Cumbria; 54.3281°N 2.7435°W | | 1839–41 | 4,242 | George Webster | Gothic Revival with two bell turrets. Chancel added 1911. | — |
| St Andrew, Ayres Quay, Tyne and Wear | — | 1840–41 | 500 | Thomas Moore | Gothic Revival with a spire. | — |
| St Catharine, Scholes, Wigan, Greater Manchester; 53.5463°N 2.6169°W | | 1840–41 | 962 | Edmund Sharpe | Gothic Revival with a tower and spire. | II |
| St Peter, Newcastle upon Tyne, Tyne and Wear | — | 1840–42 | 5,858 | John Dobson | Gothic Revival style. Demolished. | — |
| St Alban, Heworth, Gateshead, Tyne and Wear; 54.9426°N 1.5768°W | | 1841–42 | 200 | Thomas Liddell | Gothic Revival with a belfry. | II |
| Holy Trinity, Pelton, County Durham; 54.7292°N 1.8211°W | | 1841–42 | 300 | George Jackson | Gothic Revival with a tower and spire. | II |
| St Matthew, Stretford, Greater Manchester; 53.4439°N 2.3104°W | | 1841–42 | 300 | William Hayley | Gothic Revival with a tower. Enlarged in 1861; chancel added 1906. | II |
| St Bartholomew, Thornley, County Durham; 54.8716°N 1.6173°W | | 1842 | 250 | Robert Dunlop | Gothic Revival with a belfry. Chancel added late 19th century. | II |
| St Paul, Macclesfield, Cheshire; 53.2573°N 2.1196°W | | 1843–44 | 1,000 | William Hayley | Gothic Revival with a tower and spire. | II |
| Holy Trinity, Blackburn, Lancashire; 53.7511°N 2.4746°W | | 1843–45 | 1,519 | Edmund Sharpe | Gothic Revival with a tower. | II |
| Christ Church, Heaton Norris, Greater Manchester; 53.4144°N 2.1678°W | | 1843–49 | 500 | William Hayley | Gothic Revival with a west tower and steeple. Damaged by fire in 1977 and demolished, apart from the tower and part of the walls. | II |
| Christ Church, Glodwick, Oldham, Greater Manchester | — | 1844 | 500 | A. D. Cuffley | Gothic Revival with a west tower. Restored 1894; demolished other than the tower. | — |
| St Peter, Blackley, Greater Manchester; 53.5235°N 2.2180°W | | 1844–45 | 700 | E. H. Shellard | Gothic Revival style. Enlarged 1880. | II* |
| St James the Great, Morpeth, Northumberland; 55.1700°N 1.6907°W | | 1844–46 | 5,435 | Benjamin Ferrey | Neo-Norman with central tower. | II* |
| St Thomas, Lees, Greater Manchester; 53.5367°N 2.0727°W | | 1844–48 | 850 | E. H. Shellard | Gothic Revival style. Tower added 1855. Church enlarged 1885. | II* |
| St Paul, Ramsbottom, Greater Manchester; 53.6486°N 2.3162°W | | 1844–50 | 350 | Isaac and James Holden | Gothic Revival with a spire. Enlarged in 1866. | — |
| St John the Baptist, Birtle, Greater Manchester; 53.6068°N 2.2597°W | | 1845–46 | 200 | George Shaw | Gothic Revival with a bell gable. | — |
| St Peter, Elworth, Cheshire; 53.1486°N 2.3898°W | | 1845–46 | 150 | John Matthews | Gothic Revival with a bellcote. | — |
| St John, Failsworth, Greater Manchester; 53.5118°N 2.1545°W | | 1845–46 | 500 | E. H. Shellard | Gothic Revival with a west steeple. Toewr added 1878; restored during the 20th century. | II |
| Holy Trinity, Rainow, Cheshire; 53.2801°N 2.0753°W | | 1845–46 | 400 | Samuel Howard | Gothic Revival with a tower. | II |
| St Simon, Salford, Greater Manchester | — | 1845–46 | 500 | Richard Lane | Gothic Revival with a tower and spire. Partly demolished. | — |
| St Stephen, Audenshaw, Greater Manchester; 53.4749°N 2.1153°W | | 1845–47 | 500 | E. H. Shellard | Gothic Revival with a tower. Chancel added 1900. | II |
| St James, Shaw and Crompton, Greater Manchester; 53.5809°N 2.0926°W | | 1845–49 | 250 | Joseph Clarke | Gothic Revival with a southwest tower. Restored 1876. | II |
| Christ Church, Ashton-under-Lyne, Greater Manchester; 53.4937°N 2.1013°W | | 1846–47 | 300 | Dickson and Breakspear | Gothic Revival in brick with an east bell gable. | II |
| St Paul, Westleigh, Leigh, Greater Manchester | | 1846–47 | 400 | William Young | Gothic Revival with a southeast tower and spire. | — |
| St Cuthbert, Bensham, County Durham | | 1846–47 | 200 | John Dobson | Neo-Norman with a southwest tower. Later enlarged; now redundant. | — |
| St Mary, Droylsden, Greater Manchester; 53.4799°N 2.1432°W | | 1846–48 | 500 | E. H. Shellard | Gothic Revival with a tower and spire. | II |
| St James, Burnley, Lancashire | — | 1846–49 | 2,556 | Henry P. Horner | Gothic Revival with a tower and spire. Demolished. | — |
| All Saints, Monkwearmouth, Sunderland, Tyne and Wear; 54.9174°N 1.3796°W | — | 1846–49 | 150 | John Dobson | Gothic Revival with a southwest bell turret. | II |
| St John the Baptist, Heaton Mersey, Greater Manchester; 53.4125°N 2.2069°W | | 1846–50 | 150 | Peter Walker | Gothic Revival with a west tower. Chancel added in 1891. | II |
| St Mark, Antrobus, Cheshire; 53.3123°N 2.5349°W | — | 1847 | 80 | George Gilbert Scott | Gothic Revival with a bell turret. | II |
| St John the Evangelist, Byley, Cheshire; 53.2200°N 2.4172°W | | 1847 | 75 | John Matthews | Neo-Norman, in brick with an open roof. Tower added later. | II |
| St John, Shuttleworth, Ramsbottom, Greater Manchester; 53.6556°N 2.3031°W | | 1847 | 200 | E. H. Shellard | Gothic Revival with bell turrets. | — |
| Christ Church, Walker, Newcastle upon Tyne, Tyne and Wear; 54.9732°N 1.5468°W | | 1847 | 1,222 | Alfred Higham | Gothic Revival with a southeast tower. | II* |
| St Mark, Bredbury, Greater Manchester; 53.4241°N 2.1050°W | | 1847–48 | 250 | E. H. Shellard | Gothic Revival with a west tower. | II |
| Holy Trinity, Coldhurst, Oldham, Greater Manchester; 53.5501°N 2.1173°W | | 1847–48 | 250 | E. H. Shellard | Gothic Revival with a bell tower. Enlarged 1887–91. | II |
| St James, Congleton, Cheshire; 53.1645°N 2.2170°W | | 1847–48 | 350 | James Trubshaw | Gothic Revival with a bell turret and chancel. | — |
| St John, Darlington, County Durham; 54.5229°N 1.5438°W | | 1847–48 | 150 | John Middleton | Gothic Revival with a west tower. | II |
| St John the Evangelist, Hurst, Ashton-under-Lyne, Tameside, Greater Manchester; 53.5002°N 2.0813°W | | 1847–49 | 250 | E. H. Shellard | Gothic Revival with a bell turret. Enlarged in 1862. | II |
| St Peter, Minshull Vernon, Cheshire; 53.1309°N 2.4773°W | | c. 1847–48 | 150 | John Matthews | Gothic Revival with a bell turret. Enlarged in 1902. | II |
| St Michael, Rawtenstall, Lancashire; 53.7201°N 2.2479°W | | 1847–49 | 300 | Joseph Clarke | Gothic Revival with a tower. Closed and converted into a house. | II |
| St John the Evangelist, Birtley, Tyne and Wear; 54.8945°N 1.5737°W | | 1848 | 200 | George Pickering | Neo-Norman with an apse. Enlarged in 1887–89. | II |
| Holy Trinity, Seghill, Northumberland; 55.0691°N 1.5394°W | | 1848 | 1,624 | John Green | Gothic Revival style. | II |
| St Mark, Dukinfield, Greater Manchester; 53.4802°N 2.0954°W | | 1848–49 | 250 | Joseph Clarke | Gothic Revival with a northwest tower. Tower replaced in 1881 and alterations made in 1887. | II |
| Christ Church, Denton, Greater Manchester; 53.4560°N 2.1218°W | | 1848–53 | 250 | George Gilbert Scott | Gothic Revival style. | II |
| St John the Baptist, Godley, Greater Manchester; 53.4549°N 2.0644°W | | 1849 | 400 | E. H. Shellard | Gothic Revival style. West tower added 1878. | II |
| St Peter, Macclesfield, Cheshire; 53.2534°N 2.1179°W | | 1849 | 257 | Charles and James Trubshaw | Gothic Revival style. | II |
| St Paul, Danebridge, Cheshire | — | c. 1849 | 150 | Joseph Clarke | Demolished 1904. | — |
| St Cuthbert, Benfieldside, County Durham; 54.8682°N 1.8568°W | | 1849–50 | 200 | John Dobson | Gothic Revival style. Enlarged in 1881–86. | II |
| St Peter, Chorley, Lancashire; 53.6606°N 2.6236°W | | 1849–50 | 250 | Charles Reed | Gothic Revival style. Transepts added in 1911. | II |
| Christ Church, Healey, Greater Manchester; 53.6379°N 2.1741°W | | 1849–50 | 150 | George Shaw | Gothic Revival style. | II |
| St John the Evangelist, Kingsley, Cheshire; 53.2701°N 2.6800°W | — | 1849–50 | 150 | George Gilbert Scott | Gothic Revival with a west tower. | II |
| St Paul, Portwood, Stockport, Greater Manchester | — | 1849–50 | 300 | Henry Bowman and J. S. Crowther | Gothic Revival with a tower, spire and chancel. Demolished. | — |
| St Margaret, Prestwich, Greater Manchester; 53.5377°N 2.2689°W | | 1849–51 | 50 | Henry Travis and William Mangnall | Gothic Revival with gabled aisles. Additions in the later 19th century. Damaged by fire in 1985 and restored. | — |
| Holy Trinity, Hartlepool, County Durham; 54.6588°N 1.1888°W | | 1850–51 | 250 | John Middleton | Gothic Revival with no tower. Altered in 1864 and 1891. | II |
| St Thomas, Helmshore, Lancashire; 53.6872°N 2.3302°W | | 1850–51 | 200 | E. H. Shellard | Gothic Revival with west tower. | II |
| St Saviour, Ringley, Kearsley, Greater Manchester; 53.5436°N 2.3570°W | | 1850–54 | 200 | Sharpe and Paley | Previous church replaced, apart from the small tower. Gothic Revival style. | II |
| St Paul, Hendon, Sunderland, Tyne and Wear | — | 1851–52 | 150 | John Dobson | Gothic Revival. Enlarged 1857, since demolished. | — |
| St Mark, Hulme, Greater Manchester | — | 1851–52 | 250 | E. H. Shellard | Gothic Revival. Demolished. | — |
| St Paul, Burnley, Lancashire | — | 1852–53 | 150 | Walker Rawstorne | Neo-Norman with a tower and spire. Demolished. | — |
| St Thomas, Werneth, Oldham, Greater Manchester; 53.5347°N 2.1229°W | | 1853–55 | 125 | Andrew Trimen and George Shaw | Gothic Revival style. Enlarged in 1868 and the 1880s. | II |
| St Alban, Pinfold, Rochdale, Greater Manchester | — | 1854–56 | 100 | Joseph Clarke | Gothic Revival with a tower and spire. Demolished about 1971. | — |
| St Paul, Paddington, Salford, Greater Manchester; 53.4875°N 2.2842°W | | 1855–56 | 220 | E. H. Shellard | Gothic Revival with a bell turret. | — |
| All Souls, Vauxhall, Liverpool, Merseyside | — | 1856 | 200 | Arthur Holme | Gothic Revival. Demolished. | — |
| St Luke's Church, Cheetham, Manchester | — | 1836-1839 | | T. W. Atkinson | Gothic Revival. Derelict. | II |

== See also ==
- List of Commissioners' churches in eastern England
- List of Commissioners' churches in the English Midlands
- List of Commissioners' churches in London
- List of Commissioners' churches in southwest England
- List of Commissioners' churches in Wales
- List of Commissioners' churches in Yorkshire
