= St Peter's Church, Ashton-under-Lyne =

Coordinates: 53.4840°N 2.1058°W

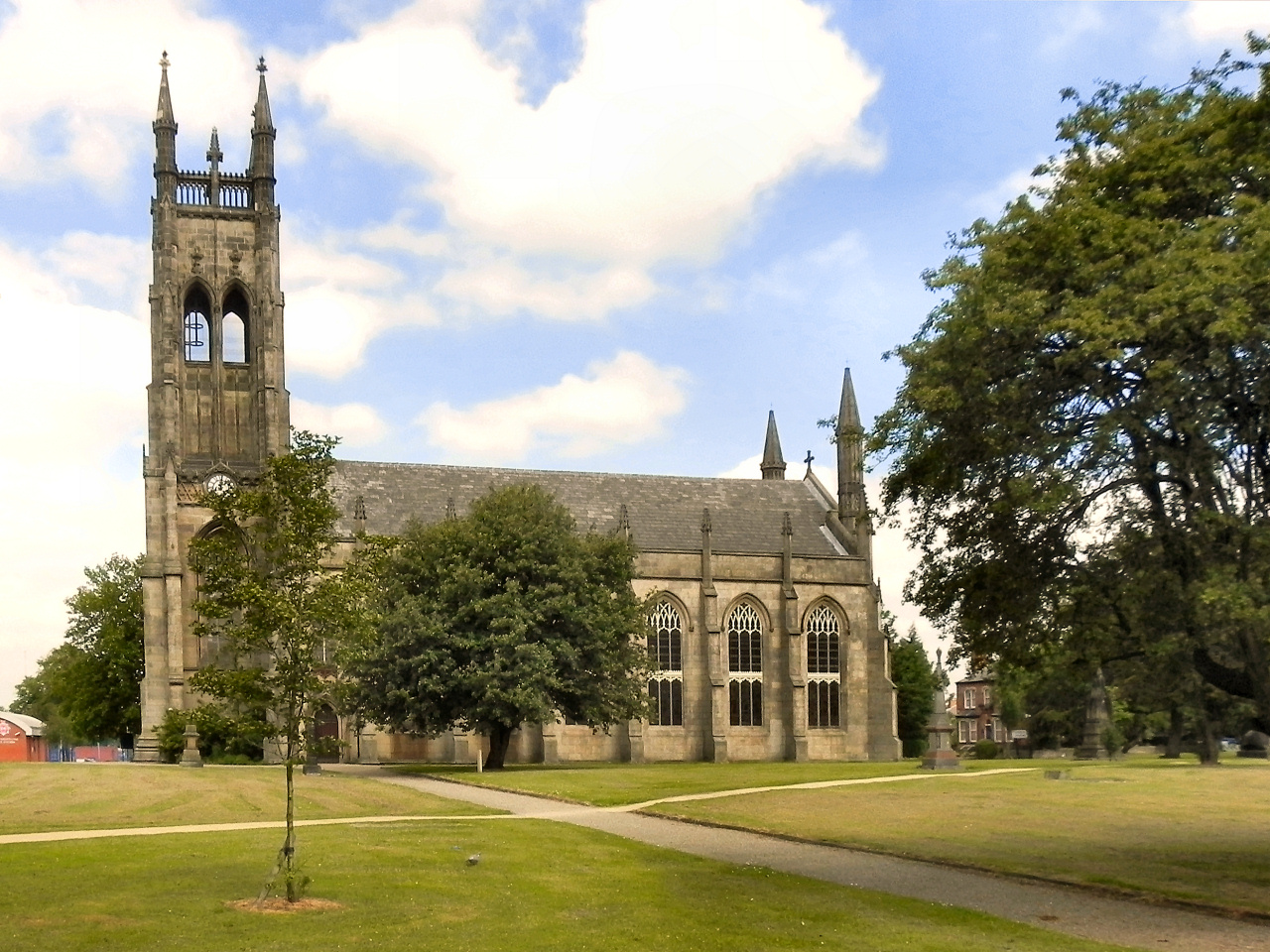
- The Church of St Peter from the south

- Location in Greater Manchester
- OS grid reference: SJ 931 986
- Location: Manchester Road, Ashton-under-Lyne, Greater Manchester
- Country: England
- Denomination: Anglican
- Churchmanship: Open evangelical
- Website: St Peter, Ashton-under-Lyne

History
- Status: Parish church
- Dedication: Saint Peter

Architecture
- Functional status: Active
- Heritage designation: Grade II*
- Designated: 12 January 1967
- Architect: Francis Goodwin
- Architectural type: Church
- Style: Gothic Revival
- Groundbreaking: 1821
- Completed: 1824

Specifications
- Materials: Stone, slate roof

Administration
- Province: York
- Diocese: Manchester
- Archdeaconry: Rochdale
- Deanery: Ashton-under-Lyne
- Parish: The Good Shepherd, Ashton-under-Lyne

Clergy
- Bishop: Rt Revd Dr David Walker
- Vicar: Revd Josie Partridge

St Peter's Church is in Manchester Road, Ashton-under-Lyne, Greater Manchester, England. It is an active Anglican parish church in the deanery of Ashton-under-Lyne, the archdeaconry of Rochdale, and the diocese of Manchester.

With four other local churches, it is part of the Parish of the Good Shepherd, Ashton-under-Lyne. The church is recorded in the National Heritage List for England as a designated Grade II* listed building. It is a Commissioners' Church, having received a grant towards its construction from the Church Building Commission. The authors of the Buildings of England series consider it to be a "large and ambitious" church. In the National Heritage List for England it is described as a "particularly imposing and elaborate example of a Commissioners' Church".

== History ==
St Peter's was built between 1821 and 1824, and was designed by Francis Goodwin. A grant of £13,191 (equivalent to £1,250,000 in 2025) was given towards its construction by the Church Building Commission. The land for the church was given by the patron of the advowson, George 6th Earl of Stamford and Warrington, whose cousin, Revd Sir George Booth, had been Rector of Ashton from 1758 until 1797. It was the first of three churches designed by Goodwin for the Commission in the Manchester area. In 1840 a clock was installed with its face at the east end, the mechanism at the west end, and connected by a drive shaft running the length of the church. During the latter part of the 20th century, the west end was divided under the gallery.

== Architecture ==
=== Exterior ===
The church is constructed in ashlar stone with a slate roof. Its plan consists of a seven-bay nave with a canted vestry at the east end acting as a chancel. At the west end is a tower. The tower is in three stages with buttresses at the corners rising to piers surmounted by pinnacles. It has a west door over which is a three-stage window. At a higher level are clock faces under gablets. In the top stage are pairs of open pointed arches acting as bell openings. The parapet is also open and is traceried. Each bay of the nave contains a three-light transomed window. These contain tracery in Perpendicular style constructed in cast iron and painted to look like stone. Between the bays are buttresses rising to pinnacles. The pinnacles at the corners of the church are crocketed. At the east end is a rose window, above which is a clock face in the gable.

=== Interior ===
There are galleries on three sides in the church, carried on quatrefoil cast iron columns. The church originally contained box pews but these, and many other furnishings, have since been removed. The stained glass in the east rose window dates from the 1830s, and is by David Evans, of Shrewsbury; it depicts the twelve apostles. On the north side of the church is a window by W. Pointer dating from 1923, and three windows by Curtis, Ward and Hughes from the 1890s and 1901. The south side includes windows by Lavers and Westlake. The three-manual organ was built in 1831 by Samuel Renn, and rebuilt in 1959 by J. J. Binns. There is a ring of eight bells, all cast in 1871 by Mears and Stainbank of the Whitechapel Bell Foundry.

== External features ==
The churchyard contains the war grave of a Royal Garrison Artillery soldier of World War I.

== See also ==
- Grade II* listed buildings in Greater Manchester
- Listed buildings in Ashton-under-Lyne
- List of churches in Greater Manchester
- List of Commissioners' churches in Northeast and Northwest England
- List of works by Francis Goodwin
