= St Thomas' Church, Pendleton =

Coordinates: 53.4921°N 2.2857°W

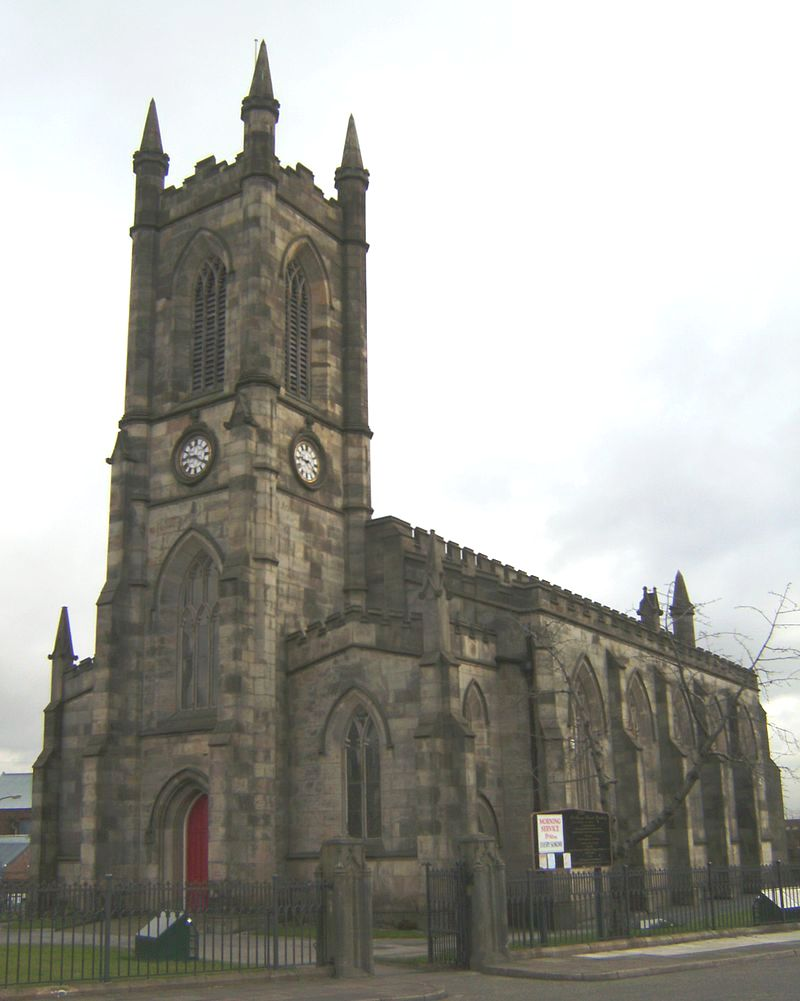
- St Thomas' Church, Pendleton, from the southwest

- Location in Greater Manchester
- OS grid reference: SJ 811 995
- Location: Broad Street, Pendleton, Salford, Greater Manchester
- Country: England
- Denomination: Anglican
- Churchmanship: Modern Catholic
- Website: St Thomas, Pendleton

History
- Status: Parish church
- Founded: 1767; 259 years ago
- Founder: Samuel Brierley
- Dedication: Saint Thomas

Architecture
- Functional status: Active
- Heritage designation: Grade II
- Designated: 18 January 1980
- Architect(s): Francis Goodwin and Richard Lane
- Architectural type: Church
- Style: Gothic Revival
- Groundbreaking: 1829
- Completed: 1831

Specifications
- Materials: Stone

Administration
- Province: York
- Diocese: Manchester
- Archdeaconry: Salford & Leigh
- Deanery: Salford & Leigh
- Parish: Pendleton and Claremont

Clergy
- Rector: Rev Peter Bennett

St Thomas' Church is on Broad Street, Pendleton, Salford, Greater Manchester, England. It is an active Anglican parish church in the deanery of Salford, the archdeaconry of Salford, and the diocese of Manchester. Its benefice is united with those of five nearby churches including St Aidan’s, Lower Kersal; St Luke’s, Weaste; Emmanuel LEP, Langworthy and Holy Angels, Claremont to form the Salford All Saints' Team Ministry. The church is designated by English Heritage as a Grade II listed building. It was a Commissioners' church, having received a grant towards its construction from the Church Building Commission.

== History ==
The church was built between 1829 and 1831 to a design by Francis Goodwin and Richard Lane. A grant of £6,673 (equivalent to £600,000 in 2025) was given towards its construction by the Church Building Commission.

== Architecture ==
=== Exterior ===
St Thomas' is constructed in ashlar stone. The architectural style is Gothic Revival. Its plan consists of a five-bay nave, north and south aisles, a chancel and a west tower. The tower is in three stages with polygonal pilasters at the corners, and an embattled parapet with pinnacles. It has a west door with a three-light window above, porches on the north and south sides, clock faces, and three-light bell openings. The aisles also have embattled parapets, and each bay contains a three-light window with Decorated tracery. At the east end of the aisles are blind windows. The chancel has a lancet window on the north and south sides, a six-light east window with Perpendicular tracery, and polygonal buttresses.

=== Interior ===
Inside the church the arcades are carried on slim Perpendicular piers. There are galleries on three sides. The west gallery has a canopy carved with the royal arms of William IV. The side galleries have been filled in for use as a chapel and meeting rooms. The stained glass in the chapel is by Hardman and depicts scenes from the life of Saint Thomas. The glass in the east window, dating from the 1840s, is also probably by Hardman. The three-manual organ was built in 1839 by Samuel Renn and restored in about 1920 by Jardine and Company. There is a ring of eight bells, all cast in 1906 by John Taylor & Co.

=== External features ===
The churchyard contains the war graves of four soldiers of the First World War, who are all commemorated by special memorial, and a soldier of the Second World War.

== Notable people ==
- Leal Douglas, Australian actress, was christened at St Thomas's in 1881.

== See also ==
- List of churches in Greater Manchester
- Listed buildings in Salford, Greater Manchester
- List of Commissioners' churches in Northeast and Northwest England
- List of works by Francis Goodwin
