= St James' Church, Oldham =

Coordinates: 53.5458°N 2.0954°W

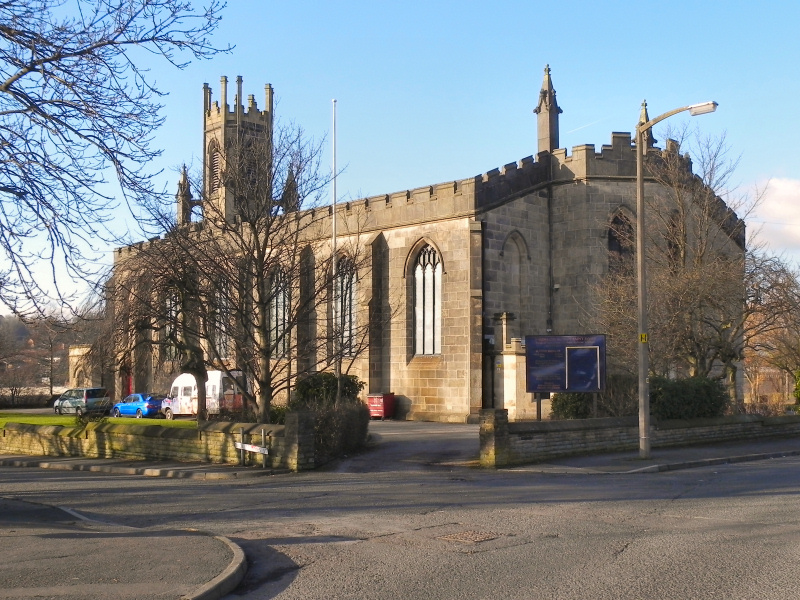
- St James' Church, Oldham. from the southeast

- Location in Greater Manchester
- OS grid reference: SD 938 055
- Location: Barry Street, Greenacres Moor, Oldham, Greater Manchester
- Country: England
- Denomination: Anglican
- Churchmanship: Anglo-Catholic
- Website: St James, Oldham

History
- Status: Parish church

Architecture
- Functional status: Active
- Heritage designation: Grade II
- Designated: 8 March 1993
- Architect: Francis Goodwin
- Architectural type: Church
- Style: Gothic Revival
- Groundbreaking: 1827
- Completed: 1829
- Construction cost: £9,652

Specifications
- Materials: Stone, slate roofs

Administration
- Province: York
- Diocese: Manchester
- Archdeaconry: Rochdale
- Deanery: Oldham and Ashton
- Parish: St. James with St. Ambrose Oldham

Clergy
- Bishop: Rt Rev. Stephen Race (AEO)
- Rector: Rev. Lewis Oliver-Hemmings-Faye

St James' Church is in Barry Street, Greenacres Moor, Oldham, Greater Manchester, England. It is an active Anglican parish church in the deanery of Oldham East, the archdeaconry of Rochdale, and the diocese of Manchester. The church is recorded in the National Heritage List for England as a designated Grade II listed building. It was a Commissioners' church, having received a grant towards its construction from the Church Building Commission.

== History ==
The foundation stone was laid by James Lees of Higher Clarksfield on 3 September 1827. The church was built between 1827 and 1829 to a design by Francis Goodwin. A grant of £9,652 (equivalent to £920,000 in 2025) was given towards its construction by the Church Building Commission. The original commission for the design was won by Charles Barry, but he underestimated the cost of the church, and was replaced when the tenders were received. The apse was added in 1883 by John Lowe of Manchester.

== Architecture ==
=== Exterior ===
St James is constructed in ashlar stone with Welsh slate roofs. Its plan consists of a nave, north and south aisles, a shallow canted apse at the east end, a west tower, and vestries to the north and south of the tower. The tower has a west door with a two-light window above it, and clasping buttresses topped with gables. Over the second stage is a parapet with an integral surround for a clock face. Above this flying buttresses support an octagonal lantern that contains bell openings. The parapet is embattled. There is another doorway on the south side of the church. The aisles are of six bays, separated by buttresses, each bay containing a two-light window with Decorated cast iron tracery. The chancel also contains two-light windows.

=== Interior ===
Inside the church are galleries on three sides. The chancel screen with a rood loft date from the 1920s, and were built as a memorial to the First World War. There is a central ogee-headed arch, over which is a crucifix. At the sides of this are panels with inscriptions under statues of Saint George and Saint Michael. In the chancel are a canopied reredos and a sedilia. The stained glass includes windows by Shrigley and Hunt.

== Present day ==
The Parish of St. James with St. Ambrose Oldham is part of the Archdeaconry of Rochdale in the Diocese of Manchester.

St James' Church is part of the Anglo-Catholic tradition of the Church of England. As the parish rejects the ordination of women, it is a member of Forward in Faith and receives alternative episcopal oversight from the Bishop of Beverley (currently Stephen Race).

== See also ==
- List of churches in Greater Manchester
- List of Commissioners' churches in Northeast and Northwest England
- Listed buildings in Oldham
- List of works by Francis Goodwin
