= Listed buildings in Henbury, Cheshire =

Henbury is a civil parish in Cheshire East, England. It contains 25 buildings that are recorded in the National Heritage List for England as designated listed buildings, all of which are at Grade II. This grade is the lowest of the three gradings given to listed buildings and is applied to "buildings of national importance and special interest". The parish contains the village of Henbury, and Henbury Hall with its grounds, but is otherwise rural. Most of the listed buildings are houses, cottages, farmhouses, farm buildings and associated structures. Also listed are buildings associated with Henbury Hall. The other listed structures include a church and its lychgate, a pinfold, and a milepost.

Name and location	Photograph	Date	Notes
Stable block, Henbury Hall; 53.25367°N 2.19685°W	—	Mid- to late 17th century	Originating as a timber-framed barn with brick infill, it was encased in brick in 1742, and has a slate roof. It is in a single storey, and its features include archways, doorways, a circular window, circular pitch holes, and casement windows.
Henbury Hall; 53.25345°N 2.19673°W		Late 17th century	This originated as a stable, and was converted into a country house in the 1950s. It is in rendered brick with stone dressings and a slate roof. The house is in two storeys, and has a front of nine bays. The former archways and pitch holes have been glazed. The other windows are mullioned and/or transomed. In the centre is an octagonal cupola with clock faces and louvered openings. On the west gable is an octagonal domed bellcote with a ball finial and a weathervane.
Pale Farm; 53.26100°N 2.20364°W	—	Late 17th century	Originally a farmhouse, this is timber-framed on a stone plinth with rendered infill and a stone slate roof. It is in two storeys, the upper storey being slightly jettied, and has an L-shaped plan. The windows are casements.
Glebe Cottage; 53.24357°N 2.22435°W	—	Late 17th to early 18th century	The cottage is timber-framed with brick infill and has a thatched roof. It is in a single storey, and the windows are casements. There is a central porch.
Stables, Davenport Hayes; 53.26054°N 2.18150°W	—	1733	The stables were converted into domestic use in 1975. The building is in whitewashed brick and has a stone slate roof. It is two storeys and has a symmetrical five-bay front. The central bay projects forward under a pediment which contains a date stone and a former pitch hole converted into a porthole. The former stable doors have been replaced by windows.
Stable block, Birtles Old Hall; 53.26348°N 2.20945°W	—	Mid-18th century	The stable block is in brick with stone dressings and a slate roof. It is in two storeys, and has a four-bay front. Over the left end is a hipped roof, and the other bays have a pedimented gable. There is a doorway in the ground floor and four windows in the upper floor.
Kitchen garden walls, Henbury Hall; 53.25522°N 2.19473°W	—	Mid-18th century	The walls surround the kitchen garden, and are in brick with stone copings. They are about 12 feet (3.7 m) high, and are buttressed. There are oval recesses, doorways, and a gateway. The north wall is higher and accommodates a 19th-century glasshouse.
Roadside Cottage; 53.24566°N 2.21022°W	—	1760	The cottage is in brick with a slate roof and is in two storeys. The original part has a symmetrical three-bay front. The central bay projects slightly forward, and has a gable containing a date stone. An additional wing was built to the right in 1979.
The Cave; 53.25175°N 2.19930°W	—	Mid- to late 18th century	This originated as a gamekeeper's cottage. It is in brick on a stone plinth, and has stone dressings and a stone slate roof. The entrance front is symmetrical with three bays, and has a central pedimented gable containing a circular panel. The windows are sashes. During the 20th century two square pavilions with pyramidal roofs were added to the sides.
Gate piers, Thorneycroft Lodge; 53.24151°N 2.19049°W	—	Mid- to late 18th century	The gate piers are at the entrance to Siddington Manor. They have a square plan and stand on projecting plinths. They consist of rusticated blocks with moulded caps, and have pineapple finials.
Henbury Smithy; 53.25121°N 2.20706°W	—	Mid- to late 18th century	This originated as a smithy and a blacksmith's cottage, and was later converted into two cottages. It is built in brick with a slate roof, and is in two storeys. It has a five-bay front, the middle three bays projecting forwards. The windows are casements.
Bearhurst Farm; 53.24540°N 2.19625°W	—	Late 18th century	This is a brick farmhouse with a stone tiled roof. It is in two storeys and has a symmetrical three-bay front. The windows are sashes. There have been later extensions.
Horseshoe Cottage; 53.25471°N 2.18790°W		Late 18th century	A lodge to Henbury Hall, in brick with stone dressings, and with a hipped slate roof. It has two storeys. The drive front is in three bays with a central protruding gabled porch. Above the porch is a stone shield. On the right side is a canted two-storey bay window, and there are three bays on the left side of the house. All the windows are sashes with stone sills, lintels, and hood moulds. On the corners of the house are clasping pilasters.
Fir Tree Cottage; 53.26482°N 2.19889°W	—	Late 18th or early 19th century	A brick house with stone slate roofs. It is in two storeys and has a four-bay front. The doorway is to the right of centre and has a trellis porch. The windows are three-light casements.
Pinfold; 53.25140°N 2.20696°W	—	18th or 19th century	The pinfold is a circular stone structure about 4 feet (1.2 m) high. There is an opening in the southwest, and the coping has been replaced by cement.
The Mount; 53.26413°N 2.18290°W	—	c. 1820	A stuccoed brick house with a hipped tile roof. It is in two storeys and has a symmetrical garden front of three bays. On each corner are paired pilasters. The windows are sashes, and there is a central chimney stack with eight flues.
Davenport Heyes; 53.26065°N 2.18179°W	—	Early 19th century	A brick house with stone dressings and a stone slate roof. It is in three storeys and has a symmetrical three-bay front. The middle bay projects forward, it is pedimented and incorporates a porch.
Yew Tree Farmhouse; 53.26116°N 2.18836°W	—	Early 19th century	The farmhouse is in brick with a slate roof. It is in two storeys and has a symmetrical three-bay front. Above the central door is a fanlight. The windows are sashes.
Milepost; 53.26097°N 2.20602°W	—	c. 1830	The milepost is on the north side of Chelford Road. It consists of a round post with an acorn finial and a palte inscribed with the distances in miles to Birtles and to Macclesfield.
St Thomas' Church; 53.25946°N 2.17923°W		1844–45	The church was designed by Richard Lane, and the chancel was added in about 1870. It is built in stone and has a tiled roof. The church consists of a nave, a chancel, a vestry, and a west tower surmounted by a broach spire. It is in Gothic Revival style, and inside is a west gallery.
Ice house, Henbury Hall; 53.25390°N 2.19627°W	—	19th century	The icehouse is in brick, and consists of a barrel vaulted corridor leading to a circular chamber. It has a semicircular archway at the entrance with a wrought iron gate. The chamber has a domed roof, a dished floor and a circular drain.
Bridge over weir, Henbury Hall; 53.25342°N 2.19413°W	—	c. 1870	The bridge crosses the weir between the upper and lower lakes. It is in stone, and consists of a single basket arch. The bridge has rusticated voussoirs and quoins, and a plain keystone.
Lychgate, St Thomas' Church; 53.25984°N 2.17926°W	—	c. 1870	The lychgate is in timber on a stone plinth with a tiled roof. It is two bays deep, and is gabled with decorative bargeboards.
Vicarage; 53.25971°N 2.17974°W	—	c. 1890	The vicarage was designed by James Stevens, and is in stone with a tiled roof. It is in two storeys, and has a symmetrical three-bay front with a gabled porch. The vicarage has a double-pile plane, and has steep gables with decorative bargeboards. The windows are casements.
Henbury and Broken Cross War Memorial; 53.25931°N 2.17837°W	—	c. 1920	The war memorial is in the churchyard of St Thomas' Church. It is in sandstone, and consists of a Celtic-style wheel-cross head on a tapering shaft. The cross-head has a carved boss with decorative knotwork around it. The shaft is on a square plinth on three steps. The plinth carries inscriptions, including the names of those lost in the two World Wars.

== See also ==
- Listed buildings in Gawsworth
- Listed buildings in Macclesfield
- Listed buildings in Nether Alderley
- Listed buildings in Over Alderley
- Listed buildings in Siddington
