= Holy Trinity Church, Bolton =

Church in Greater Manchester, England

Coordinates: 53.5739°N 2.4268°W

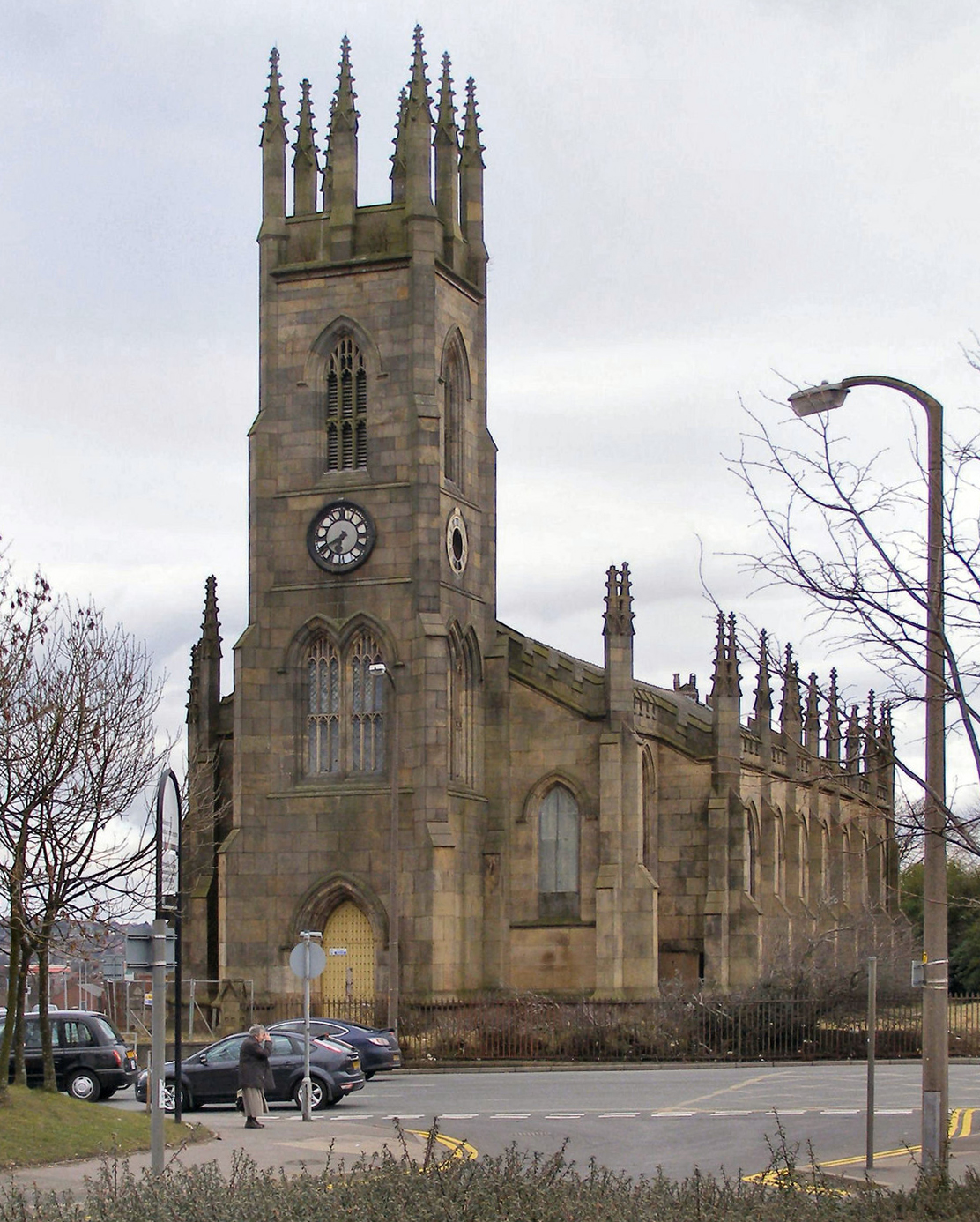
- Holy Trinity Church, Bolton, seen from the west

- Location in Greater Manchester
- OS grid reference: SD718086
- Location: Trinity Street, Bolton, Greater Manchester
- Country: England
- Denomination: Church of England

History
- Status: Parish church
- Dedication: Holy Trinity

Architecture
- Functional status: Redundant
- Heritage designation: Grade II
- Designated: 26 April 1974
- Architect: Philip Hardwick
- Architectural type: Church
- Style: Gothic Revival
- Groundbreaking: 1823
- Completed: 1825
- Construction cost: £13,924
- Closed: 1993

Specifications
- Materials: Stone, slate roofs

Holy Trinity Church, Bolton is a redundant Church of England parish church in Trinity Street, Bolton, Greater Manchester, England. It a Grade II listed building. It was a Commissioners' church, having received a grant towards its construction from the Church Building Commission.

== History ==
Holy Trinity was designed by Philip Hardwick and built in 1823–25. A grant of £13,924 (equivalent to £1,130,000 in 2025) was given towards its construction by the Church Building Commission. The church was declared redundant on 1 July 1993. The church was carefully restored and converted into an apartment building in 2014

== Architecture ==
=== Exterior ===
The church is faced with ashlar stone and has slate roofs. It is a Gothic Revival building in Perpendicular style. It has a seven-bay nave, a shallow chancel with a vestry to the east, and a west tower.

The tower is in four stages with angle buttresses. It has a west doorway, above which is a pair of tiered windows. The third stage has clock dials, and in the top stage are three-light bell openings. On the summit are crocketed pinnacles at the corners and at the midpoint on each side.

The nave bays are separated by buttresses. These are topped by crocketed pinnacles, which are linked by an embattled parapet. In each bay is a three-light tiered window. The chancel has a lancet window on the north and south sides, and a nine-light east window.

=== Interior ===
Inside the church are galleries on three sides, the lateral galleries being carried on five-bay arcades. Both nave and chancel have vaulted ceilings. On each side of the chancel arch are paintings, one of which depicts the Nativity and the other the Ascension. Most of the fittings and furniture have been removed.

John Nicholson built the three-manual organ in 1860 for Manchester Cathedral. Jardine and Company moved the organ to Holy Trinity in 1874 and rebuilt it in 1905. Rushworth and Dreaper overhauled it in 1957 and 1960.

== See also ==
- List of Commissioners' churches in Northeast and Northwest England
- Listed buildings in Bolton
