= Church Building Act =

Stock short title used in UK legislation

Church Building Act is a stock short title used in the United Kingdom for legislation relating to the building of churches.

== List ==
The Church of Scotland Act 1824 (5 Geo. 4. c. 90) is sometimes referred to as the Church Building (Scotland) Act 1824.

The Church Building Acts 1818 to 1884 is the collective title of the following Acts:

- The Church Building Act 1818 (58 Geo. 3. c 45)
- The Church Building Act 1819 (59 Geo. 3. c 134)
- The Church Building Act 1822 (3 Geo. 4. c 72)
- The Church Building Act 1824 (5 Geo. 4. c. 103)
- The Church Building Act 1827 (7 & 8 Geo. 4. c. 72)
- The Church Building Act 1831 (1 & 2 Will. 4. c. 38)
- The Church Building Act 1832 (2 & 3 Will. 4. c. 61)
- The Church Building Act 1838 (1 & 2 Vict. c. 107)
- The Church Building Act 1839 (2 & 3 Vict. c. 49)
- The Church Building Act 1840 (3 & 4 Vict. c. 60)
- The Church Building (Banns and Marriages) Act 1844 (7 & 8 Vict. c. 56)
- The Church Building Act 1845 (8 & 9 Vict. c. 70)
- The Church Building (Burial Service in Chapels) Act 1846 (9 & 10 Vict. c. 68)
- The Church Building Act 1848 (11 & 12 Vict. c. 37)
- The Church Building Act 1851 (14 & 15 Vict. c. 97)
- The Church Building Act 1854 (17 & 18 Vict. c. 32)
- The Church Building Commissioners (Transfer of Powers) Act 1856 (19 & 20 Vict. c. 55)
- The New Parishes Acts and Church Building Acts Amendment Act 1869 (32 & 33 Vict. c. 94)
- The New Parishes Acts and Church Building Acts Amendment Act 1884 (47 & 48 Vict. c. 65)

== See also ==
- List of short titles
- Church Act 1836
