= Macclesfield Town Hall =

Municipal building in Macclesfield, Cheshire, England

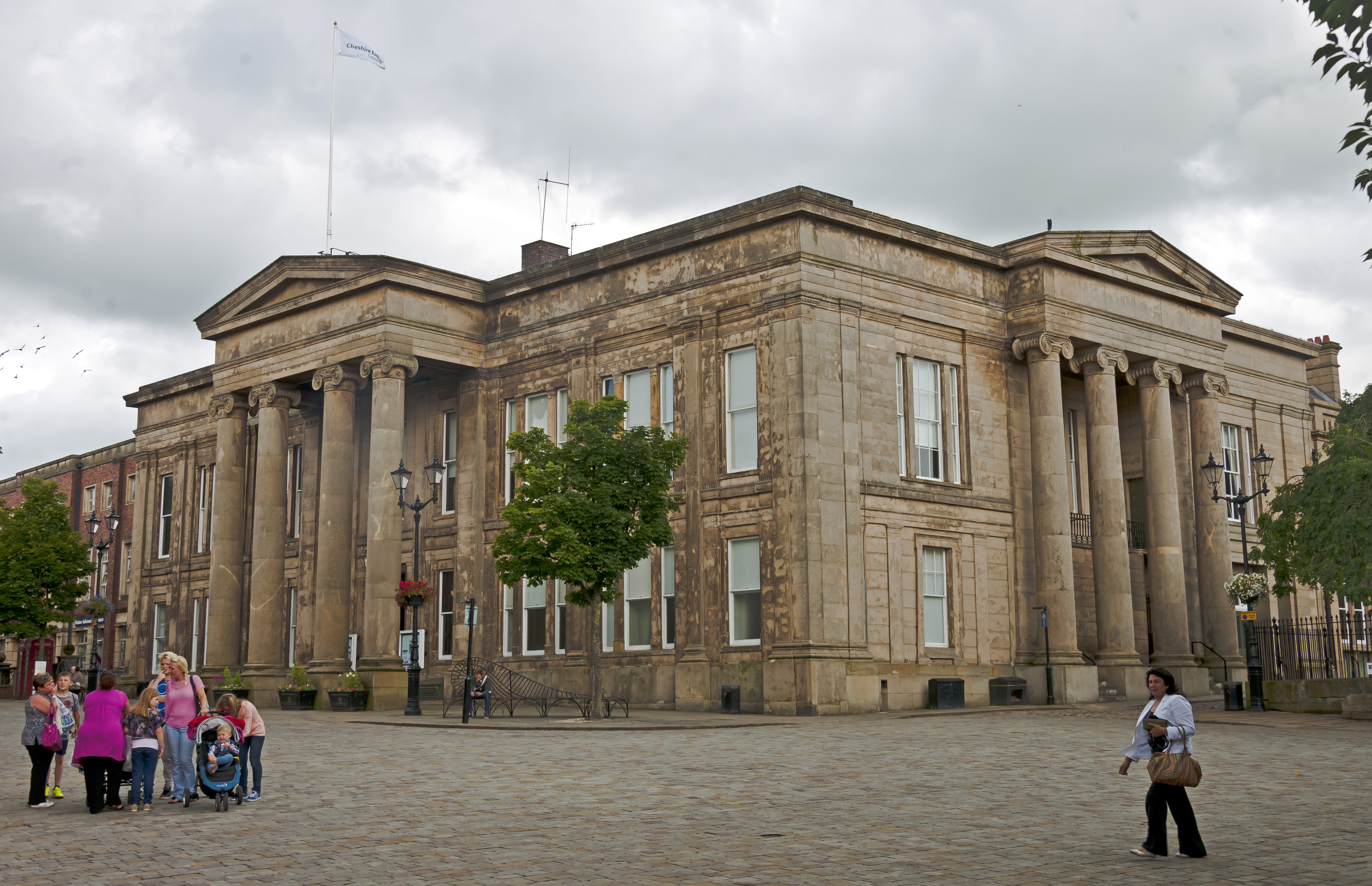
- Macclesfield Town Hall exterior

- Shown in Cheshire
- 53°15′37″N 2°07′27″W
- Location: Market Place, Macclesfield

History
- Built: 1824

Site notes
- Architect: Francis Goodwin
- Architectural style: Greek Revival style

Listed Building – Grade II*
- Designated: 17 March 1977
- Reference no.: 1206935

Macclesfield Town Hall is a Georgian municipal building in the Market Place of Macclesfield, Cheshire, England. Dating originally from 1823–24, it was designed by Francis Goodwin in the Greek Revival style, and extended in 1869–71 by James Stevens and again in 1991–92. The building incorporates the former Borough Police Station. The town hall is listed at grade II*.

== History ==
The first structure on this site was a medieval guildhall which dated back to at least the 13th century and which was connected to a bakehouse on the north side. The foundation stone for the current town hall was laid on 4 September 1823. It was designed by Francis Goodwin in the Greek Revival style and completed in 1824. It was extended between 1869 and 1871 to a design by James Stevens and again between 1991 and 1992.

The Duke and Duchess of Gloucester attended a reception at the town hall, to celebrate the 750th anniversary of the granting of a charter to the town, on 19 July 2011.

== Location and description ==
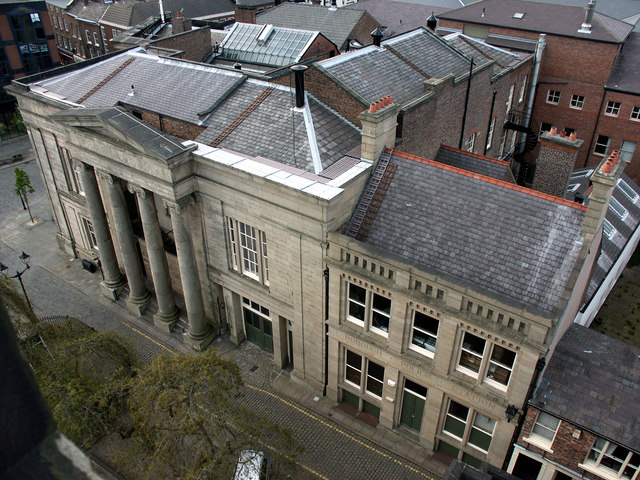
Aerial view, showing the Churchside façade and Borough Police Station (right)

The town hall stands at SJ 91748 73738 on Churchside and Chestergate in Macclesfield's Market Place.

The two-storey ashlar building is in Greek Revival style. The original design is similar to Francis Goodwin's previous design for the (now-demolished) Manchester Old Town Hall, and is modelled on the Erechtheion in Athens. The Churchside façade of 1823–24, which Clare Hartwell and co-authors describe as "a little constricted", has a large central portico with four plain (unfluted) Ionic columns topped with a pediment. The portico is flanked by single bays, with sash windows divided into three parts on the first floor. On the ground floor is a simple sash window to the left-hand side and a double doorway to the right.

A wider west front on Chestergate in the same style was added in 1869–71 by James Stevens, a local architect from the town. It has nine bays, with a central portico that matches the Churchside one. The doorway, now the building's main entrance, is topped with an architrave of polished granite. Flanking the portico are three bays delineated by pilasters. The inner two bays have sash windows to both ground and first floors that are divided into three parts by pilasters. Stevens' design also included a steeple that was not built.

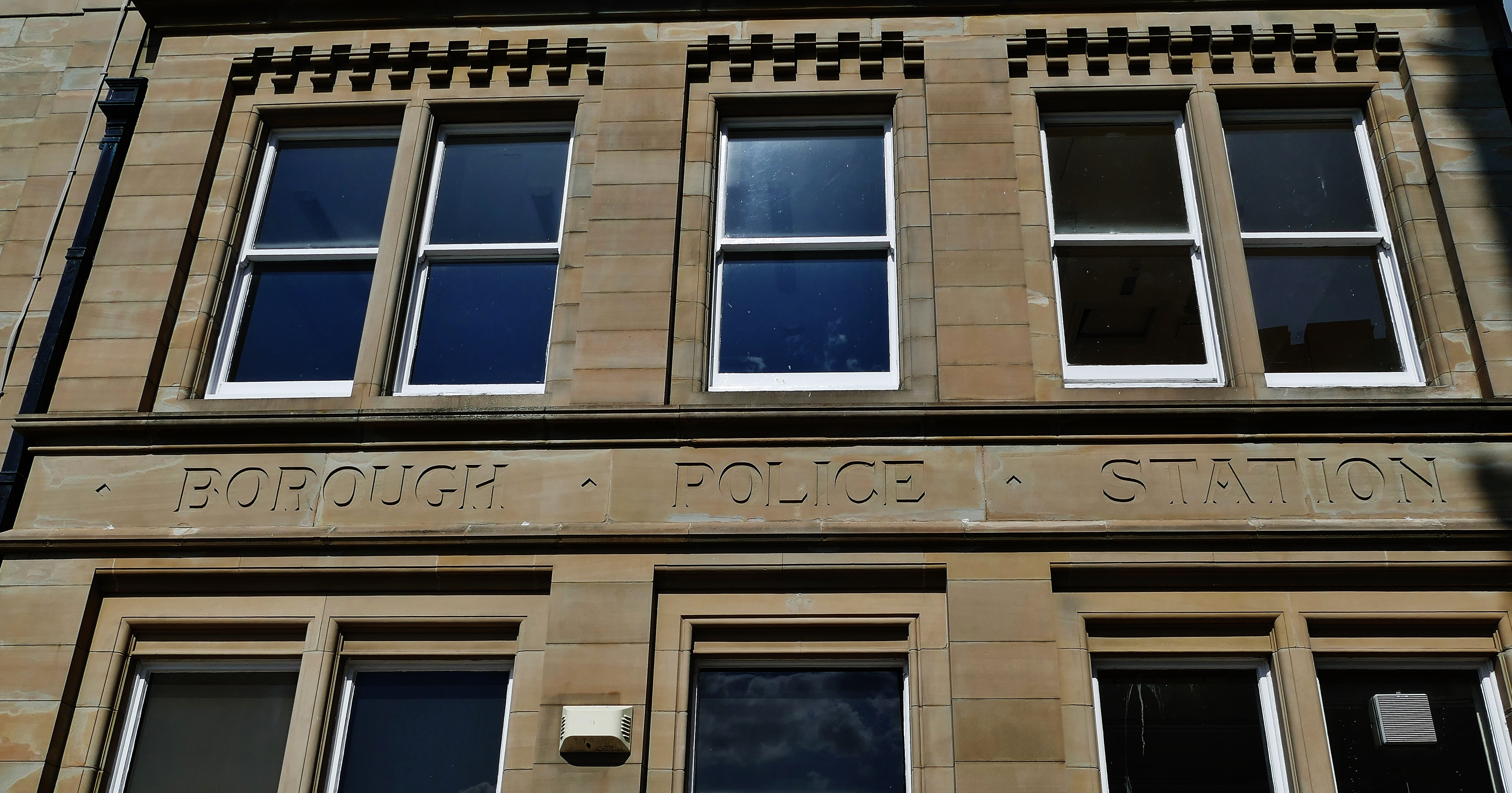
Detail of Borough Police Station

The building incorporates the former Borough Police Station at what now forms the rear. Added by Stevens, it adjoins Goodwin's Churchside façade. The entrance is flanked by paired sash windows. Over the ground floor is carved "BOROUGH POLICE STATION".

The extension of 1991–92, by Conder UK and HLM Architects, is a Georgian-style, two-storey office building, in red brick with faux stone dressings.

The courtyard contains stones from the porch of Macclesfield Castle, dating from around 1398.

=== Interior ===
The Assembly Room on the first floor retains the original Goodwin decoration. It occupies the building's entire east side, with six columns matching the exterior portico running down each side, immediately adjacent to the walls. It has a large chandelier. Much of the remaining interior, including the Council Chamber and Grand Stair, is attributed to Stevens in around 1870, and is described by Hartwell et al. as "very Victorian." The Council Chamber on the first floor has pilasters in pairs on the walls and a coffered ceiling. The Grand Stair is roofed by a domed lantern with painted glass. Its stone staircase has a cast-iron balustrade, which incorporates lights on the newel posts.

The "Picture Book", a sculpture by Joseph Durham, dates from 1867. There is also a plaster sculpture of the goddess Artemis by Hamo Thorneycroft, dating from 1880.

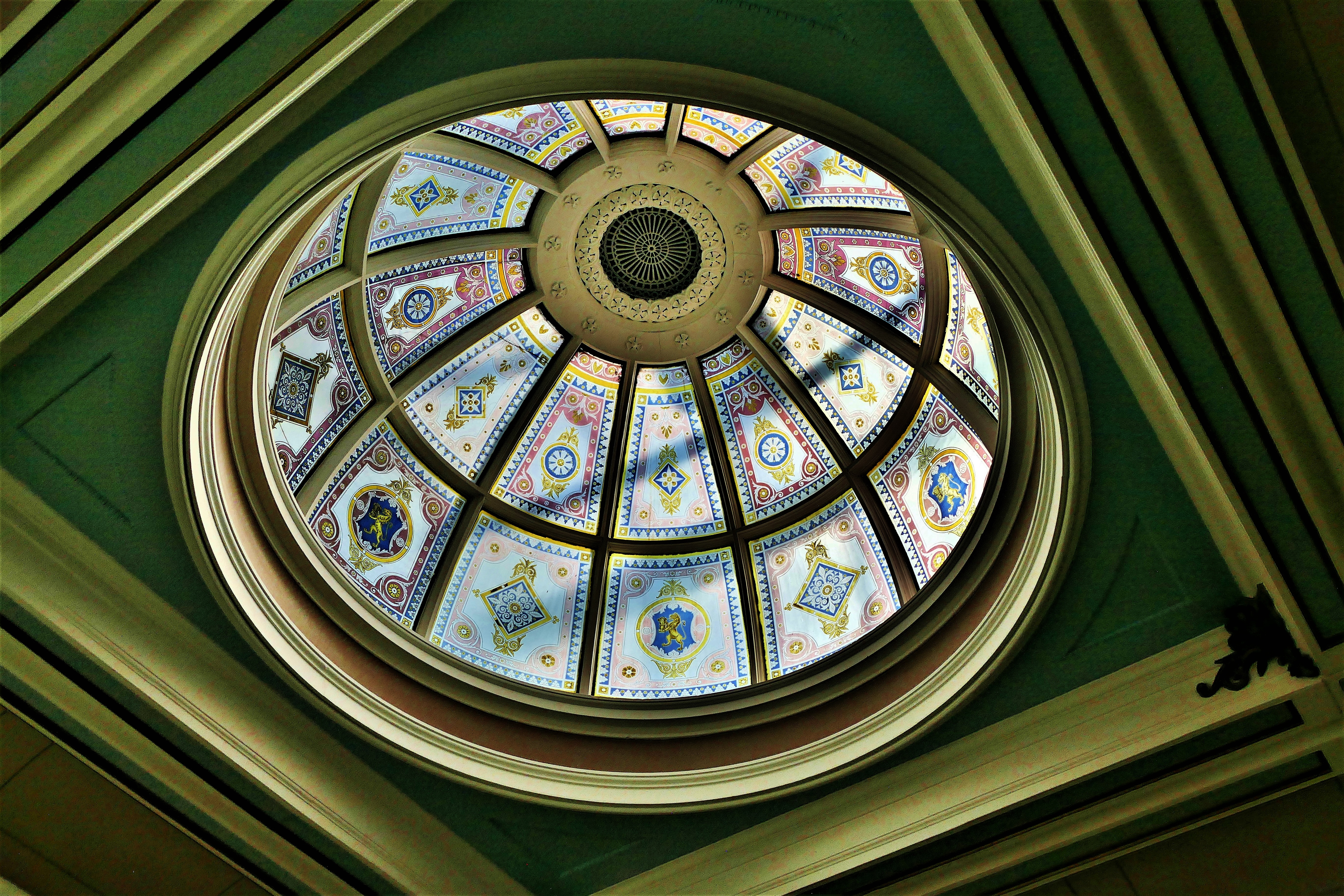
Painted glass lantern

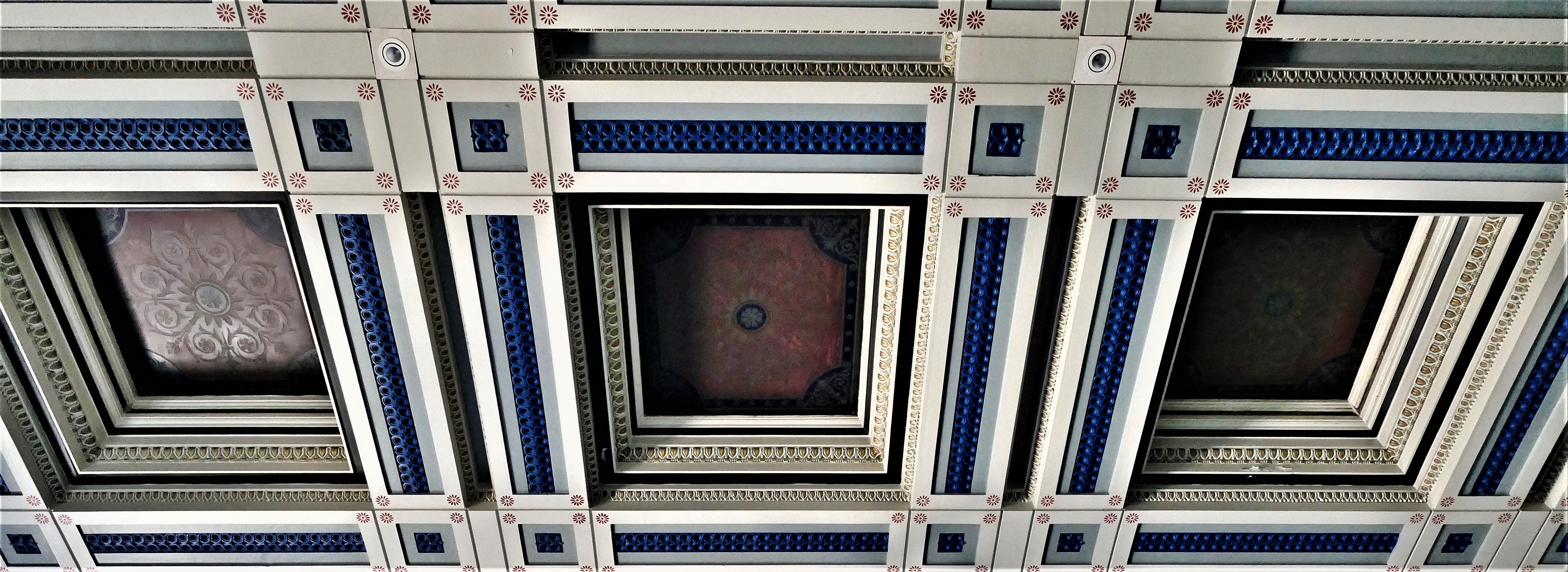
Detail of the Council Chamber coffered ceiling

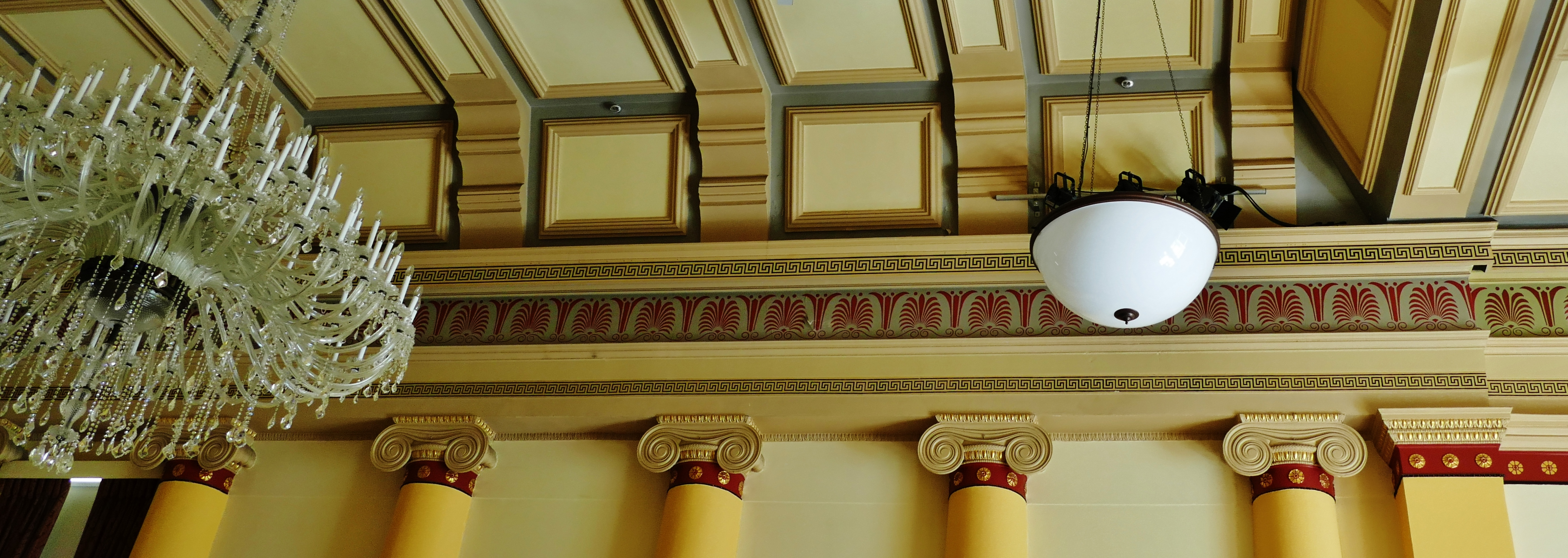
Detail of the Assembly Room ceiling and chandelier

== Modern usage ==
The 1990s extension houses council offices. The building's function rooms can be hired for meetings and events, and are licensed as a venue for civil weddings.

== See also ==
- Listed buildings in Macclesfield
