= St Paul's Church, Walsall =

Church of St Paul
- The Crossing at St Paul's
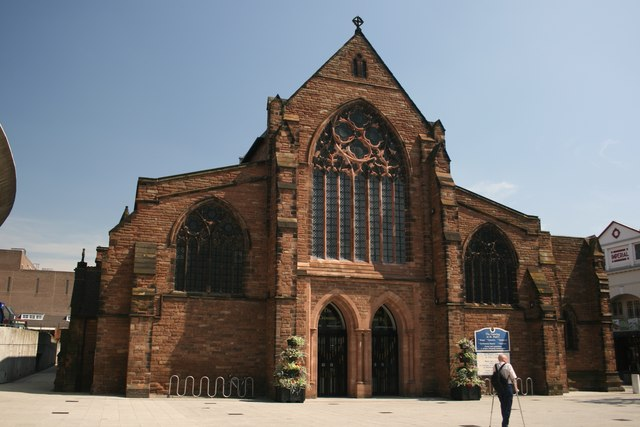
- Viewed from the south-west
- Church of St Paul
- 52°35′7.141″N 1°58′54.383″W
- OS grid reference: SP 01332 98612
- Location: Walsall, West Midlands
- Country: England
- Denomination: Church of England
- Website: www.thecrossingatstpauls.com

Architecture
- Heritage designation: Grade II
- Designated: 30 July 1986
- Architect: J. L. Pearson

Administration
- Diocese: Lichfield

St Paul's Church is an Anglican church in Walsall, West Midlands, England, and in the Diocese of Lichfield. The building is Grade II listed. It is the home of the company The Crossing at St Paul's.

== History and description ==
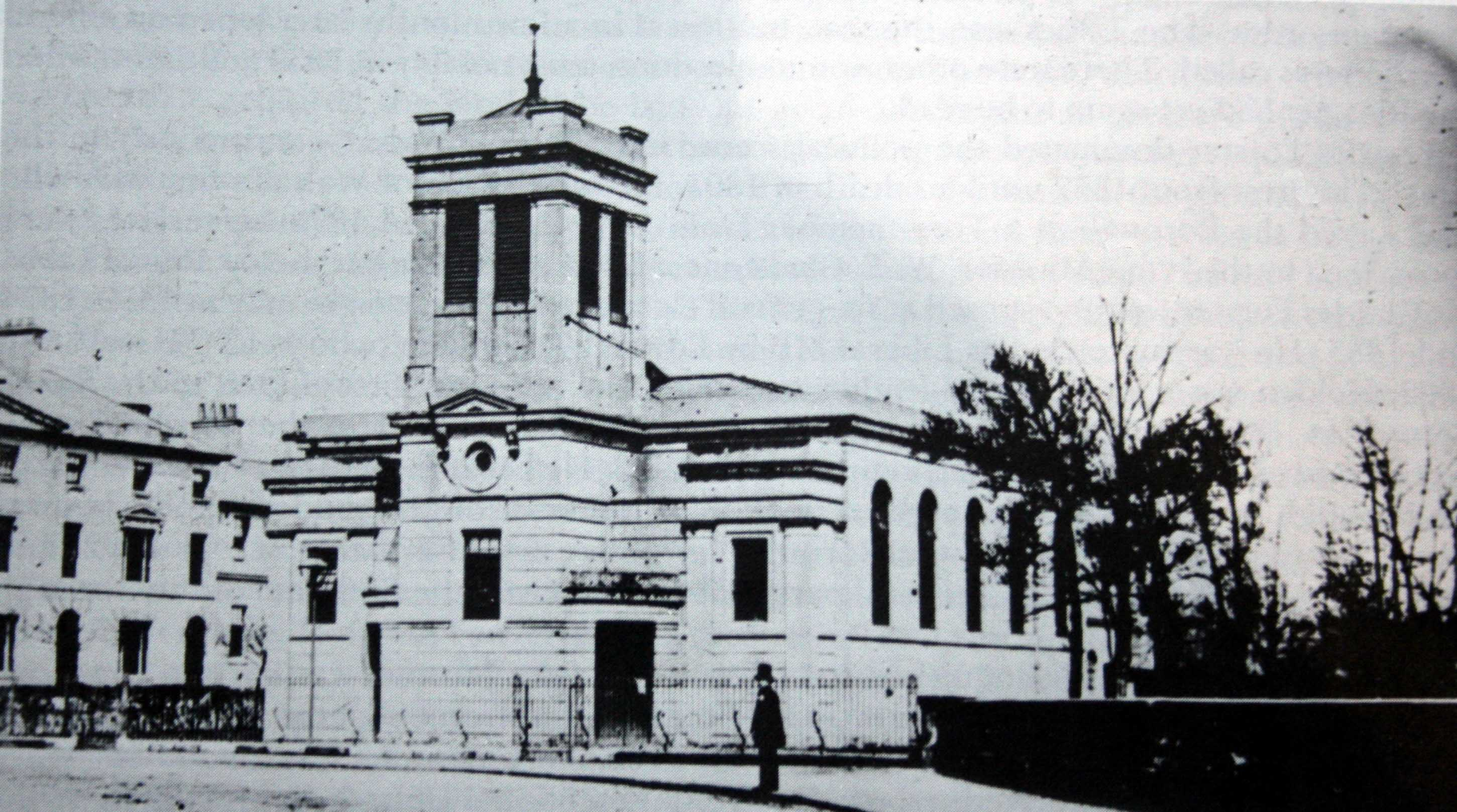
The original St Paul's, c. 1860

The original building, consecrated in 1826, was designed by Francis Goodwin in Greek Classical style, using stuccoed brick. It had a nave and a west tower: a chancel was added in 1852. It was built by the governors of Walsall Grammar School, for the use of the school and the public, and the minister was the headmaster of the school. The building was sold by the school in 1874 to the townspeople, and it was assigned a parish the following year, from the parishes of St Matthew and St Peter.

The church was rebuilt in 1892. It was designed by J. L. Pearson, in Decorated style, using Codsall sandstone. There is a nave with a clerestory and north and south aisles; there are shallow transepts to north and south. The west window has seven lights and tracery.

The church is the home of The Crossing at St Paul's Ltd, a company established to serve the community and put the Christian faith into practice. The company offers services including conference rooms to hire, a coffee shop and retail outlets.
