= St Thomas' Church, Henbury =

Coordinates: 53.2595°N 2.1792°W

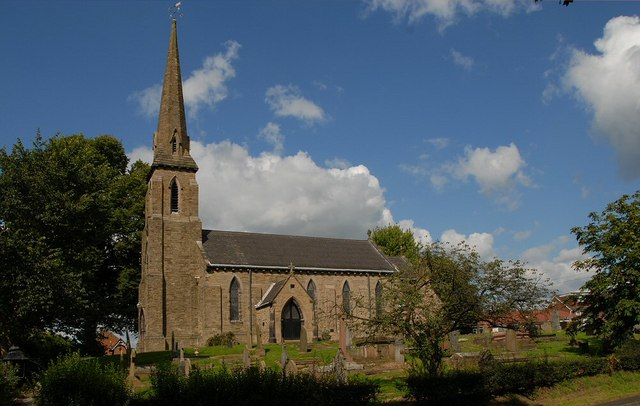
- St Thomas' Church, Henbury, from the south

- Location in Cheshire
- OS grid reference: SJ 881 736
- Location: Church Lane, Henbury, Cheshire
- Country: England
- Denomination: Anglican
- Churchmanship: Central churchmanship
- Website: St Thomas, Henbury

History
- Status: Parish church

Architecture
- Functional status: Active
- Heritage designation: Grade II
- Designated: 28 November 1984
- Architect: Richard Lane
- Architectural type: Church
- Style: Gothic Revival
- Groundbreaking: 1844
- Completed: c. 1870

Specifications
- Materials: Stone, tile roof

Administration
- Province: York
- Diocese: Chester
- Archdeaconry: Macclesfield
- Deanery: Macclesfield
- Parish: St Thomas, Henbury

Clergy
- Vicar: Revd William Gary Bowness

St Thomas' Church is in Church Lane in the village of Henbury, Cheshire, England. It is an active Anglican parish church in the deanery of Macclesfield, the archdeaconry of Macclesfield, and the diocese of Chester. The church is recorded in the National Heritage List for England as a designated Grade II listed building.

== History ==
The church was built in 1844–45, and designed by the Manchester architect Richard Lane. The chancel was added in about 1870.

== Architecture ==
=== Exterior ===
St Thomas' is constructed in stone with a tiled roof. Its plan consists of a five-bay nave, a chancel, a southeast vestry, and a west tower. The tower is in two stages with clasping buttresses, and is surmounted by an octagonal broach spire. The bottom stage of the tower contains a two-light window with Decorated tracery, above which is a clock face. In the top stage are louvred lancet bell openings. The spire contains lucarnes on alternate faces. In the angle between the tower and the west wall of the nave is a stair turret. The windows along the sides of the church are lancets. The east window has three lights, with two sexfoils and a cinquefoil at the apex. The south porch is gabled and extends from the second bay from the west.

=== Interior ===
Inside the church is a deeply chamfered chancel arch. A passage staircase leads from the chancel to the pulpit. There is a west gallery, carried on thin iron columns. The chancel is floored with Minton encaustic tiles and mosaic. All the stained glass dates from 1844. The monuments include two tablets dated 1869 by Matthew Noble, and a memorial dated 1888 by Harry Hems. The two-manual organ is situated in the west gallery. It was built in 1948 by Compton, and re-sited in 1985 by Oakes.

== External features ==
The lych gate standing at the northern entrance to the churchyard is also listed at Grade II. It is constructed in timber with a tile roof, and stands on a stone plinth. On the gable ends are decorated bargeboards. The churchyard contains the war graves of a soldier of World War I, and two of World War II.

== See also ==
- Listed buildings in Henbury, Cheshire
