= Richard Lane (architect) =

English architect

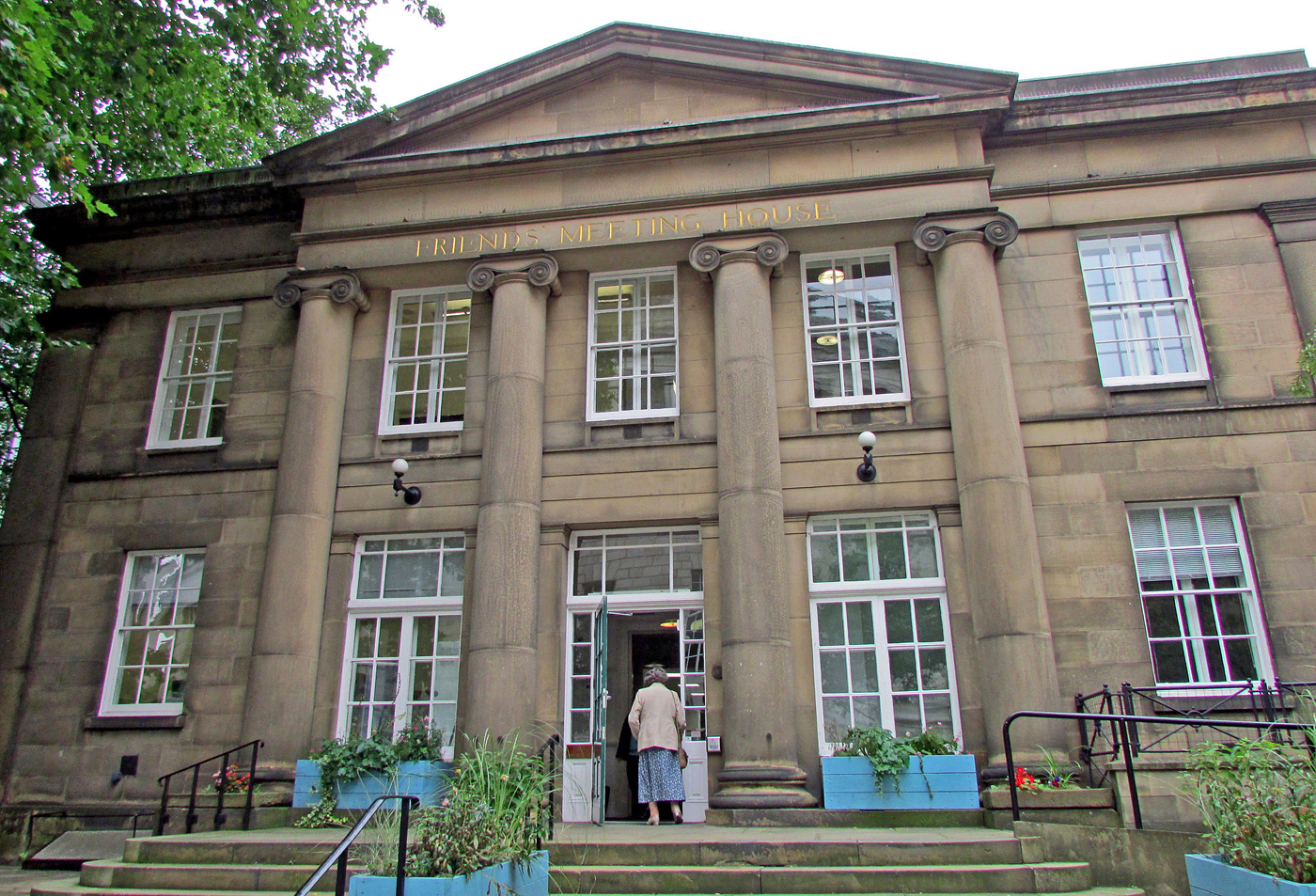
- Friends Meeting House, Manchester
- Born: 3 April 1795; London, England
- Died: 25 May 1880 (aged 85); Ascot, Berkshire, England
- Education: École des Beaux-Arts
- Occupation: Architect
- Practice: Richard Lane & Peter B. Alley
- Buildings: Old MRI Extension; Manchester Royal Lunatic Asylum
- Projects: Victoria Park, Manchester

Richard Lane (3 April 1795 – 25 May 1880) was an English architect of the early and mid-19th century. Born in London and based in Manchester, he was known mainly for his restrained and austere Greek-inspired classicism. He also designed a few buildings – mainly churches – in the Gothic style. He planned and designed many of the houses in the exclusive Victoria Park estate.

== Early life and education ==
Not much is known about Lane's early life, but he was born and educated in London, was a Quaker and in 1817 began studying at the famous École des Beaux-Arts in Paris. He was a pupil of the French architect Achille Leclère, who made a noted restoration of the Pantheon in 1813.

== Work and professional life ==
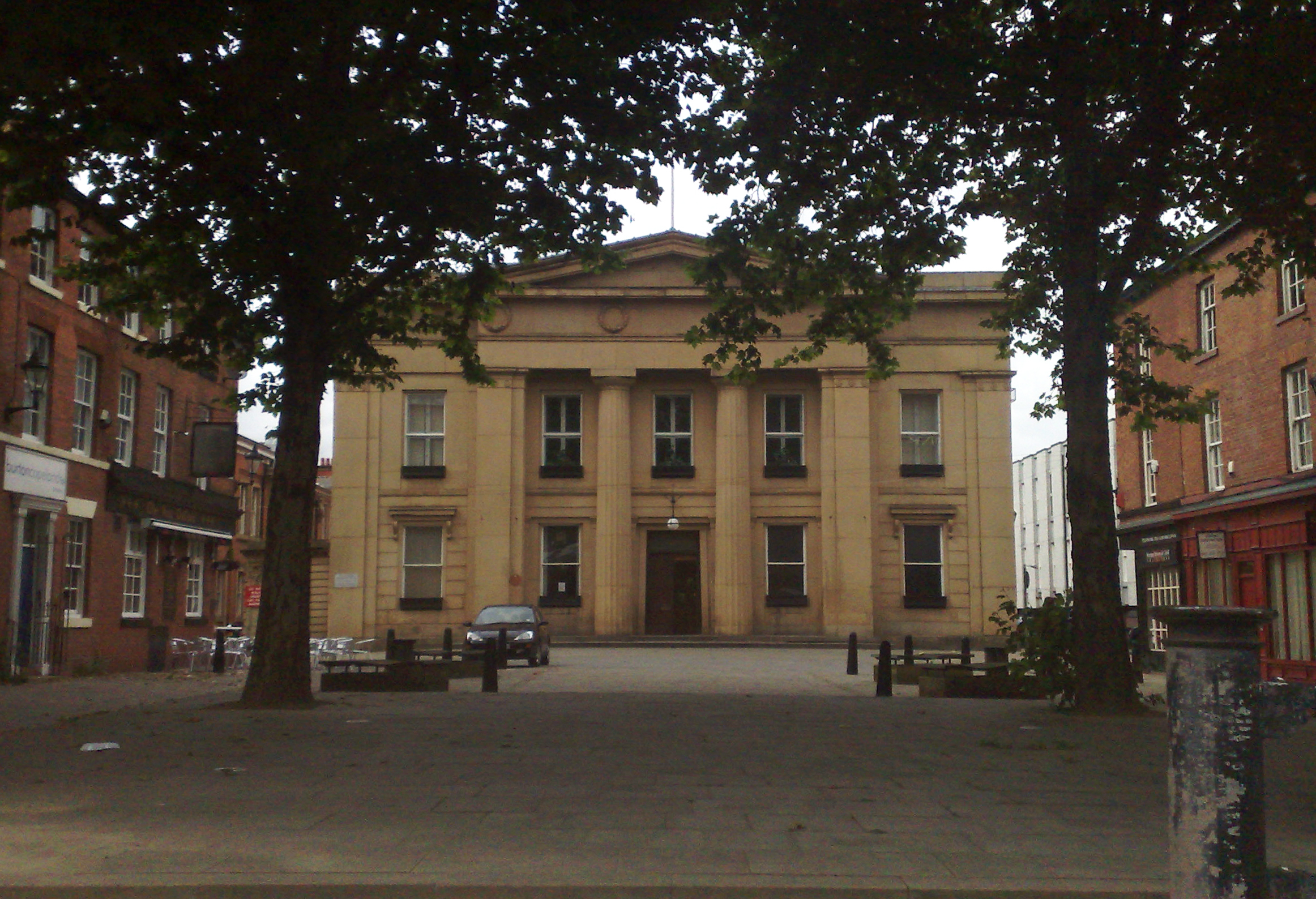
Salford Town Hall

After Paris, Lane moved to Manchester in 1821, was elected to membership of the Manchester Literary and Philosophical Society on 26 April 1822, set up practice and was appointed Land Surveyor to the Police Commissioners of Chorlton Row (as was). Much of Lane's work was on civic and governmental buildings, and he was commissioned to design a town hall just off Chapel Street for the Salford local government in 1825.

In 1830, the Chorlton Row Police Commissioners – essentially the administrative body of the Chorlton Row township – commissioned Lane to design a town hall on Cavendish Street. The Chorlton Town Hall was built by David Bellhouse; Lane and Bellhouse would later work together on other projects. Indeed, Lane had a close connection with the Bellhouse family, and transferred his share in the Portico Library to David Bellhouse's son, Edward Taylor Bellhouse, in 1834. The old town hall is now used by Manchester Metropolitan University.

Lane's notable ecclesiastical structures include the Royal Chapel of St John the Baptist, St John's, Isle of Man – built after Lane's design won an architectural competition set up by the church authorities – which is the national church of the Isle of Man, and functions as the seat of parliament for one day of the year; St George's Church, Chester Road (with Francis Goodwin); the Church of St Mary with St Peter, Church Street, Oldham; and appropriately, the Friends' Meeting House, Mount Street, Manchester.

Lane was one of the defendant architects in the landmark case Foss v Harbottle (1843) 67 ER 189, which established the precedent that where a wrong is alleged to have been done to a company, the proper claimant is the company itself.

=== Manchester Architectural Society ===
By the 1830s, Lane was Manchester's most prominent architect and in 1837, was one of the founders – and the first president – of the Manchester Architectural Society, the city's first architectural learned society.

== Students ==
A number of distinguished students were apprenticed to the practice of Richard Lane and Peter B. Alley, most notably Alfred Waterhouse, a fellow Quaker who was articled to the practice in 1845. Other distinguished students to complete articles under Lane include the architect, archaeologist, and writer Richard Popplewell Pullan; and the theatre architect, amateur actor, writer, and a former vice-president of the Royal Institute of British Architects Alfred Darbyshire, who developed what was known as the 'Irving-Darbyshire Safety Theatre' with his friend the actor Henry Irving.

== Later life ==
Lane died in Ascot, Berkshire, on 25 May 1880, at the age of 85.

== Notable projects ==
=== Ecclesiastical ===
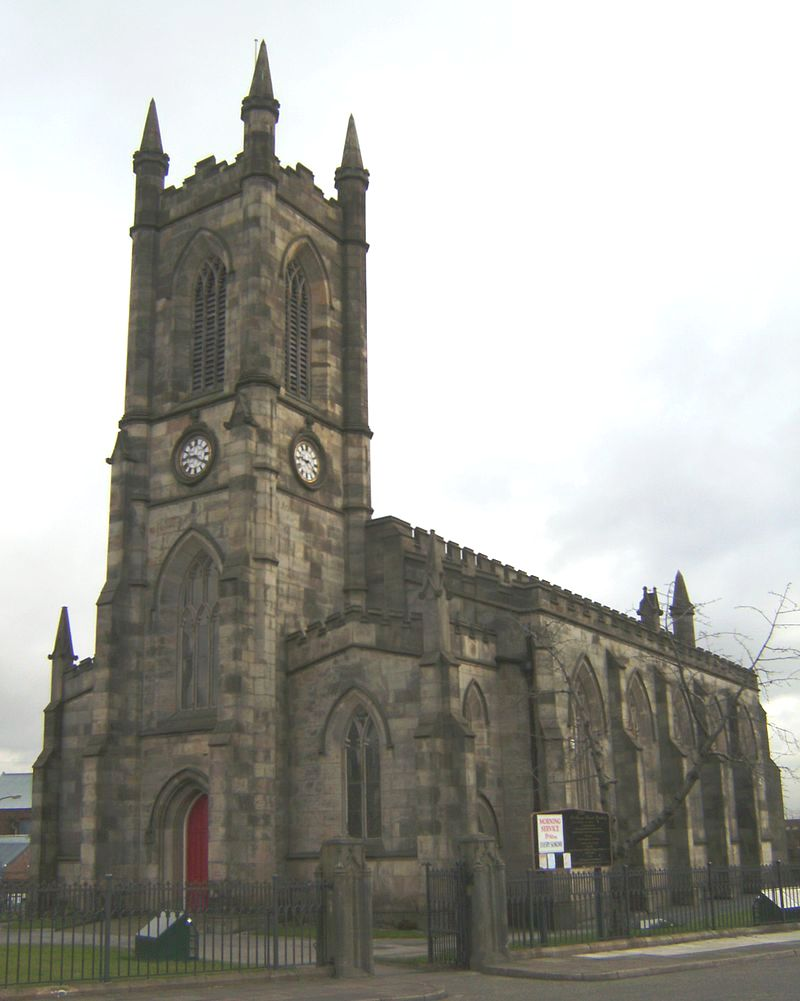
Church of St Thomas, Pendleton

- Royal Chapel of St John the Baptist – St John's, Isle of Man (1847–1849. The national church of the Isle of Man and functions as the seat of parliament for one day of the year.)
- Church of St Mary with St Peter – Church Street, Oldham (1827–1830. Grade II* listed. Chosen in favour of a rival design by Sir Charles Barry.)
- Church of St Thomas – Church Lane, Henbury (1844–1845. Grade II listed.)
- Church of St George (1826–1828. Grade II* listed. Designed with Francis Goodwin. Now converted into apartments.)
- Church of St Thomas – Broad Street, Pendleton, Salford (1829–1831. Grade II listed. Designed with Francis Goodwin.)
- Church of St John the Evangelist – Murray Street, Broughton, Salford (1836–1839. Grade II listed.)
- Friends' Meeting House – Mount Street, Manchester (1828–1830. Grade II listed.)

=== Governmental and civic ===
- Salford Town Hall – Bexley Square, Salford (1825–1827. Grade II listed. Formerly housing Salford Magistrates' Court, the building was sold and redeveloped as flats c. 2010.)
- Chorlton-on-Medlock Town Hall – Cavendish Street, Manchester (1830–1831. Grade II listed. Only the façade remains of the original building. Now the refectory of Manchester Metropolitan University.)
- Great Bolton Exchange and Library – Victoria Square, Bolton (1825–1829. Grade II listed. Has been a museum of natural history and is now offices and a branch of the Nationwide Building Society.)

=== Hospitals ===
- Manchester Royal Infirmary refacing and extension – on what is now Piccadilly Gardens (1834. Demolished in 1914 to make way for the gardens.)
- Manchester Royal Lunatic Asylum – Wilmslow Road, Cheadle Hulme (1848–1849. Grade II listed. Still a psychiatric hospital, renamed as Cheadle Royal Hospital. It is an important early example of the Victorian asylum system, designed in the Elizabethan style.)
- Stockport Infirmary – Wellington Road South, Stockport (1832. Grade II listed)

=== Educational ===
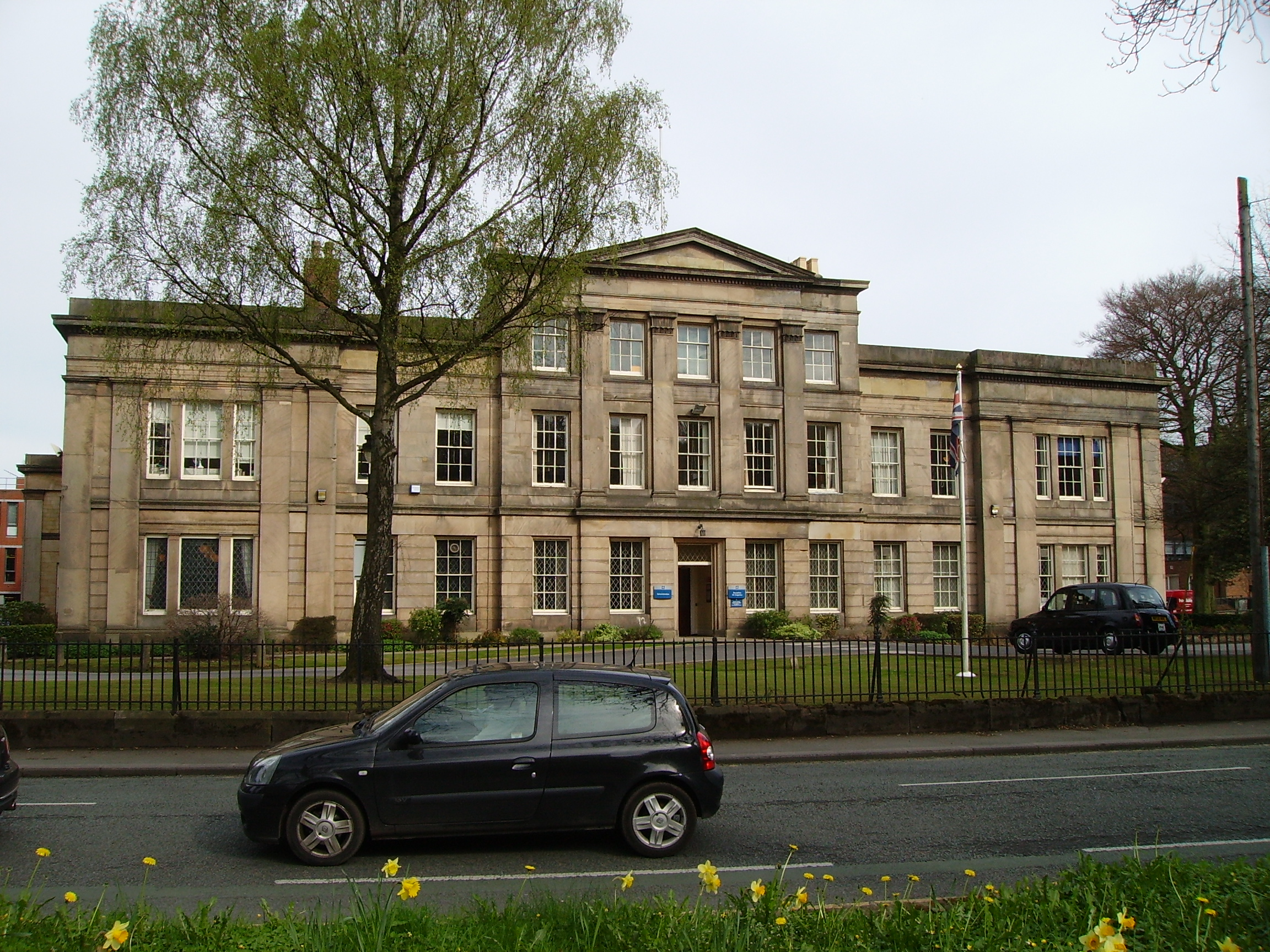
Didsbury College of Education

- Wesleyan Theological College – Wilmslow Road, Didsbury, Manchester. (1842. Grade II* listed. Now the Didsbury School of Education – the school of education of Manchester Metropolitan University.)
- Queen Elizabeth Grammar School – Wakefield (1833–1834. Grade II listed.)
- Henshaw's Bluecoat School – Egerton Street, Oldham (1829–1834. Grade II listed.)
- Henshaw's Blind Asylum – Stretford Road, Old Trafford (1837. Demolished in 1972 to make way for Greater Manchester Police's headquarters.)

=== Residential ===
- Victoria Park estate – Rusholme, Manchester (1830s 'gated community'. Lane laid out the roads and sewers and designed many of the residences. The area is still residential, but all of the mansions have now been converted to hotels, educational establishments and nursing homes.)
- Bowden Hall – Bowden Lane, Chapel-en-le-Frith (1844. Grade II listed. A country hall.)

== See also ==
- Foss v Harbottle
