= Henbury, Cheshire =

Village in Cheshire, England

Coordinates: 53.260°N 2.180°W

Henbury
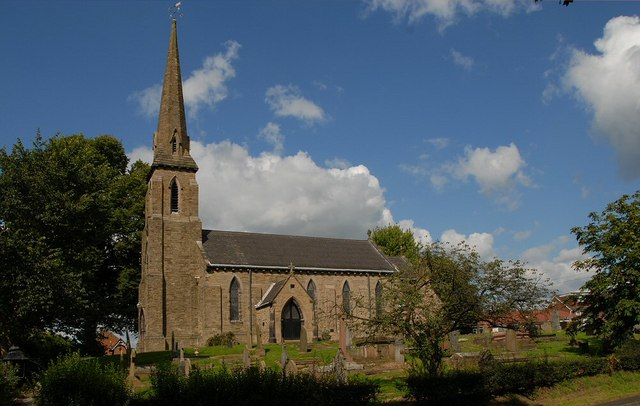
- St. Thomas' Church, Henbury

- Location within Cheshire
- Population: 594
- OS grid reference: SJ8873
- Civil parish: Henbury
- Unitary authority: Cheshire East
- Ceremonial county: Cheshire
- Region: North West
- Country: England
- Sovereign state: United Kingdom
- Post town: MACCLESFIELD
- Postcode district: SK10, SK11
- Dialling code: 01625
- Police: Cheshire
- Fire: Cheshire
- Ambulance: North West
- UK Parliament: Macclesfield

Henbury is a village and civil parish in the unitary authority of Cheshire East and the ceremonial county of Cheshire, England. According to the 2001 census, the entire civil parish had a population of 594. The village is 3.8 miles (6.1 km) west of Macclesfield on the A537.

Henbury became a civil parish in 1845. It has an Anglican church, the Church of St Thomas, two pubs, and a grocery.

The village hall hosts a number of functions throughout the year with an active social committee. There is also a Millennium Green in Henbury.

== See also ==
- Listed buildings in Henbury, Cheshire
- Henbury Hall, Cheshire
