= Church of St George, Hulme =

Former church building in Manchester, England

Church of St George
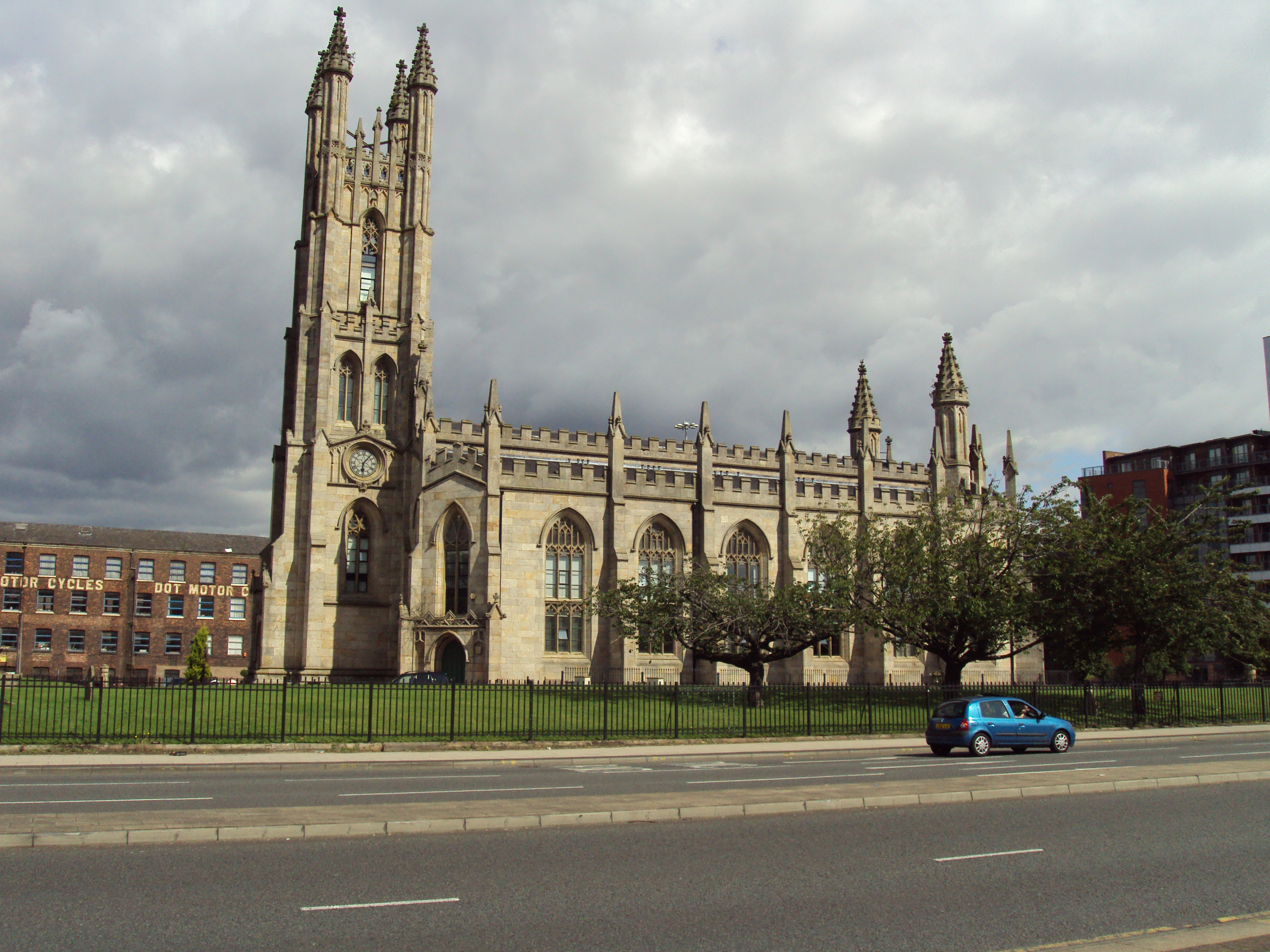
- Church of St George, Chester Road, Hulme

Location
- Location: Chester Road, Hulme, Manchester
- Interactive map of Church of St George
- Coordinates: 53.4721°N 2.2593°W

Architecture
- Architect: Francis Goodwin
- Groundbreaking: 1826
- Completed: 1828
- Construction cost: £15,000

The Church of St George, Chester Road, Hulme, Manchester, is an early Gothic Revival church by Francis Goodwin, built in 1826–1828. It was restored in 1884 by J. S. Crowther. It was designated a Grade II* listed building on 3 October 1974.

The church was a Commissioners' church, (built to celebrate the victory at the Battle of Waterloo) allotted the sum of £15,000 for construction. Goodwin was an obvious choice for architects having already undertaken a number of churches in the Midlands and the North West, as well as the original Manchester Town Hall. Sir Nikolaus Pevsner considers that Goodwin's inspiration was Nicholas Hawksmoor's St Michael, Cornhill and that "the whole makes a lively and memorable picture". A six-bay nave with "high three-light Perpendicular windows" concludes with a tall tower at the west end, and two high pinnacles at the east. Porches are set at the northwest and southwest corners.

Drawing from Pevsner, the English Heritage inspectors who listed the building in 1974, without an internal inspection, stated that the interior was "reported as having: galleries; Perpendicular arcades; [and a] wall monument to The Hon. George Berkeley Molyneux (d.1841), by Edward Physick, in form of soldier mourning beside urn."

A declining inner-city population in the post-war period, combined with the increasing isolation of the church caused by major road construction in its vicinity, led to St George's closure in 1984. The last Rector Revd Derek Seber worked with Brian Redhead to try to find a long term use for the building including as a museum for Rolls-Royce and as a Museum of Sport . The transformation into such was planned under the then governments Community Programme which offered training in conservation and building skills. A change in policy brought this initiative to an end. There followed a "twenty-year search for a use which would preserve the interior … proved fruitless and the building was converted to flats (in) 2000–2. The interior can no longer be read as a whole." In 2015, the flat occupying the church tower was on the market for £1 million.

== See also ==
- Grade II* listed buildings in Greater Manchester
- Listed buildings in Manchester-M15
- List of churches in Greater Manchester
- List of works by Francis Goodwin
- List of works by J. S. Crowther
- List of churches dedicated to St. George
