= Commissioners' church =

Type of C19 Anglican church in the UK

Church Building Act 1818 (Note: The citation of this act by this short title was authorised by section 1 of, and the first schedule to, the Short Titles Act 1896. Due to the repeal of those provisions it is now authorised by section 19(2) of the Interpretation Act 1978.)
- Act of Parliament
- Parliament of the United Kingdom
- Long title: An Act for building and promoting the building of additional Churches in populous Parishes.
- Citation: 58 Geo. 3. c. 45
- Territorial extent: United Kingdom

Dates
- Royal assent: 30 May 1818
- Commencement: 30 May 1818 (Note: The Acts of Parliament (Commencement) Act 1793.)
- Repealed: 27 June 1974
Other legislation
Amended by	Church Building Act 1819; Church Building Act 1822; Church Building Act 1824; Post Office (Repeal of Laws) Act 1837; Statute Law Revision Act 1873; Statute Law Revision Act 1888; Statute Law Revision Act 1890; Public Authorities Protection Act 1893
Repealed by	Statute Law (Repeals) Act 1974

Status: Repealed

Text of statute as originally enacted

Church Building Act 1819
- Act of Parliament
- Parliament of the United Kingdom
- Long title: An Act to amend and render more effectual an Act passed in the last Session of Parliament, for building and promoting the building of additional Churches in populous Parishes.
- Citation: 59 Geo. 3. c. 134
- Territorial extent: United Kingdom

Dates
- Royal assent: 13 July 1819
- Commencement: 13 July 1819
- Repealed: 27 June 1974
Other legislation
Amends	Church Building Act 1818
Amended by	Church Building Act 1822; Church Building Act 1824; Church Building Act 1832; Statute Law Revision Act 1888; Statute Law Revision Act 1890
Repealed by	Statute Law (Repeals) Act 1974

Status: Repealed

Text of statute as originally enacted

Church Building Act 1822
- Act of Parliament
- Parliament of the United Kingdom
- Long title: An Act to amend and render more effectual Two Acts, passed in the Fifty-eighth and Fifty-ninth Years of His late Majesty, for building and promoting the building of additional Churches in populous Parishes.
- Citation: 3 Geo. 4. c. 72
- Territorial extent: United Kingdom

Dates
- Royal assent: 22 July 1822
- Commencement: 22 July 1822
- Repealed: 1 July 2018 (Note: The Statute Law (Repeals) Measure 2018 (Commencement) Order 2018 (SI 2018/718).)
Other legislation
Amends	Church Building Act 1818; Church Building Act 1819
Amended by	Church Building Act 1824; Statute Law Revision Act 1873; Statute Law Revision Act 1874; Statute Law Revision Act 1888; New Parishes Measure 1943; Statute Law (Repeals) Act 1974
Repealed by	Statute Law (Repeals) Measure 2018

Status: Repealed

Text of statute as originally enacted

Revised text of statute as amended

Text of the Church Building Act 1822 as in force today (including any amendments) within the United Kingdom, from legislation.gov.uk.

Church Building Act 1824
- Act of Parliament
- Parliament of the United Kingdom
- Long title: An Act to make further provision, and to amend and render more effectual Three Acts passed in the Fifty-eighth and Fifty-ninth Years of His late Majesty, and in the Third Year of His present Majesty, for building and promoting the building of additional Churches in populous Parishes.
- Citation: 5 Geo. 4. c. 103
- Territorial extent: United Kingdom

Dates
- Royal assent: 24 June 1824
- Commencement: 24 June 1824
- Repealed: 27 June 1974
Other legislation
Amends	Church Building Act 1818; Church Building Act 1819; Church Building Act 1822
Amended by	Statute Law Revision Act 1873
Repealed by	Statute Law (Repeals) Act 1974

Status: Repealed

Text of statute as originally enacted

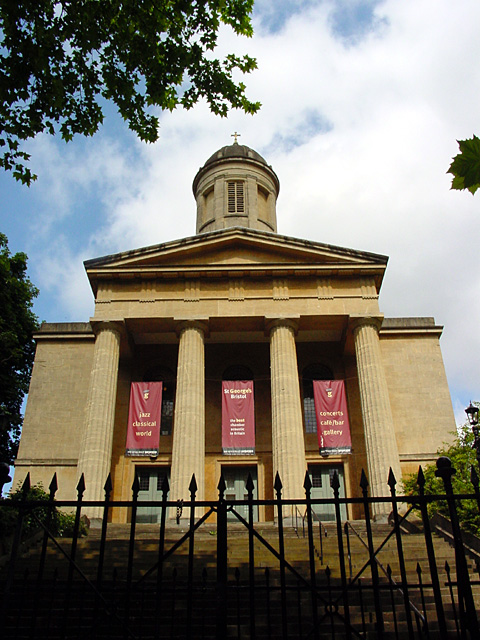
St George's Church, Brandon Hill, a Commissioners' church in a Neoclassical style by Robert Smirke

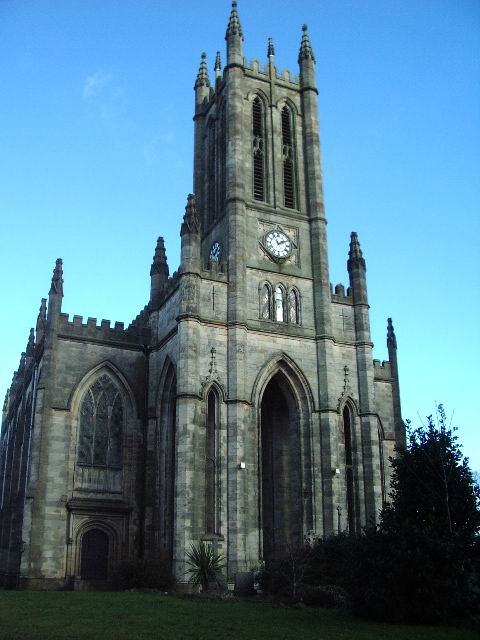
All Saints' Church, Stand, by Charles Barry in a Gothic Revival style with Early English elements

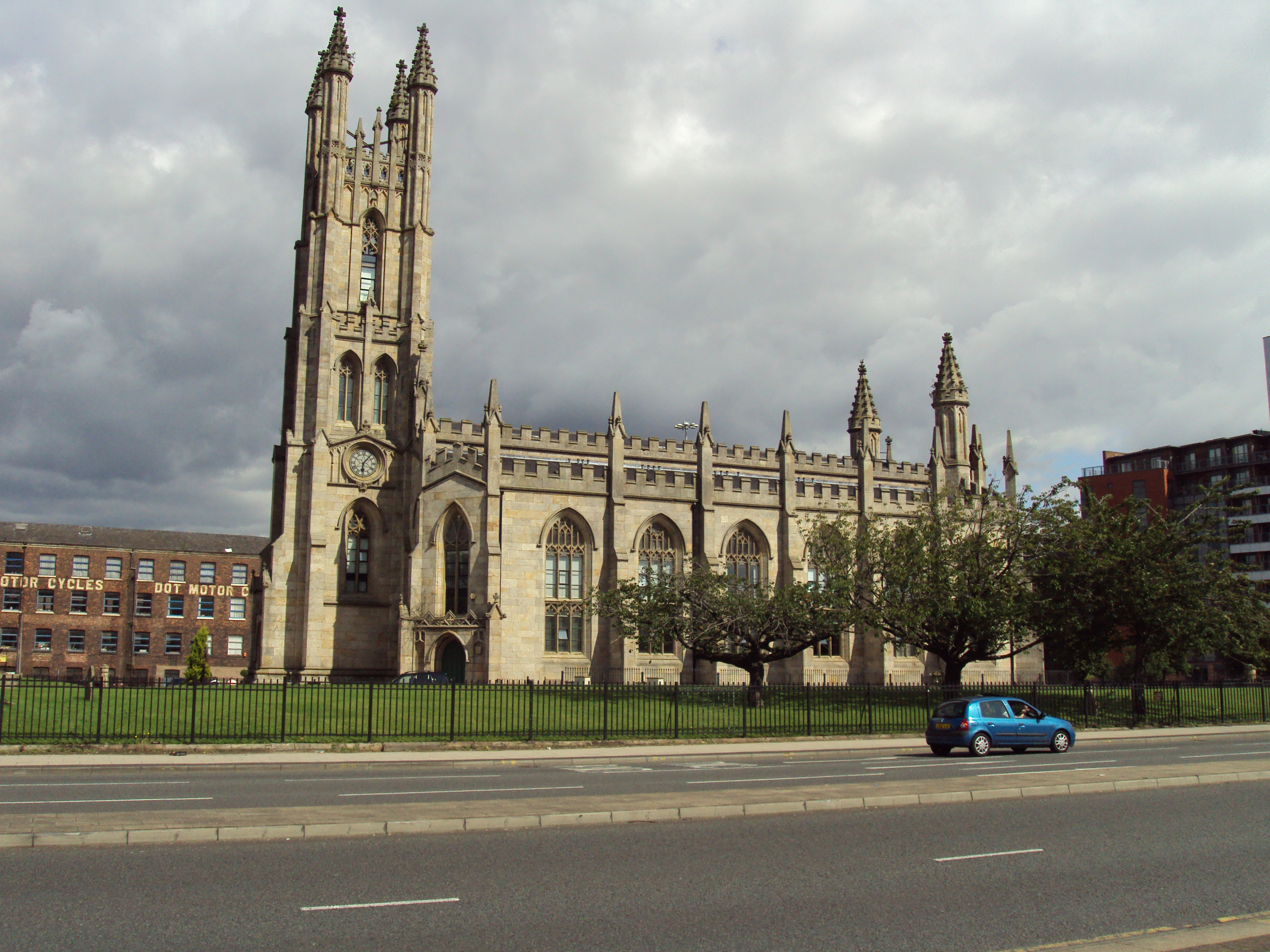
Church of St George, Chester Road, Hulme, by Francis Goodwin in a Gothic Revival style with Perpendicular elements

A Commissioners' church, also known as a Waterloo church and Million Act church, is an Anglican church in England or Wales built with money voted by Parliament as a result of the Church Building Act 1818 (58 Geo. 3. c. 45) and the Church Building Act 1824 (5 Geo. 4. c. 103). The 1818 act supplied a grant of money and established the Church Building Commission to direct its use, and in 1824 made a further grant of money. In addition to paying for the building of churches, the Commission had powers to divide and subdivide parishes, and to provide endowments. The Commission continued to function as a separate body until the end of 1856, when it was absorbed into the Ecclesiastical Commission. In some cases the Commissioners provided the full cost of the new church; in other cases they provided a partial grant and the balance was raised locally. In total 612 new churches were provided, mainly in expanding industrial towns and cities.

== Title ==
The First Parliamentary Grant for churches amounted to £1 million (equivalent to £74,070,000 in 2025), which is why the 1818 act that provided for it is sometimes referred to in scholarly literature as the Million Pound Act.

The Second Parliamentary Grant of 1824 amounted to an additional £500,000 (£47,460,000 in 2025), so the term "million" cannot apply to all the churches aided by the Commission. The Commission was founded on a wave of national triumph following the defeat of Napoleon at the Battle of Waterloo in 1815; hence the suggestion of the word "Waterloo" in the title. But even if this were a factor in founding the Commission, again it could only apply to the earlier phases of building. The term "Commissioners' church" covers the whole of the work of the Church Building Commission and it is the term normally used by architectural historians, including M. H. Port in 600 New Churches, and the authors of the Pevsner Architectural Guides.

== Background ==
Towards the end of the 18th century the Church of England was facing a number of problems and challenges. Due to factors including the Industrial Revolution, the population of Britain had grown, and it had redistributed, tending to concentrate in urban centres: some older and expanded, others newly created. Meanwhile, the organisation of the Church of England had not been modified to reflect this change, leading to a mismatch between the population and the pastoral services provided by the church. For example, Stockport with a population of nearly 34,000 had church seating for only 2,500, Sheffield had 6,280 seats for 55,000 people, Manchester had 11,000 for nearly 80,000, and the St Marylebone district of London had only 8,700 places for 76,624 inhabitants. In addition, there was a concern in society that, following the French Revolution of 1789–99, there might be a similar uprising in Britain. It was considered that "the influence of the Church and its religious and moral teaching was a bulwark against revolution." Some argued that a major function of the church was to complement the work of the state; that "the church's main function was social control". On top of this, the Church of England had its own internal problems, some of them even amounting to abuses, such as pluralism (vicars owning more than one benefice), absenteeism (vicars employing curates to run their parishes) and non-residence. There was a great disparity between the incomes of the parochial clergy. The educational level of the clergy and their training was often inadequate. Challenges to the church came from two main sources, dissent and secularism. Dissenters were those Christians who did not ascribe to the practices of the established church (the Church of England), and they included the older independent churches such as the Quakers, Baptists and Congregationalists, and the newer movement of Methodism. The rise of these movements was blamed partly on the lack of accommodation in the churches provided by the state church.

A major impediment to increasing the number of churches in the newly expanded towns was the difficulty in providing a regular income for an incumbent parson. Most parish livings in the Church of England were then primarily supported from agricultural tithes collected from farms in the parish. In expanding towns and cities, new churches had tended to be provided in association with residential developments as proprietary chapels, whose licensed ministers received an income from pew rents. Neither method of finance had proved capable of funding the provision of clergy for poorer urban populations.

During the early 1810s groups were formed to address these problems by both active parties in the Church of England, the Evangelicals and the High Churchmen. Joshua Watson, a layman, was a prominent member of the High Church group; he has been described as "the greatest lay churchman of his day" and was to become "the cornerstone of the [Church Building] Commission", on which he served for 33 years. Because of the legal structure of the Church of England, it was "almost indispensable to obtain an Act of Parliament before a church was rebuilt, or a new one built " and "to divide a parish an Act was essential". There was growing pressure for Parliament to meet the problems. Following the defeat of Napoleon in 1815 there was also a movement to build churches "as a "national thank-offering". In December 1815 Joshua Watson and the pamphleteer John Bowdler, wrote a "memorial" to the prime minister, Lord Liverpool, arguing the case for more churches. There was initial reluctance from the politicians to agree to the proposal, partly because of the financial deficit following the Napoleonic Wars. In 1817 a committee was appointed to form a society for "promoting public worship by obtaining additional church-room for the middle and lower classes". This was successful and at a public meeting on 6 February 1818 in the Freemasons' Hall, London, chaired by Charles Manners-Sutton, the Archbishop of Canterbury, the Duke of Northumberland proposed a motion to form the Church Building Society, and this was accepted. This led to Parliament's agreement to provide the First Parliamentary Grant of £1 million for building new churches. The Church Building Act 1818 (58 Geo. 3. c. 45) was debated in Parliament and passed later that year.

== The commission ==
The first commission consisted of 34 members, both clergy and laity being represented. In addition to providing grants of money, the commission had powers to divide and subdivide parishes and to provide endowments.

The Commission appointed George Jenner as its secretary, and then had to decide how to apportion its funds. It set its maximum sum for a grant at £20,000 (equivalent to £1,480,000 in 2025) each, but this would have built only 50 churches. A degree of economy was necessary, but it was considered that the churches should be recognisable as those of the Church of England, with a tower and even a spire. Thomas Rickman was appointed to prepare plans in the diocese of Chester. Applicants for grants had to abide by rules drawn up by the commission. The designs for the churches were to be decided by competition, but the churches had to be soundly built. In some cases the commission provided the whole cost of the building. On occasions this exceeded the cost of the building and also included the cost of the site and legal charges. Often the grant was less than the cost of the building, the difference being met by private donations and public subscription. In no case was the recommended ceiling of £20,000 exceeded. The highest grant was of £19,948 for St Martin's Church in Liverpool. Designs for churches funded in the first grant in London were mainly classical in style; but outside London most commissioners' churches conformed to a characteristic late Georgian Gothic Revival style, with little concern for accurate reproduction of medieval Gothic features. It was common for architects to re-use designs on a number of sites; perhaps varying the window tracery to conform with one or another different period of English Gothic architecture. A few architects - notably Thomas Rickman, Frances Goodwin and Robert Smirke won a large number of commissions.

Plans of churches to be funded had to be approved by the commission; and their stipulations conformed to the 'High Church' principles of the day, representing a decisive moving away from the 'preaching box' principles that had governed much Georgian church and chapel architecture. The commission were determined the new churches should instead give appropriate architectural expression to the rites of Holy Communion and Baptism; and that these sacraments should not be visually subordinated to pulpit preaching. Hence, the commission insisted that the communion table should be set apart in a shallow eastern apse or sanctuary behind a communion rail; and raised on three steps so as to be visible from all seats in the church. Larger churches should have galleries along the sides and west end, to provide the required seating capacity; the largest Commissioners Churches could seat a nominal congregation of 2,000. Except in the side galleries, all seats should face (ritual) east. The baptismal font should be at the west end of the church, accommodated within a christening pew. The pulpit and parson's reading desk were normally to be set at the east end of the church, on either side of the sanctuary. The commission would not approve plans where services were to be led by parson and parish clerk from a centrally located triple-decker pulpit, although a number of incumbents subsequently arranged for the pulpit to be moved into the central aisle, with or without the approval of the commission. Pews in the body of the nave were expected to be subject to pew rents but the commission insisted that a substantial proportion of seating, in the galleries and on benches in the aisles, should be free. Nevertheless within two decades, these design principles had been overtaken by the widespread adoption of 'ecclesiological' ideals in church design, as promoted by the Cambridge Camden Society; so that mid-Victorian High Churchmen routinely deprecated the original liturgical arrangements of Commissioners Churches, commonly seeking to rearrange their eastern bays with a ritual choir and chancel on ecclesiological principles.

By February 1821, 85 churches had been provided with seating for 144,190. But only £88,000 (equivalent to £8,350,000 in 2025) of the original £1 million remained. Applications for 25 more churches had to be postponed and it was clear that more money would be needed from Parliament. Fortuitously in 1824 the Austrian government repaid a £2 million war loan that the British Treasury had written-off within the national accounts, creating an unexpected windfall that could be applied for the purpose. This led to the Church Building Act 1824 (5 Geo. 4. c. 103) that provided the Second Parliamentary Grant of £500,000 (equivalent to £47,460,000 in 2025). This money was distributed much more widely and, on the whole the grants supported a smaller proportion of total building costs. The First Parliamentary Grant was shared between fewer than 100 churches; the Second Parliamentary Grant went to more than 500 churches. The highest grant in this second phase was of £10,686 to All Saints Church, Skinner Street in the City of London, but this was exceptional. Most second-phase grants were between £100 and £1,000; on some occasions the grant was a mere £5. The Church Building Commission continued to function until 1 January 1857, when it was absorbed into the Ecclesiastical Commission.

== List of churches ==
- List of Commissioners' churches in eastern England
- List of Commissioners' churches in the English Midlands
- List of Commissioners' churches in London
- List of Commissioners' churches in Northeast and Northwest England
- List of Commissioners' churches in southwest England
- List of Commissioners' churches in Wales
- List of Commissioners' churches in Yorkshire

== See also ==
- Victorian restoration
- Church Building Act

== Bibliography ==
- Parsons, Gerald (1988), "Reform, Revival and Realignment: The Experience of Victoria Anglicanism", in Parsons, Gerald (ed.), Religion in Victorian Britain, vol. I: Traditions, Manchester: Manchester University Press, ISBN 0-7190-2511-7
- Port, M. H. (2006), 600 New Churches: the Church Building Commission 1818-1856 (2nd ed.), Reading: Spire Books, ISBN 978-1-904965-08-4
