= Francis Goodwin (architect) =

English architect

- Born: 23 May 1784; Kings Lynn, Norfolk, England
- Died: 30 August 1835 (aged 51) near Portman Square, London
- Resting place: Kensal Green Cemetery
- Occupation: Architect

Francis Goodwin (23 May 1784 – 30 August 1835) was an English architect.

== Biography ==
He was born in Kings Lynn, Norfolk, the eldest son of William Goodwin, who was a carpenter. He was trained as an architect by J. Coxedge in Kensington, London. In 1806, he exhibited a view of a chapel in Kings Lynn at the Royal Academy. He married twice, in 1808 to Mary Stort, and in 1818 to Elizabeth Reynolds. From the marriages he had at least five sons.

Goodwin started his architectural career with work on two churches in Kings Lynn, His big opportunity came with the passing of the Church Building Act 1818 which granted £1 million (equivalent to £84 million in 2023) for the building of what became known as Commissioners' churches. Nine of the churches he designed for the commissioners were accepted and completed. He designed new churches for other clients, and also rebuilt or remodelled churches. Goodwin received commissions for civic buildings, in particular town halls for Manchester and Macclesfield, markets for Leeds and Salford, and for Derby Gaol. Most of the designs for churches were in Gothic Revival style, while those for the civic buildings were mainly Neoclassical. Later in his career he became involved with domestic architecture, in particular in designing Lissadell House in County Sligo, Ireland, for Sir Robert Gore-Booth. In 1833, Goodwin self-published his work entitled Domestic Architecture, being a Series of Designs for Mansions, Villas, Rectory Houses, Parsonage Houses, Bailiffs’ Lodge, Gardener’s Lodge, Game-keeper’s Lodge, Park Gate Lodge etc. in the Grecian, Italian and Old English style of Architecture with Observations on the Appropriate Choice of Site; the Whole Designed with Strict Reference to the Practicability of Erection, And with Due Attention to the Important Consideration of Uniting Elegance, Convenience and Domestic Comfort with Economy; the Whole Being the Result of Upwards of Thirty Years Professional Experience with Accurate Estimates Appended to Each Design.

In 1830, Goodwin prepared and published a Classical design for a ‘Grand National Cemetery’ to be laid out probably at Primrose Hill ‘intended for the prevention of the Danger and Inconvenience of Burying the Dead within the Metropolis: Proposed to be erected by a Capital of 400,000 [£] in 16,000 shares at 25 [£]. each’. A copy of the prospectus is in the Guildhall Library. The Grand National Cemetery was not completed.

Goodwin worked from an office near Bedford Square, London. According to the Oxford Dictionary of National Biography, he used highly competitive measures to acquire commissions, and used employees to "chase commissions" in the Midlands and northern England using "the stagecoach system". He "inundated committees" with designs, and undercut his rivals' estimates. He also created unaccepted designs for a number of major buildings, including for King's College, Cambridge, Birmingham grammar school, and the new Houses of Parliament. Goodman died suddenly from "apoplexy" in 1835 at his home near Portman Square, London, and was buried in Kensal Green Cemetery.

== See also ==
- List of works by Francis Goodwin
