= List of new churches by Thomas Rickman =

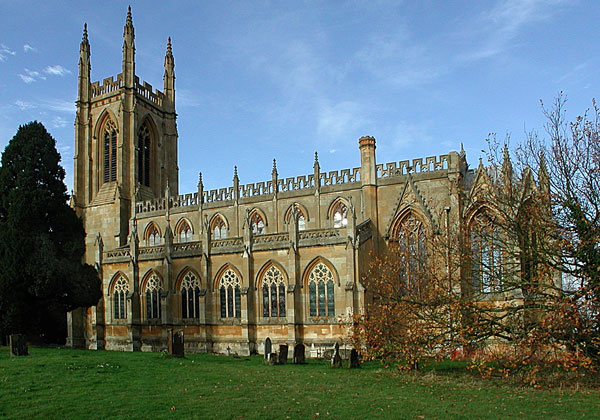
Church of St Peter ad Vincula, Hampton Lucy

Thomas Rickman (1776–1841) was a self-taught English architect known for his work in the Gothic Revival style. His architectural career spanned Liverpool and Birmingham, where he designed new churches, restored and altered existing ones, and worked on various other projects, including country houses, public buildings, schools, and banks.

Rickman was born in Maidenhead, Berkshire. Initially trained in medicine, he practiced in Lewes, Sussex, from 1801 to 1803. However, he soon left this career, working in London with a corn factor before moving to Liverpool in 1808 to work as an insurance clerk. It was during this time that Rickman developed a keen interest in Gothic architecture.

In Liverpool, Rickman met John Cragg, an iron foundry owner. Together, they designed three churches using cast iron for both construction and decoration. He also collaborated with John Slater on the redesign of Scarisbrick Hall. In 1817, he opened an architectural office in Liverpool, and the following year he was joined by Henry Hutchinson, initially as a pupil, and from 1821 as a partner. Meanwhile, in 1817 he published the first edition of An Attempt to Discriminate the Styles of English Architecture. In this he divided English architecture into styles that have continued to be accepted since, namely Norman, Early English, Decorated, and Perpendicular.

Rickman's involvement with the Church Commissioners led him to design several Commissioners' churches, beginning with St. George's Church in Birmingham. He opened an office in Birmingham in 1820 and moved there the following year. He was appointed architect to Worcester Cathedral and, with his partner Henry Hutchinson, started working on New Court at St John's College, Cambridge, his most significant commission. In 1830, Rickman was elected to the Society of Antiquaries of London, marking his professional recognition. After Hutchinson's death in 1831, R. C. Hussey joined Rickman's practice, becoming a partner in 1835. Rickman died from liver disease in 1841.

This list contains details of new churches designed by Thomas Rickman.

== Key ==
Grade	Criteria
Grade I	Buildings of exceptional interest, sometimes considered to be internationally important.
Grade II*	Particularly important buildings of more than special interest.
Grade II	Buildings of national importance and special interest.
"—" denotes a work that is not graded.

Name	Location	Photograph	Date	Notes	Grade
St George's Church	Everton, Liverpool, Merseyside; 53.4253°N 2.9715°W		1813–14	Built by John Cragg using much cast iron made in his own foundry.	I
St Michael's Church	St Michael's Hamlet, Liverpool, Merseyside; 53.3766°N 2.9499°W		1814	Built in conjunction with John Cragg, using much cast iron made in his own foundry.	I
St Philip's Church	Liverpool, Merseyside		1815–16	Built in conjunction with John Cragg, using much cast iron made in his own foundry. Demolished in 1882.	
St George's Church	Birmingham, West Midlands; 52.4907°N 1.9050°W		1819–21	Demolished. The gates and gate piers remain and are listed.	II
St George's Church	Barnsley, South Yorkshire; 53.5507°N 1.4852°W		1821	Demolished 1993. The churchyard walls, railings, gate piers and gates, also listed, remain.	II
St Mary's Church	Birkenhead, Merseyside; 53.3896°N 3.0113°W		1821	The church was declared redundant in 1975, and was partly demolished.	II
St Barnabas' Church	Erdington, Birmingham, West Midlands; 52.5232°N 1.8392°W		1822–23	A Commissioners' church.	II
Christ Church	Gloucester; 51.8605°N 2.2465°W		1822–23	Designed with Henry Hutchinson.	II
St George's Church	Chorley, Lancashire; 53.6521°N 2.6292°W		1822–25	A Commissioners' church.	II*
St Peter's Church	Preston, Lancashire; 53.7636°N 2.7082°W		1822–25	A Commissioners' church, designed with Henry Hutchinson. Now redundant and, as of 2012, part of the University of Central Lancashire.	II*
Church of St Peter ad Vincula	Hampton Lucy, Warwickshire; 52.2108°N 1.6260°W		1822–26	Designed with Henry Hutchinson and described as their magnum opus.	I
St Paul's Church	Preston, Lancashire; 53.7624°N 2.6941°W		1823–25	A Commissioners' church, designed with Henry Hutchinson. Now redundant and, as of 2012, in use as a radio station.	II
St Peter's Church	Dale End, Birmingham, West Midlands		1825–27	A Commissioners' church, designed with Henry Hutchinson. Demolished 1899.	
St Mary's Church	Mellor, Lancashire; 53.7729°N 2.5308°W		1825–27	A Commissioners' church, designed with Henry Hutchinson.	II
St Andrew's Church	Ombersley, Worcestershire; 52.2700°N 2.2295°W		1825–29	For the Marchioness of Downshire, designed with Henry Hutchinson.	II*
St Thomas' Church	Birmingham, West Midlands; 52.4732°N 1.9063°W		1826–29	A Commissioners' church, designed with Henry Hutchinson in neoclassical style. It was bombe in 1941 and only the west front has survived.	II
St James' Church	Lower Darwen, Lancashire; 53.7237°N 2.4652°W		1827–28	A Commissioners' church, designed with Henry Hutchinson. Rebuilt and replaced 1969.	
St Peter's Church	Darwen, Lancashire; 53.6955°N 2.4645°W		1827–29	A Commissioners' church, designed with Henry Hutchinson.	II*
St John the Evangelist's Church	Oulton, West Yorkshire; 53.74804°N 1.4559°W		1827–29	Designed with Henry Hutchinson.	II*
Christ Church	Carlisle, Cumbria		1828–30	A Commissioners' church designed with Henry Hutchinson. Damaged by fire in 1938, demolished 1952.	
Holy Trinity Church	Carlisle, Cumbria; 54.8920°N 2.9520°W		1828–30	A Commissioners' church designed with Henry Hutchinson. Demolished 1981.	
St John's Church	Whittle-le-Woods, Lancashire; 53.6885°N 2.6399°W		1829–30	Designed with Henry Hutchinson. Replaced in 1880–82.	
Holy Trinity Church	Lawrence Hill, Bristol; 51.4581°N 2.5761°W		1829–32	A Commissioners' church designed with Henry Hutchinson. It is now redundant.	II*
St Mary's Church	Tiddington, Oxfordshire; 51.7406°N 1.0519°W		1830	A small church for the Hon. Frederick Bertie.	II
Christ Church	Coventry, West Midlands		1830–32	A Commissioners' church designed with Henry Hutchinson. Bombed; only the medieval spire remains.	
St John the Divine's Church	Pemberton, Wigan, Greater Manchester; 53.5369°N 2.6830°W		1830–32	A Commissioners' church designed with Henry Hutchinson.	II
St David's Church	Haigh, Greater Manchester; 53.5759°N 2.5961°W		1830–33	A Commissioners' church designed with Henry Hutchinson.	II
St Mary's Church	Lower Hardres, Kent; 51.2371°N 1.0821°E		1831–32	Designed with Henry Hutchinson.	II
St Stephen's Church	Tockholes, Lancashire; 53.7061°N 2.5169°W		1831–33	A Commissioners' church designed with Henry Hutchinson. Replaced in 1965–66, retaining only the front of the south porch.	
All Saints Church	Handsworth, Birmingham, West Midlands		1832–33	A Commissioners' church designed with Henry Hutchinson. Chancel added 1881; since demolished.	
St Matthew's Church	Cotham, Bristol; 51.4641°N 2.5951°W		1833–35		II
Church of Our Lady of Mount Carmel	Redditch, Worcestershire; 52.3054°N 1.9317°W		1834		II
Emmanuel Church	Charnwood, Leicestershire; 52.7670°N 1.2105°W		1835–37	A Commissioners' church.	II
All Saints Church	Stretton-on-Dunsmore, Warwickshire; 52.3493°N 1.4041°W		1835–37		II*
Church of the Holy Ascension	Settle, North Yorkshire; 54.0705°N 2.2773°W		1836–38		II
St. Stephen's Church	Sneinton, Nottingham; 52.9510°N 1.1316°W		1837–39	Designed with R. C. Hussey. Of their design the tower and part of the south transept remain, the rest being replaced in 1909–12.	II
Christ Church	Clevedon, Somerset; 51.4390°N 2.8518°W		1838–39	Designed with R. C. Hussey.	II*

== See also ==
- List of church restorations and alterations by Thomas Rickman
- List of non-ecclesiastical works by Thomas Rickman
