= List of Commissioners' churches in the English Midlands =

A Commissioners' church is an Anglican church in the United Kingdom built with money voted by Parliament as a result of the Church Building Act 1818, and subsequent related Acts. Such churches have been given a number of titles, including "Commissioners' Churches", "Waterloo Churches" and "Million Act Churches". In some cases the Commissioners provided the full cost of the new church; in other cases they provided a grant and the balance was raised locally. This list contains the Commissioners' churches in the East Midlands and the West Midlands.

== Key ==
| Grade | Criteria |
|---|---|
| Grade I | Buildings of exceptional interest, sometimes considered to be internationally important. |
| Grade II* | Particularly important buildings of more than special interest. |
| Grade II | Buildings of national importance and special interest. |
"—" denotes a work that is not graded.

== Churches ==
| Name and location | Photograph | Date | Grant in £ | Architect | Notes and refs. | Grade |
|---|---|---|---|---|---|---|
| St George, Birmingham, West Midlands | — | 1819–22 | 12,752 | Thomas Rickman | Gothic Revival with a tower and clerestory. Demolished 1960. | — |
| All Saints, Trefonen, Shropshire; 52.8342°N 3.0984°W | — | 1820 | 300 | Thomas Jones | Gothic Revival with a porch and belfry. Chancel added 1876. | — |
| Holy Trinity Church, Bordesley, West Midlands; 52.4705°N 1.8775°W | | 1820–22 | 14,246 | Francis Goodwin | Gothic Revival with two west turrets. Redundant since 1971. | II |
| St. Paul's Church, George Street, Nottingham | — | 1821–23 | 15,748 | William Wilkins | Neoclassical Doric with a tower and cupola. Demolished. | — |
| St George, Kidderminster, Worcestershire; 52.3903°N 2.2425°W | — | 1821–24 | 17,047 | Francis Goodwin | Gothic Revival with a tower. Restored in 1924 after a fire. | II* |
| Christ Church, West Bromwich, West Midlands | | 1821–28 | 17,273 | Francis Goodwin | Gothic Revival with a tower. Altered about 1880. | — |
| St. Barnabas, Erdington, Birmingham; 52.5231°N 1.8393°W | | 1822–23 | 5,348 | Thomas Rickman | Gothic Revival with a tower. Additions in 1883. | II |
| St Paul, Stockingford, Nuneaton, Warwickshire; 52.5195°N 1.5099°W | | 1822–23 | 2,354 | John Russell | Neoclassical with a tower. Chancel added 1897. | II |
| St Peter, Belper, Derbyshire; 53.0252°N 1.4785°W | — | 1822–24 | 11,922 | Matthew Habershon | Gothic Revival with a west tower and pinnacles. | II |
| St George, Leicester; 52.6344°N 1.1268°W | | 1823–26 | 16,130 | William Parsons | Gothic Revival with a tower and spire. Burnt in 1911 and restored. | II |
| St Peter, Dale End, Birmingham, West Midlands | — | 1825–27 | 18,066 | Thomas Rickman and Henry Hutchinson | Neoclassical Doric with a cupola. Demolished 1899. | — |
| St John the Evangelist, Derby, Derbyshire; 52.9258°N 1.4880°W | | 1826–28 | 4,619 | Francis Goodwin | Gothic Revival with four angle turrets. Chancel added in 1871. | II* |
| St Thomas' Church, Holloway Head, Birmingham, West Midlands; 52.4732°N 1.9063°W | | 1826–29 | 15,915 | Thomas Rickman and Henry Hutchinson | Greek Revival with a tower. Bombed 1941 and only the west front has survived. | II |
| St George, Newcastle-under-Lyme, Staffordshire; 53.0141°N 2.2243°W | | 1827–28 | 4,952 | Francis Octavius Bedford | Gothic Revival with a tower and pinnacles. Later additions. | II* |
| St Mary, Bilston, West Midlands; 52.5639°N 2.0680°W | | 1827–29 | 7,749 | Francis Goodwin | Gothic Revival with a tower. | II* |
| Christ Church, Coseley, West Midlands; 52.5461°N 2.0801°W | | 1827–29 | 8,632 | Thomas Lee, junior | Gothic Revival with a tower. Restored in 1883. | II |
| St Andrew, Netherton, West Midlands; 52.4908°N 2.0925°W | | 1827–29 | 8,661 | Thomas Lee, junior | Gothic Revival with a tower. Subsequent additions. | II |
| St Paul, Burslem, Staffordshire | — | 1828–29 | 7,763 | Lewis Vulliamy | Gothic Revival with a tower. Rebuilt in 1874; subsequently demolished. | — |
| St George's Church, Wolverhampton, West Midlands; 52.5830°N 2.1228°W | | 1828–30 | 6,968 | James Morgan | Neoclassical Doric with a tower and spire. Redundant since 1978. | II |
| St George, Claines, Worcestershire | — | 1829–30 | 2,195 | James Lucy | Gothic Revival with a tower. Demolished 1894. | — |
| St George, New Mills, Derbyshire; 53.3659°N 1.9941°W | | 1829–30 | 2,691 | Robert Dennis Chantrell | Gothic Revival with a tower and spire. Chancel added in 1897–98. | II |
| Holy Trinity, Wordsley, West Midlands; 52.4797°N 2.1601°W | | 1829–30 | 3,818 | Lewis Vulliamy | Gothic Revival with a tower. | II |
| St George, Frankwell, Shrewsbury, Shropshire; 52.7123°N 2.7601°W | | 1829–31 | 2,551 | Edward Haycock | Gothic Revival with a tower and transepts. | II |
| St Thomas' Church, Brampton, Chesterfield, Derbyshire; 53.2317°N 1.4591°W | | 1830–31 | 2,063 | John Woodhead and William Hurst | Gothic Revival with a west tower. Chancel added 1891. | II |
| St James' Church, Riddings, Derbyshire; 53.0704°N 1.3612°W | | 1830–31 | 2,140 | Francis Octavius Bedford | Gothic Revival with a tower and spire. | II |
| Christ Church, Tunstall, Staffordshire; 53.0625°N 2.2113°W | | 1830–31 | 2,146 | Francis Octavius Bedford | Gothic Revival with a tower and spire. Later additions. | II |
| Christ Church, Coventry, West Midlands | — | 1830–32 | 8,986 | Thomas Rickman and Henry Hutchinson | Gothic Revival style. Bombed; only the medieval spire remains. | — |
| St Mark, Shelton, Staffordshire; 53.0189°N 2.1820°W | | 1831–33 | 9,381 | John Oates | Gothic Revival with a tower. Chancel added 1868. | II |
| All Saints, Handsworth, Birmingham, West Midlands | — | 1832–33 | 1,020 | Thomas Rickman and Henry Hutchinson | Gothic Revival with turrets. Chancel added 1881; demolished. | — |
| Holy Trinity, Wrockwardine Wood, Shropshire; 52.7106°N 2.4465°W | | 1832–33 | 300 | John Baddeley | Greek Revival in brick with a tower. Later enlarged. | II |
| St James the Less, Longton, Staffordshire52.9854°N 2.1290°W | | 1832–34 | 10,273 | Thomas Johnson | Gothic Revival with a tower. Rebuilt in 1878. | II |
| Emmanuel, Loughborough, Leicestershire; 52.7670°N 1.2105°W | | 1835–37 | 2,143 | Thomas Rickman | Gothic Revival with a tower. Additions in 1909 and 1990. | II |
| St Luke, Ironbridge, Shropshire; 52.6284°N 2.4852°W | | 1836–37 | 200 | Thomas Smith | Gothic Revival with a tower. | II |
| St Stephen, Sneinton, Nottingham; 52.9511°N 1.1317°W | | 1837–39 | 1,303 | Thomas Rickman and R. C. Hussey | Gothic Revival with a tower. Expanded in 1912. | II |
| Christ Church, Catshill, Worcestershire; 52.3642°N 2.0642°W | | c. 1838 | 200 | Harvey Eginton | Gothic Revival with a tower. Chancel added in 1871. | II |
| St James the Great, Eve Hill, Dudley, West Midlands; 52.5132°N 2.0945°W | | 1838–39 | 750 | William Bourne | Gothic Revival with a west tower. Chancel added in 1869. | II |
| St Paul, Tipton, West Midlands; 52.5299°N 2.0676°W | — | 1838–39 | 2,000 | Robert Ebbels | Gothic Revival with a tower. Altered in 1899. | — |
| Christ Church, Wellington, Shropshire; 52.6973°N 2.5111°W | | 1838–39 | 400 | Thomas Smith | Gothic Revival style. | II |
| Holy Trinity, Ashby-de-la-Zouch, Leicestershire; 52.7458°N 1.4757°W | | 1838–40 | 400 | Henry Isaac Stevens | Gothic Revival with a tower. Chancel added 1866. | II |
| St James, Daventry, Northamptonshire | — | 1839 | 200 | Hugh Smith | Demolished 1962. | — |
| St Peter, Coventry, West Midlands; 52.4125°N 1.5005°W | | 1840–41 | 800 | Robert Ebbels | Gothic Revival with a west tower. Now redundant. | II |
| St Paul, Foleshill, Coventry, West Midlands | — | 1840–41 | 500 | James Ackroyd | Gothic Revival with a tower. Bombed; demolished. | — |
| St Peter, Upper Gornal, West Midlands; 52.5268°N 2.1141°W | | 1840–41 | 722 | Robert Ebbels | Gothic Revival with two turrets. Chancel added in 1857, apse in 1865. | — |
| Christ Church, Oldbury, West Midlands; 52.5032°N 2.0150°W | | 1840–41 | 3,142 | Thomas Johnson | Gothic Revival with a northwest tower in brick. Chancel added 1867. | II |
| Holy Trinity, Attleborough, Nuneaton, Warwickshire; 52.5144°N 1.4562°W | | 1841 | 250 | Thomas Larkins Walker | Gothic Revival with a tower and spire. | II |
| St Edmund, Northampton | — | 1841 | 250 | Charles Vickers | Gothic Revival style. Enlarged 1891; demolished. | — |
| Holy Trinity, Gainsborough, Lincolnshire; 53.3949°N 0.7717°W | | 1841–42 | 600 | Thomas Johnson | Gothic Revival with a steeple. Chancel added 1864. | II |
| St Thomas, Mow Cop, Staffordshire; 53.1127°N 2.2101°W | | 1841–42 | 300 | Thomas Stanley | Gothic Revival with a tower. | II |
| St John the Baptist, Kidderminster, Worcestershire; 52.3870°N 2.2613°W | — | 1842–43 | 200 | George Alexander | Norman Revival in brick with a tower and spire. Rebuilt in 1890–94 other than the tower and spire. | — |
| St. Paul's Church, Hyson Green, Nottingham | — | 1843 | 325 | Henry Isaac Stevens | Enlarged 1889–95. | — |
| Christ Church, Burton upon Trent, Staffordshire; 52.8020°N 1.6387°W | — | 1843–44 | 400 | Joseph Mitchell | Gothic Revival with a west tower and transepts. | II |
| St. John the Baptist, Leenside, Nottingham | — | 1843–44 | 800 | George Gilbert Scott and William Bonython Moffatt | Gothic Revival with a bell turret. Bombed; demolished. | — |
| St Michael, Pelsall, West Midlands; 52.6255°N 1.9711°W | | 1843–44 | 250 | George Hamilton | Gothic Revival style. Tower added in 1875; chancel in 1889. | — |
| St John, Brockmoor, Dudley, West Midlands; 52.4861°N 2.1333°W | — | 1844–45 | 500 | Thomas Smith | Norman Revival in brick with transepts and a cupola. | II |
| St Thomas, Keresley, West Midlands | — | 1844–45 | 300 | Benjamin Ferrey | Gothic Revival with a west tower and spire. | II |
| Christ Church, Radford, Nottingham | — | 1844–45 | 500 | Henry Isaac Stevens | Gothic Revival with a bell gable. Demolished about 1948. | — |
| St John the Evangelist, Hazelwood, Derbyshire; 53.0113°N 1.5124°W | | 1844–46 | 200 | Henry Isaac Stevens | Gothic Revival with a bellcote. Restored in 1903 after a fire. | II |
| St James the Great, Whitfield, Derbyshire; 53.4464°N 1.9512°W | — | 1844–46 | 1,000 | Edwin Shellard | Gothic Revival with a tower and spire. Chancel enlarged in 1897. | — |
| St Luke, Little Dawley, Shropshire | — | 1845 | 300 | Robert Griffiths | Norman Revival with a bell turret. Converted into residential accommodation. | II |
| St John, Wednesbury, West Midlands | — | 1845 | 400 | Samuel Daukes and John R. Hamilton | Gothic Revival with a northwest tower. Restored in 1883. | — |
| St Peter, East Stockwith, Lincolnshire; 53.4415°N 0.8160°W | | 1845–46 | 100 | Thomas Johnson | Gothic Revival with a bell turret. Restored in 1899. | II |
| St Paul, Morton, Lincolnshire; 53.4138°N 0.7830°W | | 1845–46 | 150 | Thomas Johnson | Gothic Revival with a tower. Replaced in 1891, other than the tower. | II* |
| Christ Church, Quarry Bank, Dudley, West Midlands; 52.4724°N 2.1056°W | | 1845–46 | 500 | Thomas Smith | Gothic Revival in brick with a cupola and transepts. Chancel added 1897. | — |
| St Luke, Cradley Heath, West Midlands; 52.4733°N 2.0789°W | | 1845–47 | 500 | William Bourne | Gothic Revival with transepts. Apse added 1874. | — |
| St Mark, Pensnett, Dudley, West Midlands; 52.5024°N 2.1267°W | | 1846–49 | 500 | John Derick | Gothic Revival with a tower and turrets. Restored in 1924. | II |
| Christ Church, Cotmanhay, Derbyshire | — | 1847 | 300 | Henry Isaac Stevens | Gothic Revival with a polygonal bell turret. Demolished in 1987. | — |
| Holy Trinity, Milford, Derbyshire; 53.0045°N 1.4782°W | | 1847–48 | 250 | William Bonython Moffatt | Gothic Revival with a northwest bell turret. Vestry added in 1910. | II |
| St James, Wednesbury, West Midlands; 52.5521°N 2.0268°W | — | 1847–48 | 500 | William Horton | Gothic Revival with a tower. Enlarged in 1857, 1865, and 1885. | — |
| St Matthew, Etruria, Staffordshire | — | 1847–49 | 250 | Henry Ward and Son | Gothic Revival with a bell turret. | — |
| Holy Trinity, Hanley, Staffordshire | — | 1847–49 | 325 | Henry Ward and Son | Norman Revival with a turret. | — |
| Holy Trinity, Stoke-on-Trent, Staffordshire; 53.0299°N 2.1676°W | — | 1847–49 | 250 | James Trubshaw | Gothic Revival with a bell turret, north tower and spire. | II |
| St Mark, Chapel Ash, Wolverhampton, West Midlands; 52.5845°N 2.1373°W | | 1848–49 | 250 | Charles Orford | Gothic Revival with a west tower and spire. Redundant since 1978. | II |
| St John, Charlesworth, Derbyshire; 53.4328°N 1.9950°W | | 1848–49 | 250 | Joseph Mitchell | Gothic Revival with a north tower. | II |
| St Thomas, Coventry, West Midlands | — | 1848–49 | 230 | Edmund Sharpe and E. G. Paley | Gothic Revival with a northwest turret. Demolished. | II |
| St Matthew, Wolverhampton, West Midlands | — | 1848–49 | 300 | Edward Banks | Gothic Revival style. Demolished 1963. | — |
| St Saviour, Saltley, Birmingham, West Midlands; 52.4868°N 1.8582°W | | 1848–50 | 300 | R. C. Hussey | Gothic Revival style. Spire added 1871. | II |
| St Mark, Ocker Hill, Tipton, West Midlands; 52.5428°N 2.0444°W | | 1849 | 250 | George Hamilton and Henry Saunders | Gothic Revival in brick with a bell gable. | — |
| St Jude, Birmingham, West Midlands | — | 1850–51 | 500 | Charles Orford | Gothic Revival with a bell turret. Demolished. | — |
| All Saints, Moxley, West Midlands; 52.5605°N 2.0465°W | — | 1850–51 | 260 | William Horton | Gothic Revival style. Steeple added 1877. | — |
| Holy Trinity, Wednesfield Heath, West Midlands; 52.5962°N 2.1029°W | — | 1850–52 | 220 | Edward Banks | Gothic Revival with a tower. | — |
| St Luke, Bilston, West Midlands | — | 1851–52 | 300 | Thomas Johnson | Gothic Revival with a southeast tower. | — |
| Holy Trinity, Chesterton, Staffordshire; 53.0419°N 2.2529°W | | 1851–52 | 150 | Henry Ward and Son | Gothic Revival with a tower. | II |
| St George, Darlaston, West Midlands | — | 1851–52 | 300 | Thomas Johnson | Gothic Revival style. Altered in 1885 adding a northwest steeple. | — |
| Holy Trinity, Sneyd, Staffordshire | — | 1851–52 | 350 | George Thomas Robinson | Gothic Revival with a tower and spire. | — |
| St John the Evangelist, Ladywood, Birmingham, West Midlands; 52.4775°N 1.9275°W | — | 1851–54 | 267 | Samuel Sanders Teulon | Gothic Revival style. Chancel and transepts added in 1881. | II |
| St Paul, Balsall Heath, Birmingham, West Midlands; 52.4580°N 1.8917°W | — | 1852–53 | 300 | James Lyndon Pedley | Gothic Revival with a tower. Enlarged in 1868. | — |
| St Luke, Hanley, Staffordshire; 53.0240°N 2.1683°W | — | 1852–54 | 200 | Henry Ward and Son | Gothic Revival with a tower. | — |
| St Paul, Edensor, Longton, Staffordshire | — | 1853 | 300 | Henry Ward and Son | Gothic Revival style. | — |
| St Luke, Silverdale, Staffordshire; 53.0174°N 2.2731°W | | 1853 | 100 | Richard Armstrong | Gothic Revival with a steeple. | II |
| Holy Trinity, Coalbrookdale, Shropshire; 52.6369°N 2.4883°W | | 1853–54 | 10 | Reeves and Butcher | Gothic Revival with a tower. | II* |
| St John the Divine, Leicester; 52.6304°N 1.1266°W | | 1853–54 | 1,000 | George Gilbert Scott | Gothic Revival style. Converted into flats. | II |
| St Stephen, Willenhall, West Midlands | — | 1853–54 | 300 | William Darby Griffin | Gothic Revival with a west bell gable. Demolished 1978. | — |
| Stratford-upon-Avon, Warwickshire | — | c. 1854 | 80 | James Murray | Gothic Revival style. Northwest tower and spire added 1875–93. | — |
| Holy Trinity, Short Heath, Willenhall, West Midlands; 52.6058°N 2.0362°W | | 1854–55 | 245 | William Horton | Gothic Revival style. | — |
| St Matthew, Smethwick, Staffordshire; 52.4915°N 1.9563°W | — | 1854–55 | 125 | Joseph James | Gothic Revival with a bell turret. | II |
| St John the Evangelist, Mansfield, Nottinghamshire; 53.1465°N 1.2016°W | | 1854–56 | 100 | Henry Isaac Stevens | Gothic Revival style. | II |
| St Matthias, Birmingham, West Midlands | — | 1855–56 | 380 | James Lyndon Pedley | Gothic Revival with a bell turret. Bombed; demolished 1952. | — |

== See also ==
- List of Commissioners' churches in eastern England
- List of Commissioners' churches in London
- List of Commissioners' churches in Northeast and Northwest England
- List of Commissioners' churches in southwest England
- List of Commissioners' churches in Wales
- List of Commissioners' churches in Yorkshire
