= St John the Divine's Church, Pemberton =

Coordinates: 53.5369°N 2.6830°W

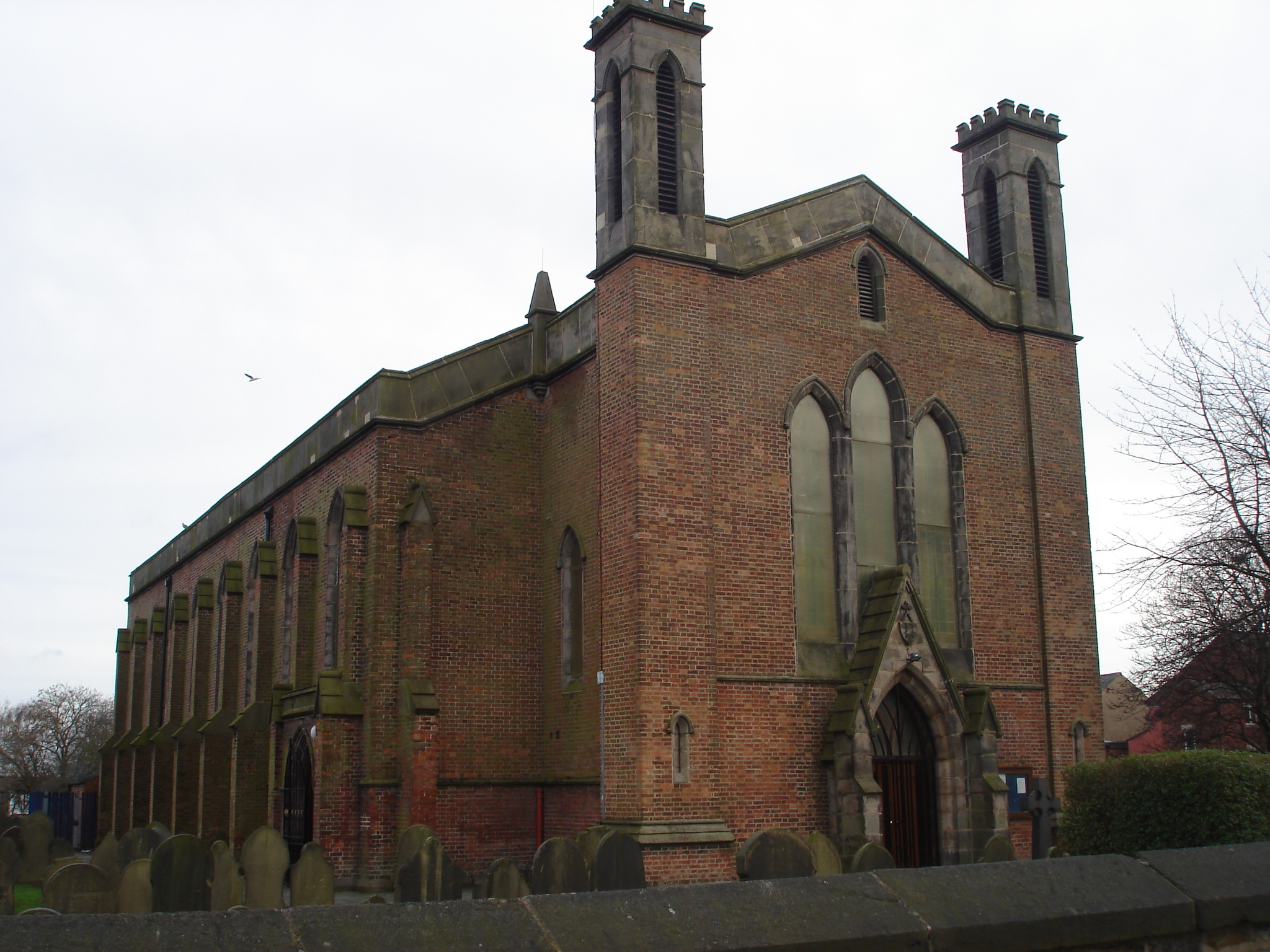

- Location in Greater Manchester
- OS grid reference: SD 548,047
- Location: Church Street, Lamberhead Green, Pemberton, Wigan, Greater Manchester
- Country: England
- Denomination: Anglican
- Website: St John the Divine, Pemberton

History
- Status: Parish church
- Dedication: Saint John the Divine
- Consecrated: 26 September 1832

Architecture
- Functional status: Active
- Heritage designation: Grade II
- Designated: 8 August 1999
- Architect(s): Thomas Rickman and Henry Hutchinson
- Architectural type: Church
- Style: Gothic Revival
- Groundbreaking: 1830
- Completed: 1832
- Construction cost: £4,913

Specifications
- Capacity: 900
- Materials: Brick, sandstone dessings Slate roofs

Administration
- Province: York
- Diocese: Liverpool
- Archdeaconry: Warrington
- Deanery: Wigan
- Parish: Pemberton

Clergy
- Priest: Revd Philip Anderson

St John the Divine's Church is in Church Street, Lamberhead Green, Pemberton, Wigan, Greater Manchester, England. It is an active Anglican parish church in the deanery of Wigan, the archdeaconry of Warrington, and the diocese of Liverpool. The church is recorded in the National Heritage List for England as a designated Grade II listed building. It was a Commissioners' church, having received a grant towards its construction from the Church Building Commission.

== History ==
The church was built between 1830 and 1832 to a design by Thomas Rickman and Henry Hutchinson. A grant of £4,913 (equivalent to £480,000 in 2025) was given towards its construction by the Church Building Commission. It was consecrated on 26 September 1832, and was originally a chapel of ease to Wigan Parish Church. Between 2008 and 2011 the church was modernised with the creation of a kitchen, toilets and a meeting area at the west end.

== Architecture ==
St John's is constructed in brick with sandstone dressings, and has slate roofs. Its architectural style is Gothic Revival. The plan consists of a nine-bay nave, north and south aisles, north and south porches, and a short single-bay chancel. At the west end are corner pilasters, each containing a blind lancet window, rising to a turret containing a louvred lancet, and with an embattled parapet. In the centre of the west front is a gabled doorway flanked by buttresses, the gable of the doorway containing a shield. Above it is a triple stepped lancet window, and over this is a blind lancet. Each bay along the sides of the aisles contains a lancet window. The east window consists of a stepped triple lancet. Inside the church are three galleries carried on cast iron columns. The ceiling is flat.

== External features ==
The boundary walls and gates to the west and south of the churchyard are also listed at Grade II. The walls and gate piers are in sandstone, and the elaborate gates are in wrought iron. The churchyard contains 25 war graves of Commonwealth service personnel, 14 of World War I and 11 of World War II.

== See also ==
- List of churches in Greater Manchester
- List of Commissioners' churches in Northeast and Northwest England
- List of new churches by Thomas Rickman
- Listed buildings in Wigan
