= List of non-ecclesiastical works by Thomas Rickman =

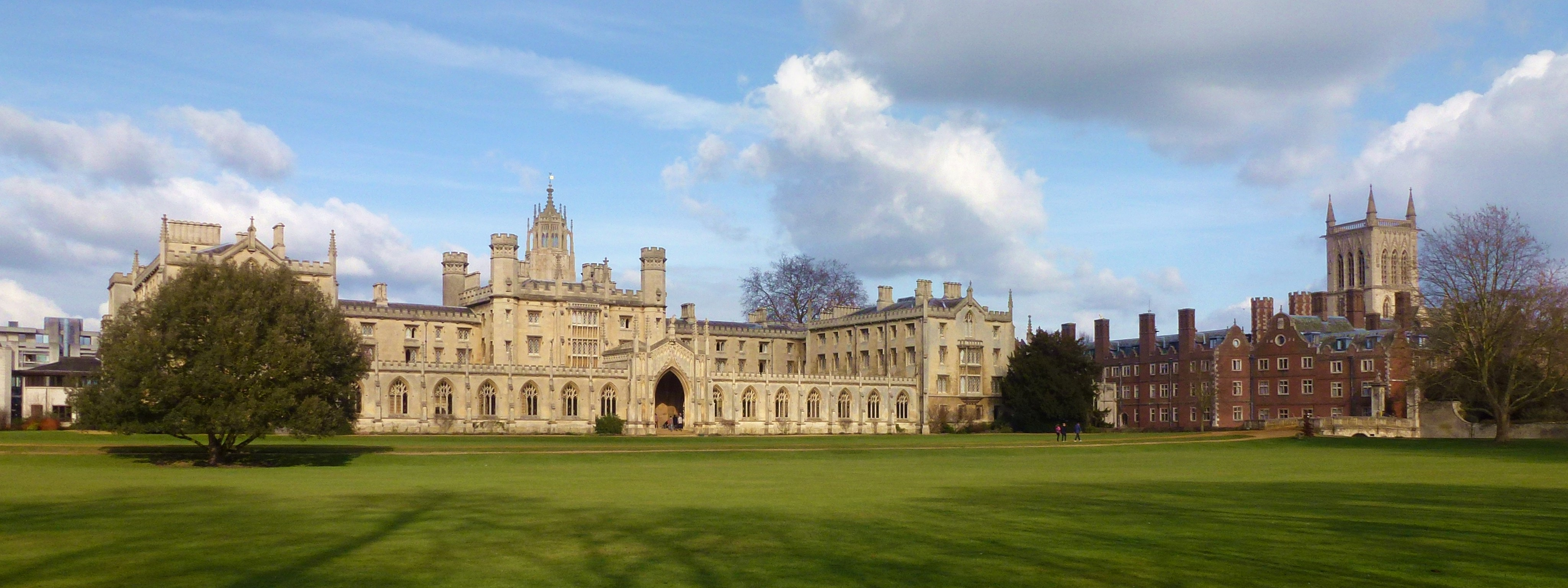
New Court, St John's College, Cambridge

Thomas Rickman (1776–1841) was a self-taught English architect who practised in Liverpool and Birmingham. His major output consisted of new churches, most of which were in Gothic Revival style. He also restored and made additions and alterations to churches, and worked on other designs, including country houses, public buildings, schools, and banks.

Rickman was born in Maidenhead, Berkshire. He trained in medicine and practised in Lewes, Sussex, from 1801 to 1803, but did not continue in this career, working in London with a corn factor, and then moving to Liverpool in 1808 to work as an insurance clerk. During this time he had begun to take an interest in Gothic architecture. While in Liverpool he met John Cragg, the owner of an iron foundry, and with him designed three churches. using cast iron for both their construction and decoration. He then worked with John Slater in the redesign of Scarisbrick Hall. In 1817 he opened an architectural office in Liverpool, and the following year he was joined by Henry Hutchinson, initially as a pupil, and from 1821 as a partner. Meanwhile, in 1817 he published the first edition of An Attempt to Discriminate the Styles of English Architecture. In this he divided English architecture into styles that have continued to be accepted since, namely Norman, Early English, Decorated, and Perpendicular.

Rickman then became involved with the Church Commissioners, designing, with others, a series of churches that have become to be known as Commissioners' churches, the first of his being St George's Church in Birmingham. He opened an office in that city in 1820, and moved there with Hutchinson the following year, where he spent the rest of his career. At about this time he was appointed as architect to Worcester Cathedral, and shortly after this he started work with Hutchinson on what was to become his major commission, New Court at St John's College, Cambridge. In 1830 he was elected to the Society of Antiquaries of London, thus acknowledging his acceptance into the profession. Hutchinson died in 1831, and during that year R. C. Hussey joined the practice, becoming a partner in 1835. Rickman died from liver disease in 1841.

This list includes details of works on non-ecclesiastical buildings by Thomas Rickman.

== Key ==
Grade	Criteria
Grade I	Buildings of exceptional interest, sometimes considered to be internationally important.
Grade II*	Particularly important buildings of more than special interest.
Grade II	Buildings of national importance and special interest.
"—" denotes a work that is not graded.

== Churches ==
Name	Location	Photograph	Date	Notes	Grade
Scarisbrick Hall	Scarisbrick, Lancashire; 53.6064°N 2.9208°W		1813–16	Additions to a country house dating from 1595; almost certain that Rickman contributed to these.	I
Gwrych Castle	Abergele, Conwy, Wales; 53.2833°N 3.6087°W		1819–20	Rickman was involved in drawing up the early plans.	I
Maitland House	Gloucester; 51.8605°N 2.2493°W		c. 1820	Designed for Alexander Maitland, a former London merchant. As of 2012 in use as offices.	II
Town Hall (former)	Clitheroe, Lancashire; 53.8733°N 2.3905°W		1820–22	Now forms part of Clitheroe Library.	II
Ettington Park Hotel	Ettington, Warwickshire; 52.1238°N 1.6400°W		1824	Originated as a country house; interior alterations, (with Henry Hutchinson).	I
Sessions House	Preston, Lancashire; 53.7613°N 2.6882°W		1825	Designed as a court house; as of 2012, used as a museum.	II
Down House	Redmarley D'Abitot, Gloucestershire; 51.9724°N 2.3366°W		1825	A country house for G. Dowdeswell. The stables are also listed at Grade II.	II
Castle Bromwich Hall	Castle Bromwich, Solihull, West Midlands; 52.5057°N 1.7910°W		1825–40	Enlarged by the addition of a wing and passages.	I
New Court, St John's College	Cambridge; 52.2088°N 0.1150°E		1826–31	Designed with Henry Hutchinson.	I
Brunstock House	Stanwix Rural, Cumbria; 54.9261°N 2.9085°W		1827–33	New house for George Saul.	II*
Matfen Hall	Matfen, Northumberland; 55.0393°N 1.9523°W		1828–30	Designed by Rickman for Sir Edward Blacket who completed it himself. As of 2012 it is used as a hotel.	II*
Rose Castle	Dalston, Cumbria; 54.8064°N 2.9802°W		1828–31	Alterations to the home of the bishops of Carlisle.	I
Midland Bank	Bennett's Hill, Birmingham, West Midlands; 52.4802°N 1.9001°W		1830	Designed with Henry Hutchinson.	II
Henbury Village Hall	Henbury, Bristol; 51.5069°N 2.6309°W		1830	Built originally as a school in Jacobean style. Later a village hall.	II
Weston Park	Shifnal, Shropshire 52.6908°N 2.2893°E		1830-1833	Addition of West Wing with Henry Hutchinson and Richard Charles Hussey	I
Drapers' Hall	Coventry, West Midlands; 52.4076°N 1.5072°W		1832	Designed with Henry Hutchinson.	II*
Goodnestone Park	Goodnestone, Kent; 51.2437°N 1.2271°E		1838–44	Alterations (with R. C. Hussey).	II*

== See also ==
- List of new churches by Thomas Rickman
- List of church restorations and alterations by Thomas Rickman
