= St Peter's Church, Dale End =

St Peter’s Church, Dale End
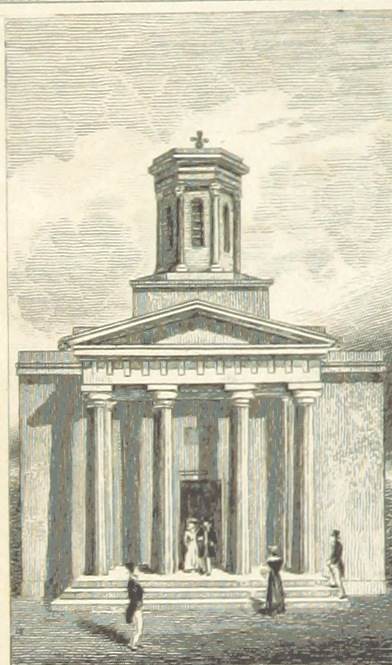
- St Peter’s Church
- St Peter’s Church, Dale End
- 52°28′54.84″N 1°53′32.28″W
- OS grid reference: SP 07410 87112
- Location: Birmingham
- Country: England
- Denomination: Church of England

History
- Dedication: St Peter
- Consecrated: 10 August 1827

Architecture
- Architect(s): Thomas Rickman and Henry Hutchinson
- Style: Greek Revival
- Groundbreaking: 27 July 1825
- Completed: 1827
- Construction cost: £19,676
- Demolished: 1899

Specifications
- Capacity: 1,900 people

St Peter's Church, Dale End is a former Church of England parish church in Birmingham.

== History ==
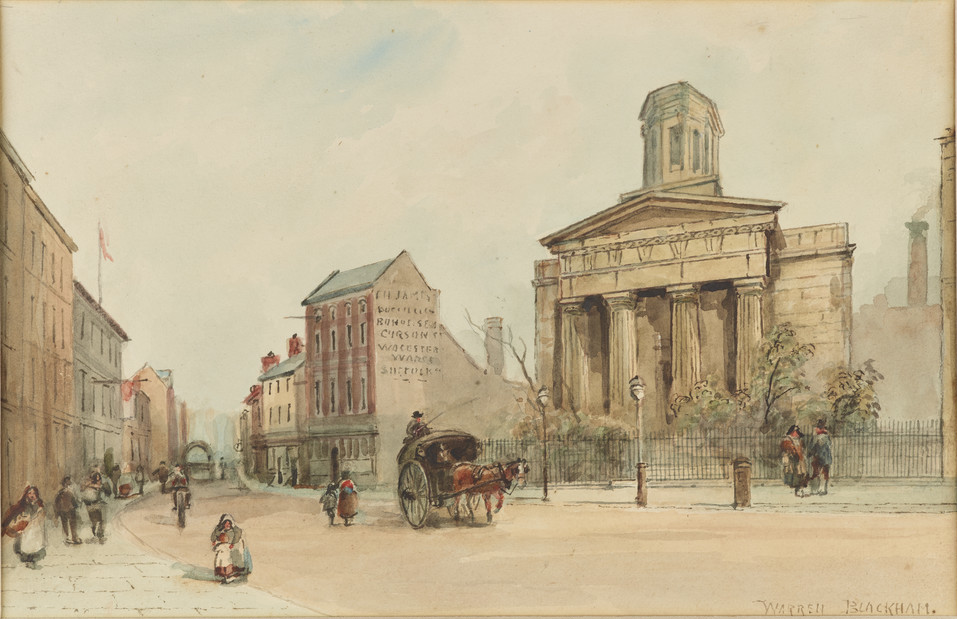
Watercolour painting by George Warren Blackham

The memorial stone was laid on 27 July 1825 with the following inscription

The first Stone of a New Church, Dedicated to Saint Peter, was laid on the 26th day of July, 1825, by the Rev. Charles Curtis, The Rev Laurence Gardner, D.D. and James Taylor, Esquire, the Local Commissioners for building Churches in this District. The expense of the Site and Structure amounting to £19,676. 2s 11d. was defrayed out of a Parliamentary Grant of £1,000,000. The Hon. and Right Rev. Henry Ryder, D.D. Lord Bishop of the Diocese. The Rev. Laurence Gardner, D.D. Rector of the Parish. John Welshman Whateley, John Cope, Churchwardens of the Parish. Messrs. Rickman & Hutchinson, Architects.

The church was built in the Greek Revival style to designs by the architects, Thomas Rickman and Henry Hutchinson. It was consecrated by the Bishop of Worcester on 10 August 1827.

On 23 January 1831 a fire destroyed the roof and the interior, but it was rebuilt and reopened on 3 September 1837 by the Bishop of Worcester.

A parish was assigned out of St Philip's Church, Birmingham in 1847.

The church was closed in 1897 and demolished, and the endowments were transferred to the new parish of St Peter's Church, Spring Hill.

== Organ ==
An organ was installed by Elliott and Hill of London and opened by Samuel Wesley on 23 May 1828 but this was destroyed in the fire in 1831. A new organ was opened on 25 August 1839 built by Messrs Berosher and Fleetwood of Liverpool. The opening recital was given by George Hollins.

=== Organists ===
- John Twelch Greaves 1828 - 1831 (formerly organist of St Editha's Church, Tamworth and afterwards organist of St Editha's Church, Tamworth
