= St Peter's Church, Preston, Lancashire =

Coordinates: 53.7636°N 2.7082°W

St Peter's Church, Preston
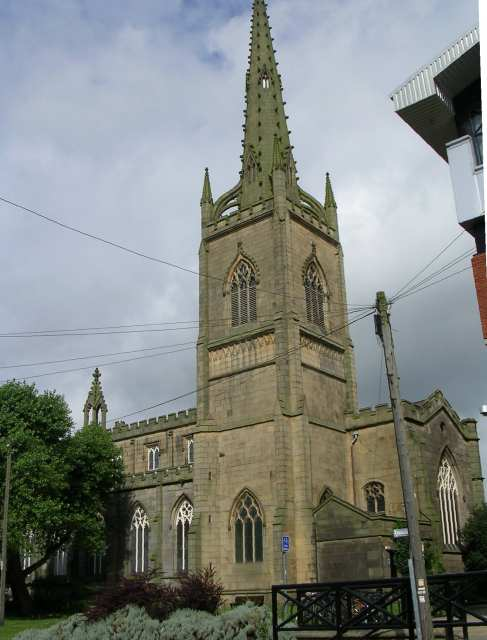
- St Peter's Church, Preston, from the southeast

- Location in Preston
- OS grid reference: SD 53419 29925
- Location: St Peter's Square, Preston, Lancashire
- Country: England
- Denomination: Anglican

History
- Status: Parish church

Architecture
- Functional status: Redundant
- Heritage designation: Grade II*
- Designated: 12 June 1950
- Architect(s): Thomas Rickman and Henry Hutchinson; Joseph Mitchell
- Architectural type: Church
- Style: Gothic Revival
- Groundbreaking: 1822
- Completed: 1852
- Closed: 1973

Specifications
- Materials: Sandstone

St Peter's Church is a redundant Anglican parish church in St Peter's Square, Preston, Lancashire, England. It is recorded in the National Heritage List for England as a designated Grade II* listed building. It was a Commissioners' church, having received a grant towards its construction from the Church Building Commission. In 1973 it became part of Preston Polytechnic, later the University of Central Lancashire.

== History ==
St Peter's was built between 1822 and 1825, and was designed by Thomas Rickman and Henry Hutchinson. A grant of £6,765 (equivalent to £640,000 in 2025) was given towards its construction by the Church Building Commission. The steeple was added in 1851–52 by Joseph Mitchell. A bequest of £1,000 (equivalent to £120,000 in 2025) was made towards the cost of the steeple by Thomas German, alderman and mayor of the borough. The church was taken over in 1973 by Preston Polytechnic (later the University of Central Lancashire). It became known as St Peters Arts Centre.

== Architecture ==
=== Exterior ===
The former church is constructed in sandstone. Its architectural style is Decorated. The plan consists of a six-bay nave with a clerestory, north and south aisles, a chancel with an organ house to the north and a vestry to the south, and a southeast steeple in the angle between the aisle and the chancel. At the west end of each aisle is a tall projecting porch. Both porches have two-light windows and embattled parapets; the south porch has an arched south doorway, and the north porch has a link to a glazed extension added in the 20th century. At the west end of the nave is a small two-light window, tall embattled turrets at the corners, and a large crocketed bellcote on the apex of the gable. The clerestory has two-light square-headed windows on each side, and an embattled parapet. The windows along the sides of the aisles have two-centred arches and contain three lights, with two types of tracery. The chancel has a five-light east window, and embattled turrets at the corners. The tower is in three stages, with angle buttresses, and a stair turret at the south west corner. In the bottom stage is a three-light window, and there are bands of blind arcading in the middle stage. The bell openings each have three louvred lights. The parapet is embattled with crocketed corner pinnacles. Flying buttresses link the top of the tower to the spire, which is also crocketed; it contains lucarnes, and is topped by a weathervane.

=== Interior ===
The arcades are in five bays and consists of two-centred arches carried on octagonal columns. There are galleries on three sides of the church, carried on thin cast iron columns. In the south aisle is a wall monument to Thomas German who died in 1847. The tower is floored with decorative tiles that include an inscription referring to German's benefaction. The font dates from 1884.

== External features ==
The gate piers, gates, and wall of the former churchyard have been designated as Grade II listed building.

== See also ==
- Grade II* listed buildings in Lancashire
- Listed buildings in Preston, Lancashire
- List of Commissioners' churches in Northeast and Northwest England
