= List of church restorations and alterations by Thomas Rickman =

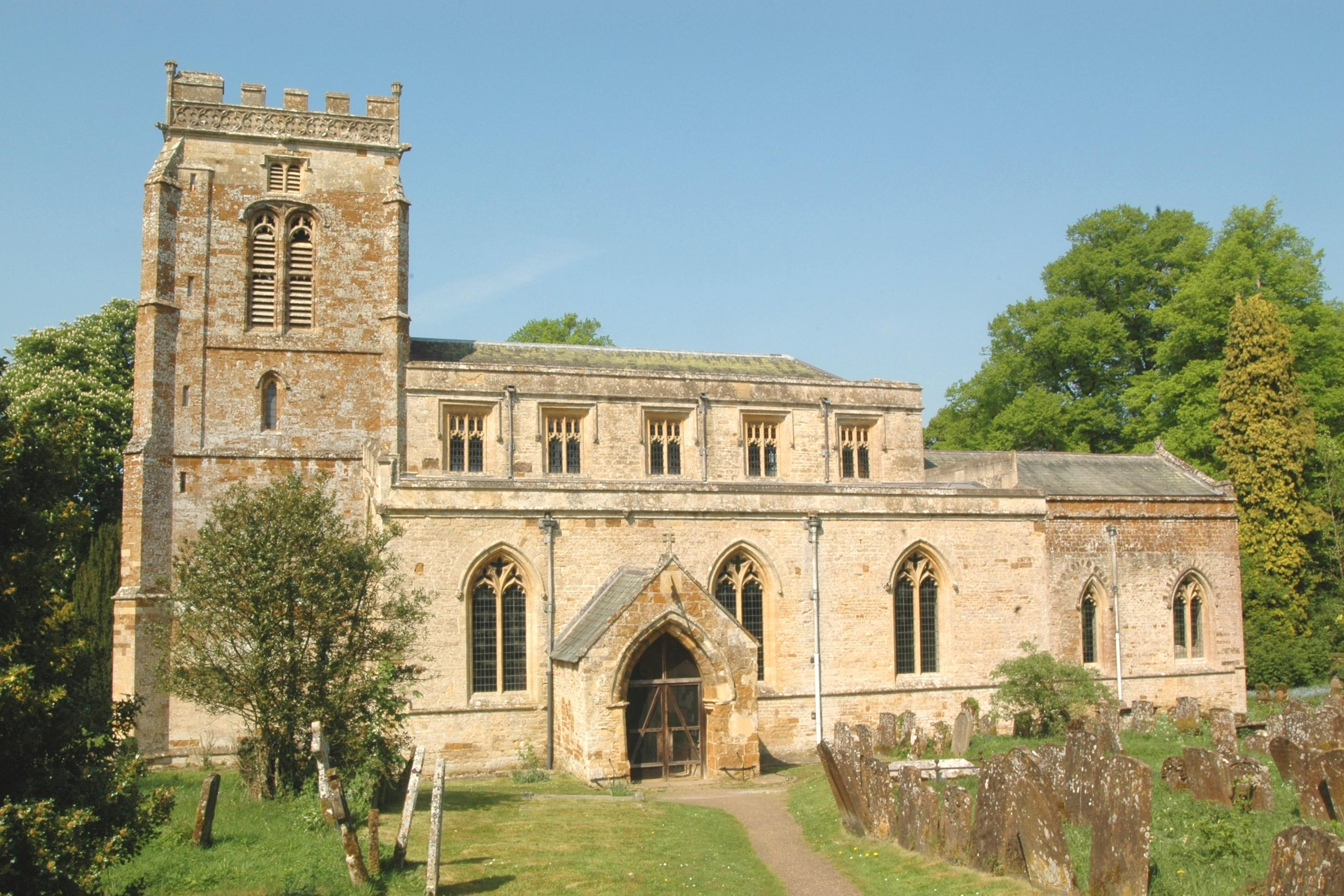
St Michael and All Angels' Church, Great Tew

Thomas Rickman (1776–1841) was a self-taught English architect who practised in Liverpool and Birmingham. His major output consisted of new churches, most of which were in Gothic Revival style. He also restored and made additions and alterations to churches, and worked on other designs, including country houses, public buildings, schools, and banks.

Rickman was born in Maidenhead, Berkshire. He trained in medicine and practised in Lewes, Sussex, from 1801 to 1803, but did not continue in this career, working in London with a corn factor, and then moving to Liverpool in 1808 to work as an insurance clerk. During this time he had begun to take an interest in Gothic architecture. While in Liverpool he met John Cragg, the owner of an iron foundry, and with him designed three churches. using cast iron for both their construction and decoration. He then worked with John Slater in the redesign of Scarisbrick Hall. In 1817 he opened an architectural office in Liverpool, and the following year he was joined by Henry Hutchinson, initially as a pupil, and from 1821 as a partner. Meanwhile, in 1817 he published the first edition of An Attempt to Discriminate the Styles of English Architecture. In this he divided English architecture into styles that have continued to be accepted since, namely Norman, Early English, Decorated, and Perpendicular.

Rickman then became involved with the Church Commissioners, designing, with others, a series of churches that have become to be known as Commissioners' churches, the first of his being St George's Church in Birmingham. He opened an office in that city in 1820, and moved there with Hutchinson the following year, where he spent the rest of his career. At about this time he was appointed as architect to Worcester Cathedral, and shortly after this he started work with Hutchinson on what was to become his major commission, New Court at St John's College, Cambridge. In 1830 he was elected to the Society of Antiquaries of London, thus acknowledging his acceptance into the profession. Hutchinson died in 1831, and during that year R. C. Hussey joined the practice, becoming a partner in 1835. Rickman died from liver disease in 1841.

This list contains details of restorations of churches, and of additions and alterations to churches, by Thomas Rickman.

== Key ==
Grade	Criteria
Grade I	Buildings of exceptional interest, sometimes considered to be internationally important.
Grade II*	Particularly important buildings of more than special interest.
Grade II	Buildings of national importance and special interest.
"—" denotes a work that is not graded.

Name	Location	Photograph	Date	Notes	Grade
St Mary's Church	Barnsley, South Yorkshire; 53.5554°N 1.4829°W		1822	Rickman added the body of the church to a tower dating from about 1400.	II*
St Mary's Church	Moseley, Birmingham, West Midlands; 52.4464°N 1.8867°W		1823–24	Alterations.	II
St James' Church	Hartlebury, Worcestershire; 52.3359°N 2.2352°W		1825	Rickman added the body of the church to a tower of 1587.	II*
St Leonard's Church	Bridgnorth, Shropshire; 52.5371°N 2.4187°W		1826	Rickman repaired the chancel. The church is now redundant and in the care of the Churches Conservation Trust.	II*
St Mary's Church	Handsworth, Birmingham, West Midlands; 52.5107°N 1.9193°W		1826	Added the southeast chapel as a mausoleum.	II*
St Michael and All Angels' Church	Great Tew, Oxfordshire; 51.9569°N 1.4205°W		1827	Restored.	I
St John the Baptist's Church	Hagley, Worcestershire; 52.4248°N 2.1180°W		1828	Added the north aisle and arcade to a church dating from the 13th century.	II*
St Mary Magdalene's Church	Clitheroe, Lancashire; 53.8742°N 2.3905°W		1828–29	Other than the tower and the east window, the rest of the church is by Rickman with Hutchinson; they also added a stage to the tower and the spire in 1844.	II*
St Mary's Church	Saffron Walden, Essex; 52.0248°N 0.2393°E		1831	With Henry Hutchinson, rebuilt the upper stage of the tower and added the spire.	I
St Mary's Church	Henbury, Bristol; 51.5063°N 2.6307°W		1836	Church restored and north chapel added.	II*
St Martin's Church	Horsley, Gloucestershire; 51.6807°N 2.2357°W		1838–39	Rickman rebuilt the body of the church, retaining the 15th-century tower.	II*
Church of the Holy Cross	Goodnestone, Kent; 51.2458°N 1.2293°E		1839–41	With R. C. Hussey rebuilt the nave, south porch, and chancel.	I

== See also ==
- List of new churches by Thomas Rickman
- List of non-ecclesiastical works by Thomas Rickman
