= St Peter's Church, Darwen =

Coordinates: 53.6955°N 2.4645°W

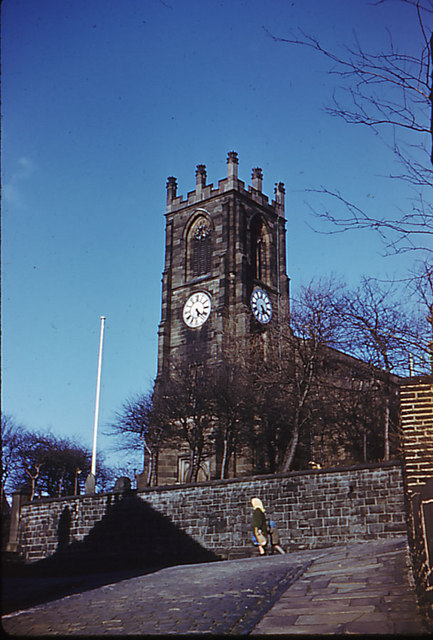
- St Peter's Church, Darwen, from the southwest

- Location in Blackburn with Darwen
- OS grid reference: SD 694,222
- Location: Bank Street, Darwen, Lancashire
- Country: England
- Denomination: Anglican
- Churchmanship: Liberal Catholic
- Website: St Peter, Darwen

History
- Former name(s): Holy Trinity, Darwen
- Status: Parish church
- Founded: 19 July 1827
- Dedication: Saint Peter
- Consecrated: 13 September 1829

Architecture
- Functional status: Active
- Heritage designation: II*
- Designated: 27 September 1984
- Architect(s): Thomas Rickman and Henry Hutchinson
- Architectural type: Church
- Style: Gothic Revival
- Groundbreaking: 1827
- Completed: 1829
- Construction cost: £6,786

Specifications
- Materials: Sandstone, slate roofs

Administration
- Province: York
- Diocese: Blackburn
- Archdeaconry: Blackburn
- Deanery: Blackburn with Darwen
- Parish: St Peter, Darwen

Clergy
- Vicar: Reverend Alison Mitchell

St Peter's Church (formerly Holy Trinity Church) is in Bank Street, Darwen, Lancashire, England. It is an active Anglican parish church in the deanery of Blackburn with Darwen, the archdeaconry of Blackburn, and the diocese of Blackburn. The church is recorded in the National Heritage List for England as a designated Grade II* listed building. It was a Commissioners' church, having received a grant towards its construction from the Church Building Commission.

== History ==
The church was built between 1827 and 1829 to a design by Thomas Rickman and Henry Hutchinson. A grant of £5,501 (equivalent to £520,000 in 2025) was given towards its construction by the Church Building Commission. The total cost of building the church was £6,786 (equivalent to £640,000 in 2025). The foundation stone was laid on 19 July 1827, and the church was consecrated on 13 September 1829. During the 2nd World War a young Don Estelle sang in the choir as a boy soprano, he later went on to appear in the hit 1970s sitcom It Ain't Half Hot Mum and had a number one in the UK Singles Chart with Whispering Grass. The original dedication was to the Holy Trinity, but this was changed to St Peter in 1972, when its parish was merged with two other parishes.

== Architecture ==
=== Exterior ===
St Peter's is constructed in sandstone with a slate roof. Its plan consists of a seven-bay nave and apsidal sanctuary in one cell with a clerestory, north and south aisles, north and south porches, a north vestry, and a west tower. Its architectural style is Perpendicular. The tower is in three stages, with buttresses, and a stair turret at the northwest corner. It has a west doorway, above which is a cinquefoil window. In the top stage are five-light louvred bell openings. The parapet is battlemented with eight flat-topped pinnacles. Along the sides of the church is a plain parapet. The windows in the clerestory have flat heads and three-lights with cinquefoil heads. Along the sides of the aisles are buttresses and transomed two-light windows with cinquefoil heads containing Perpendicular tracery. In the second bay on each side is a porch with an embattled gable. The apse contains three windows similar to those on the sides of the aisles.

=== Interior ===
Inside the church are seven-bay Perpendicular-style arcades carried on slim piers, and galleries on three sides. The west end has been partitioned under the gallery. The alabaster reredos dates from 1923 and is a memorial to the First World War. The stained glass in the central east window is by Shrigley and Hunt and dates from 1896. There is also a window by J. Holmes dating from the later part of the 19th century. The three-manual organ was built in 1887 by Jardine. It was cleaned and overhauled in 1910 by Norman and Beard. In 1934 it was rebuilt by Binns, Fitton and Haley. There is a ring of six bells, all cast in 1831 by William Dobson.

== See also ==
- Grade II* listed buildings in Lancashire
- Listed buildings in Darwen
- List of Commissioners' churches in Northeast and Northwest England
