= St Peter's Church, Spring Hill =

St Peter’s Church, Spring Hill
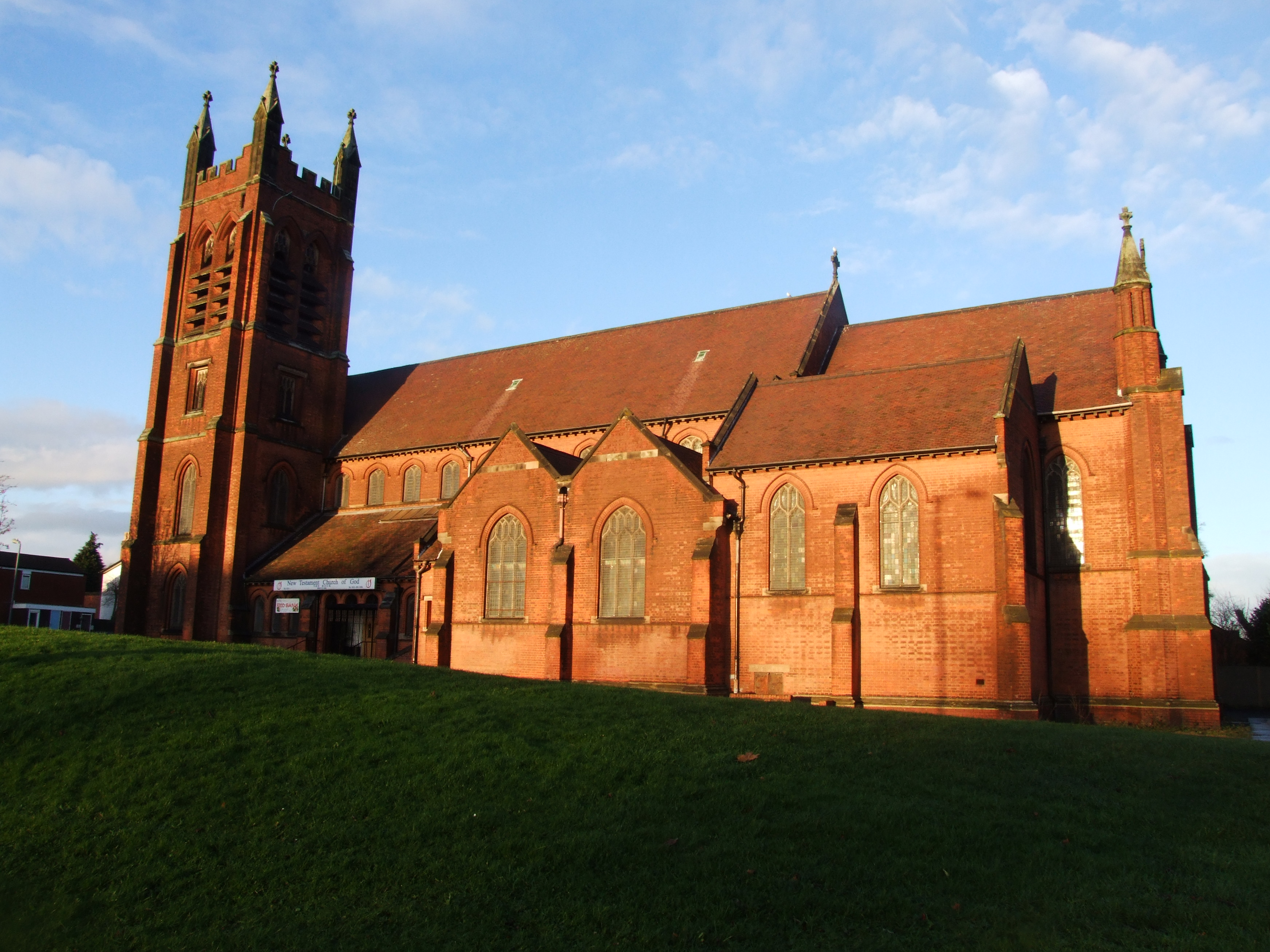
- St Peter’s Church, Spring Hill, now the New Testament Church of God the Rock
- St Peter’s Church, Spring Hill
- 52°29′8.39″N 1°55′20.46″W
- OS grid reference: SP 10151 80707
- Location: Birmingham
- Country: England
- Denomination: Pentecostal
- Previous denomination: Church of England
- Website: http://www.ntcgtherock.com

History
- Dedication: St Peter
- Consecrated: 19 July 1902

Architecture
- Architect: Frank Barlow Osborn
- Groundbreaking: 1901
- Completed: 1902
- Closed: 2001

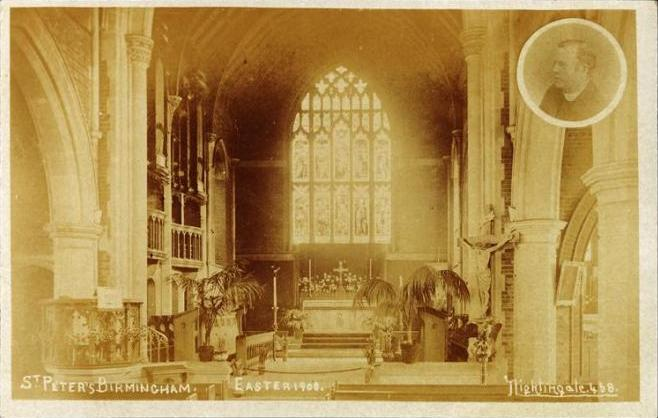
The interior, Easter 1908

St Peter's Church, Spring Hill is a Grade II listed former Church of England parish church in Birmingham.

== History ==
The first church dedicated to St Peter in Birmingham was built in Dale End and consecrated in 1827. This was closed in 1899 for demolition and the endowments transferred to a new church. The new church was built to designs by the architect Frank Barlow Osborn and was consecrated on Saturday 19 July 1902 by the Bishop of Worcester. A parish was assigned in 1902 from the parishes of All Saints' Church, Hockley and St Mark's Church, Ladywood.

When the church was closed in 2001 by the Church of England the parish merged with St John's Church, Ladywood and the building was sold to become the New Testament Church of God the Rock. It was registered with this name in January 2004.
