= Our Lady of Mount Carmel Church, Redditch =

Our Lady of Mount Carmel Church
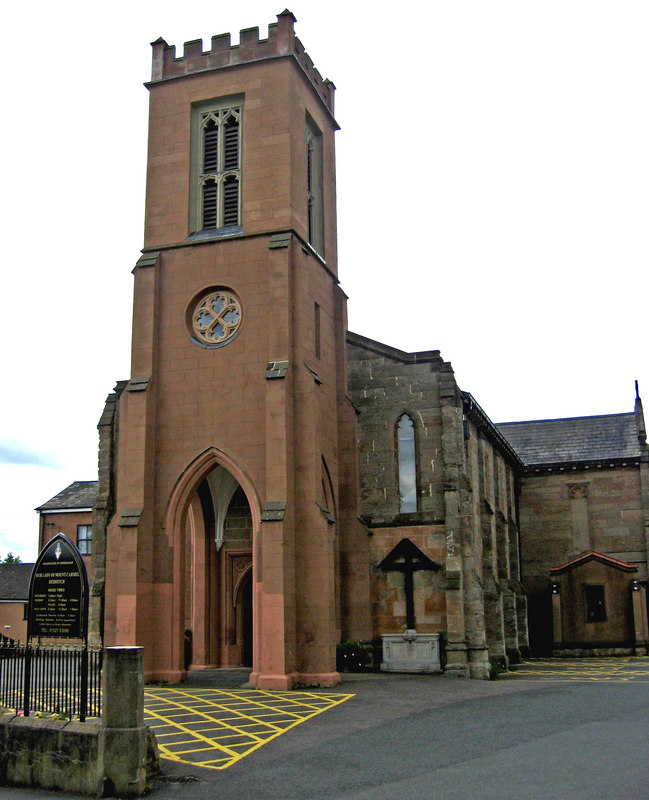
- Our Lady of Mount Carmel Church
- 52.3054°N 1.9317°W
- OS grid reference: SP 04754 67475
- Location: Redditch
- Country: England
- Denomination: Roman Catholic
- Website: OurLadyofMountCarmel.co.uk

History
- Status: Parish church
- Dedication: Our Lady of Mount Carmel

Architecture
- Functional status: Active
- Heritage designation: Grade II listed
- Designated: 10 April 1954
- Architect: Thomas Rickman
- Style: Gothic Revival
- Groundbreaking: 11 February 1833
- Completed: 24 April 1834

Administration
- Province: Birmingham
- Archdiocese: Birmingham
- Deanery: Kidderminster
- Parish: Our Lady of Mount Carmel

Our Lady of Mount Carmel Church is a Roman Catholic parish church in Redditch, Worcestershire, England. It was built from 1833 to 1834 and designed by Thomas Rickman in the Gothic Revival style. It is located between Beoley Road West and Holloway Lane in the town centre. It is a Grade II listed building.

== History ==
=== Construction ===
After the Reformation a Catholic mission was maintained around Redditch. At first the mission was in Beoley and supported by the Sheldon family. From 1783, the mission was at Chapel Farm in Heath Green. The current church's site was bought by a local noblewoman, the Lady Catherine Smythe. On 11 February 1833, the foundation stone was laid. The local priest, Fr Bruno Tunstall contributed to the building costs. The church is only the Catholic Church designed by Thomas Rickman. On 24 April 1834, the church was opened. In 1872, the church was restored. The work was done by Hardman & Co.

=== Developments ===
Initially, the parish was served by Benedictine priests from Downside Abbey. From 1948, the parish was transferred to the care of priests from Belmont Abbey, Herefordshire. They served the church until 1968, when the parish was handed over to the Archdiocese of Birmingham who continue to serve the congregation.

== Parish ==
Our Lady of Mount Carmel Church is its own parish. It has three Sunday Masses at 5:00pm on Saturday and at 8:15am and 6:00pm on Sunday.

== Exterior ==
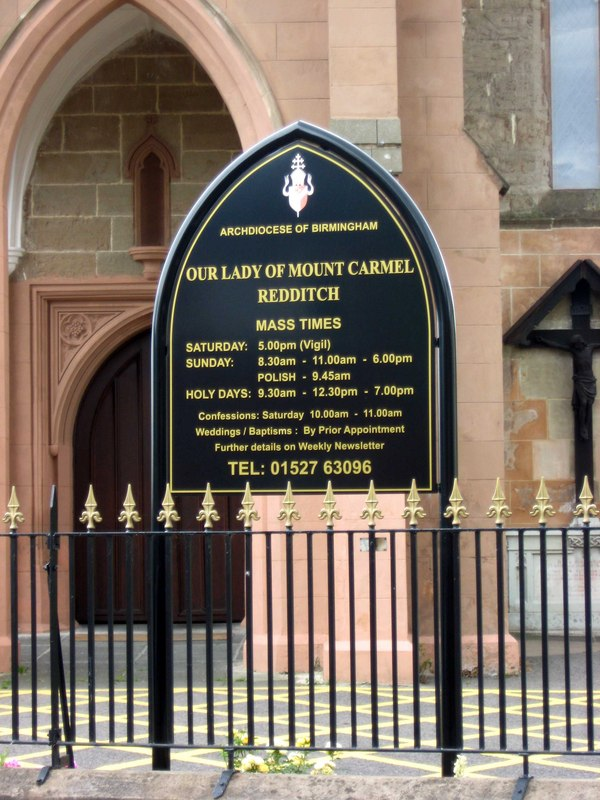
Sign

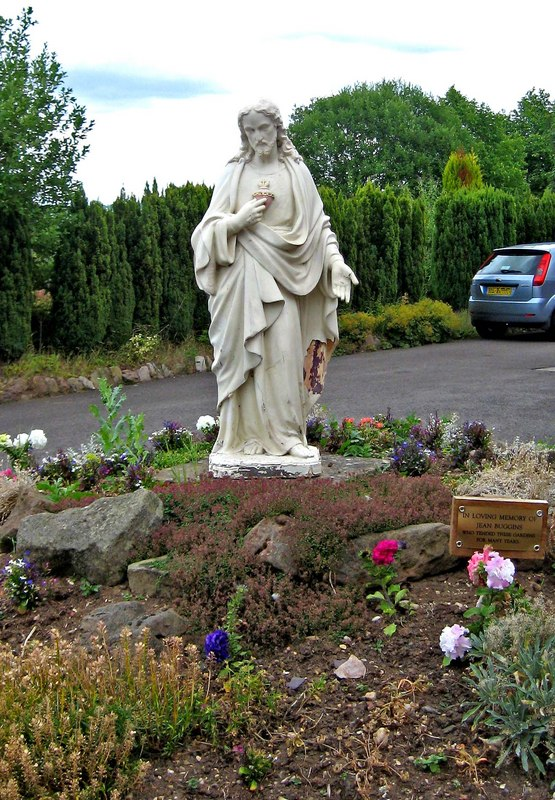
Statue of Jesus

== See also ==
- List of new churches by Thomas Rickman
