= Henbury Village Hall =

Building in Bristol, England

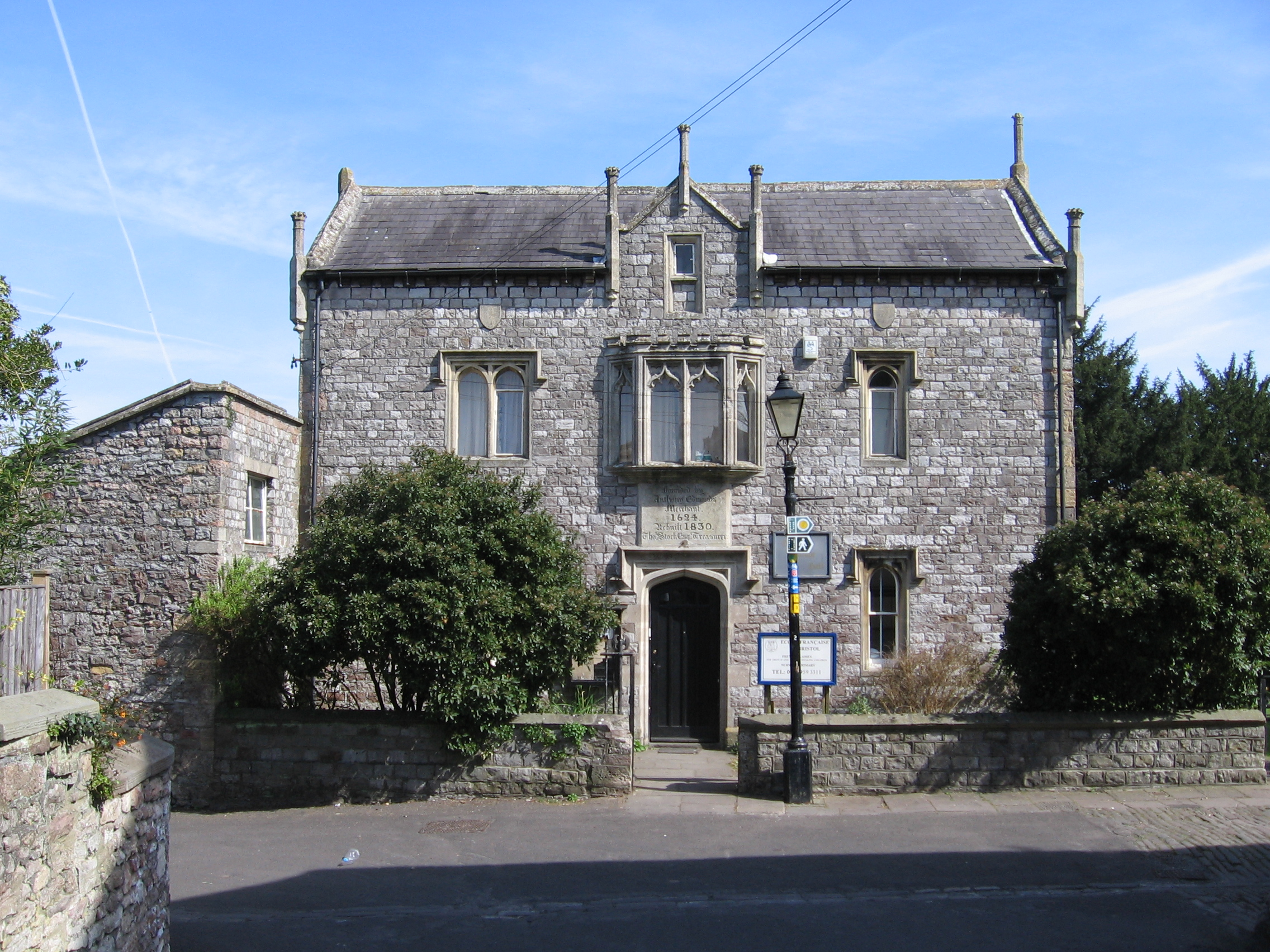

- Location within Bristol

General information
- Architectural style: Tudor Revival
- Location: Bristol, England
- Coordinates: 51.506853°N 2.631075°W
- Completed: 1830

Design and construction
- Architect: Thomas Rickman

Henbury Village Hall was built as a school in the Henbury area of Bristol, England.

It was built in 1830 in a Tudor Revival style by Thomas Rickman, on the site of a charity school which had stood on the site since 1601.

It has been designated by English Heritage as a grade II listed building.

== See also ==
- Grade II listed buildings in Bristol
