= St Matthew's Church, Cotham =

- St Matthew's Church, Cotham
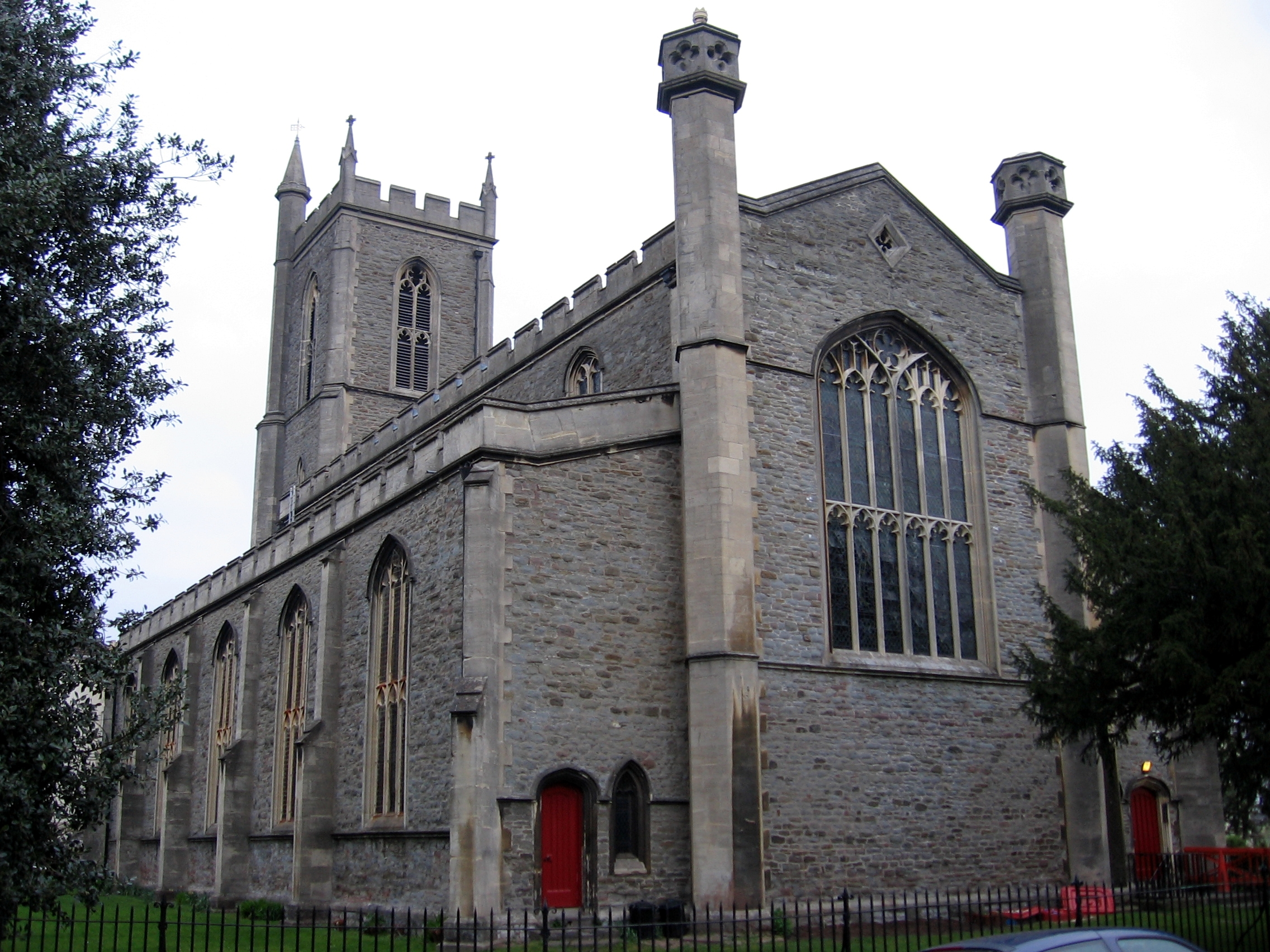
- St Matthew's Church, Cotham
- 51°27′51″N 2°35′42″W
- Country: England
- Denomination: Church of England
- Website: St Matthews Bristol

History
- Dedication: Matthew the Apostle
- Consecrated: 1835

Architecture
- Heritage designation: Grade II
- Designated: 1 November 1966
- Architect: Thomas Rickman
- Style: Gothic Revival

Administration
- Province: Canterbury
- Diocese: Bristol
- Parish: St Matthew and St Nathanael

St Matthew's Church, Cotham is a Gothic Revival building in the Cotham area of Bristol, England.

== History ==
The foundations of the church were completed between 1833–35 and designed by Thomas Rickman who was a major figure in the Gothic Revival. The church is now classed as a Grade II listed.

The roof is not visible and has an Aisle nave and West tower in the Gothic Revival style. The West front has a central four-stage tower with diagonal stone structures and an octagonal South-West stair turret.

== See also ==
- Churches in Bristol
- Grade II listed buildings in Bristol
