= St George in the Fields, Hockley =

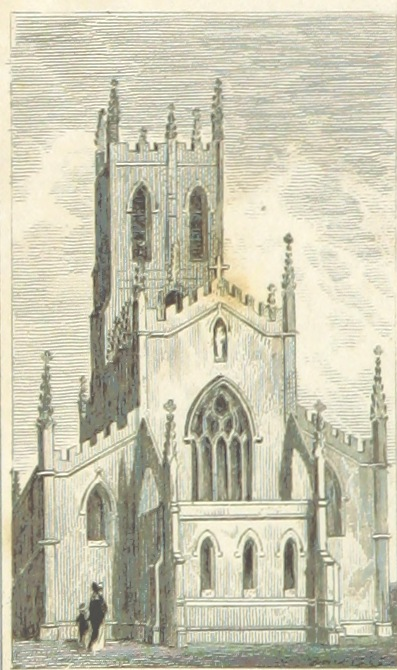
- St George in the Fields, depicted in an 1830 book
- St George in the Fields, Hockley
- 52°29′27.24″N 1°54′17.28″W
- Location: Birmingham
- Country: England
- Denomination: Church of England

History
- Dedication: St George
- Consecrated: 6 August 1822

Architecture
- Architect: Thomas Rickman
- Style: Decorated Gothic
- Completed: 1819
- Construction cost: £12,735
- Demolished: 1961

Specifications
- Capacity: 1,959 people

St George in the Fields, Hockley is a former Church of England parish church in Birmingham. Built in 1822, it was enlarged in the late 19th century and demolished in 1961. The tomb of architect Thomas Rickman remains a listed structure on the site.

== History ==
The church was the first of the Commissioner's churches in Birmingham. It was designed by Thomas Rickman in the Decorated Gothic style and built by Benjamin Nowell and Sons. It was consecrated on 6 August 1822 by the Bishop of Chester.

A parish was assigned out of St Martin in the Bull Ring in 1830. The church was enlarged in 1883 at a cost of £2,300 with the addition of a chancel and organ chamber by Bateman and Corser.

In 1856, part of its parish was taken to form the parish of St Matthias' Church, Farm Street, Birmingham.

The church was demolished in 1961.

== Tomb of Thomas Rickman ==
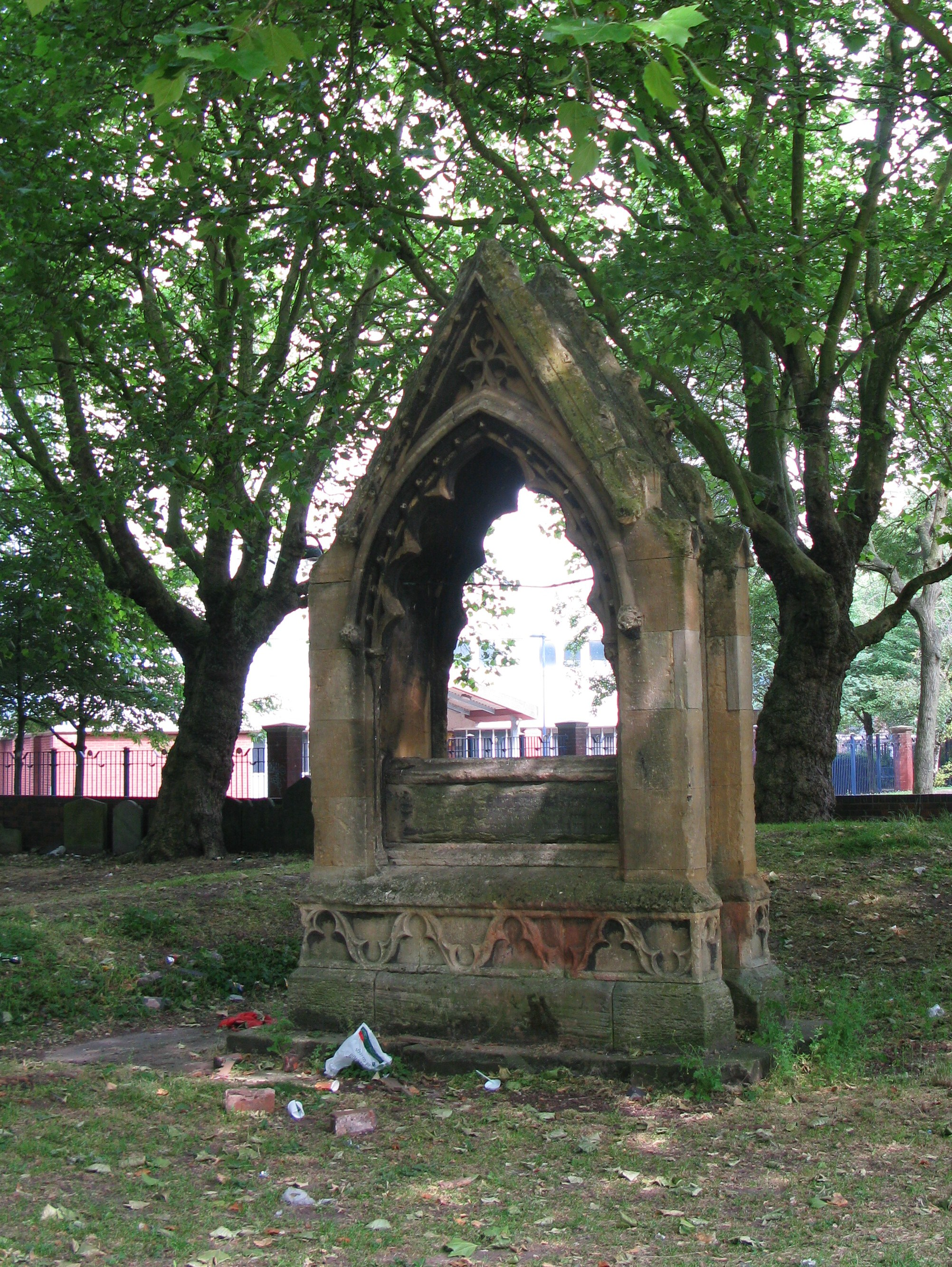
Tomb of Thomas Rickman

The church's architect, Thomas Rickman, was buried in the churchyard in 1841, and his tomb is now a listed structure.

== Organ ==
The church had a pipe organ by Elliott, later modified by Bishop & Banfield. The organ was rebuilt in a new organ chamber in 1883 by Nicholson and Ward of Walsall. A specification of the organ can be found on the National Pipe Organ Register.
