= Thomas Rickman =

English architect (1776–1841)

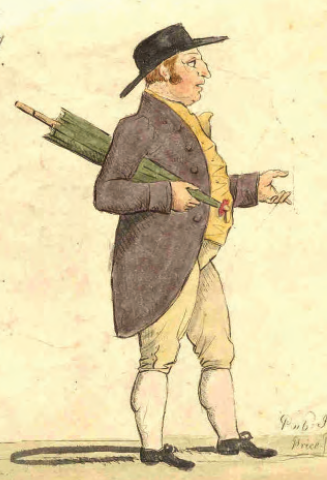
- sketch attributed to Charles Barber, c. 1819
- Born: 8 June 1776; Maidenhead
- Died: 4 January 1841 (aged 64); Birmingham
- Occupation: Architect, art historian
- Children: Thomas Miller Rickman
- Parent(s): Joseph Peters Rickman

Thomas Rickman (8 June 1776 – 4 January 1841) was an English architect and architectural antiquary who was a major figure in the Gothic Revival. He is particularly remembered for his Attempt to Discriminate the Styles of English Architecture (1817), which established the basic chronological classification and terminology that are still in widespread use for the different styles of English medieval ecclesiastical architecture.

== Early life ==
Rickman was born on 8 June 1776 at Maidenhead, Berkshire, into a large Quaker family. He avoided the medical career envisaged for him by his father, a grocer and druggist, and instead went into business for himself. He married his first cousin Lucy Rickman in 1804, a marriage that estranged him from the Quakers.

== Antiquarian activities ==
The failure of his business dealings in London and the death of his first wife left Rickman despondent: the long walks into the countryside that he took for his state of mind were the beginning of his first, antiquarian interest in church architecture. All his spare time was spent in sketching and making careful measured drawings, and classifying medieval architecture, at first through its window tracery, into the sequence that he labelled "Norman" "Early English", "Decorated English" and "Perpendicular English", names that have remained in use, which he was already employing in his diaries (Note: Rickman's diaries are conserved at the R.I.B.A. Library.) in 1811; he gained a knowledge of architecture which was very remarkable at a time when little taste existed for the beauties of the Gothic styles. In 1811 alone he is said to have studied three thousand ecclesiastical buildings. In September that year he gave the first of a series of lectures on medieval architecture at the small Philosophical Society of Liverpool, which he had joined. In around 1812 he wrote an essay on Chester Cathedral, which was published posthumously in 1864.

The first publication to appear during his lifetime was an article on Gothic architecture for Smith's Panorama of Arts and Sciences (Liverpool). This was separately published in 1817 as An Attempt to Discriminate the Styles of English Architecture from the Conquest to the Reformation, the first systematic treatise on Gothic architecture and a milestone in the Gothic Revival. It ran through many editions and provided the basis of Rickman's public reputation. He was elected a Fellow of the Society of Antiquaries in 1829.

Illustrations of the four styles of English architecture from Rickman (1817)
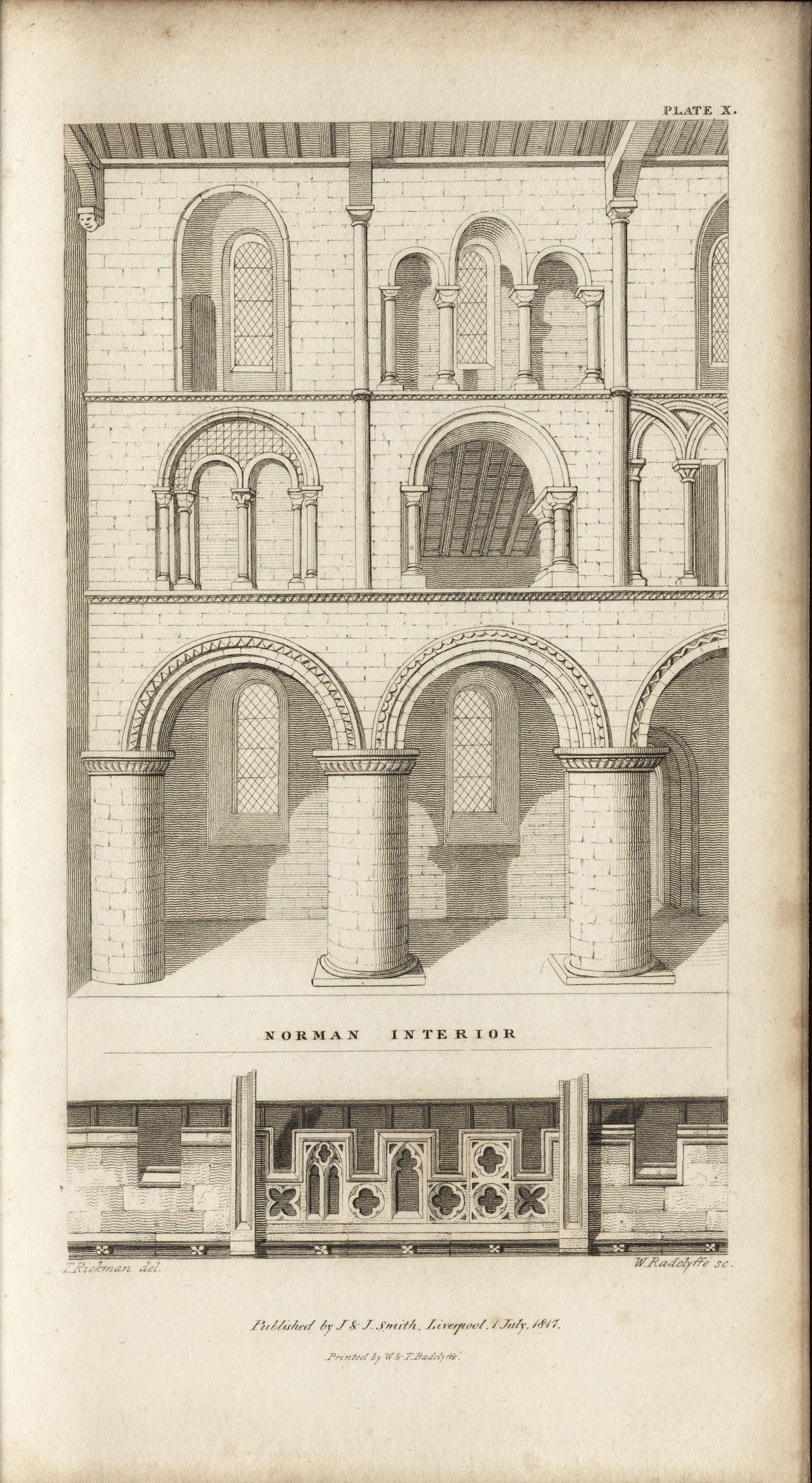
Norman

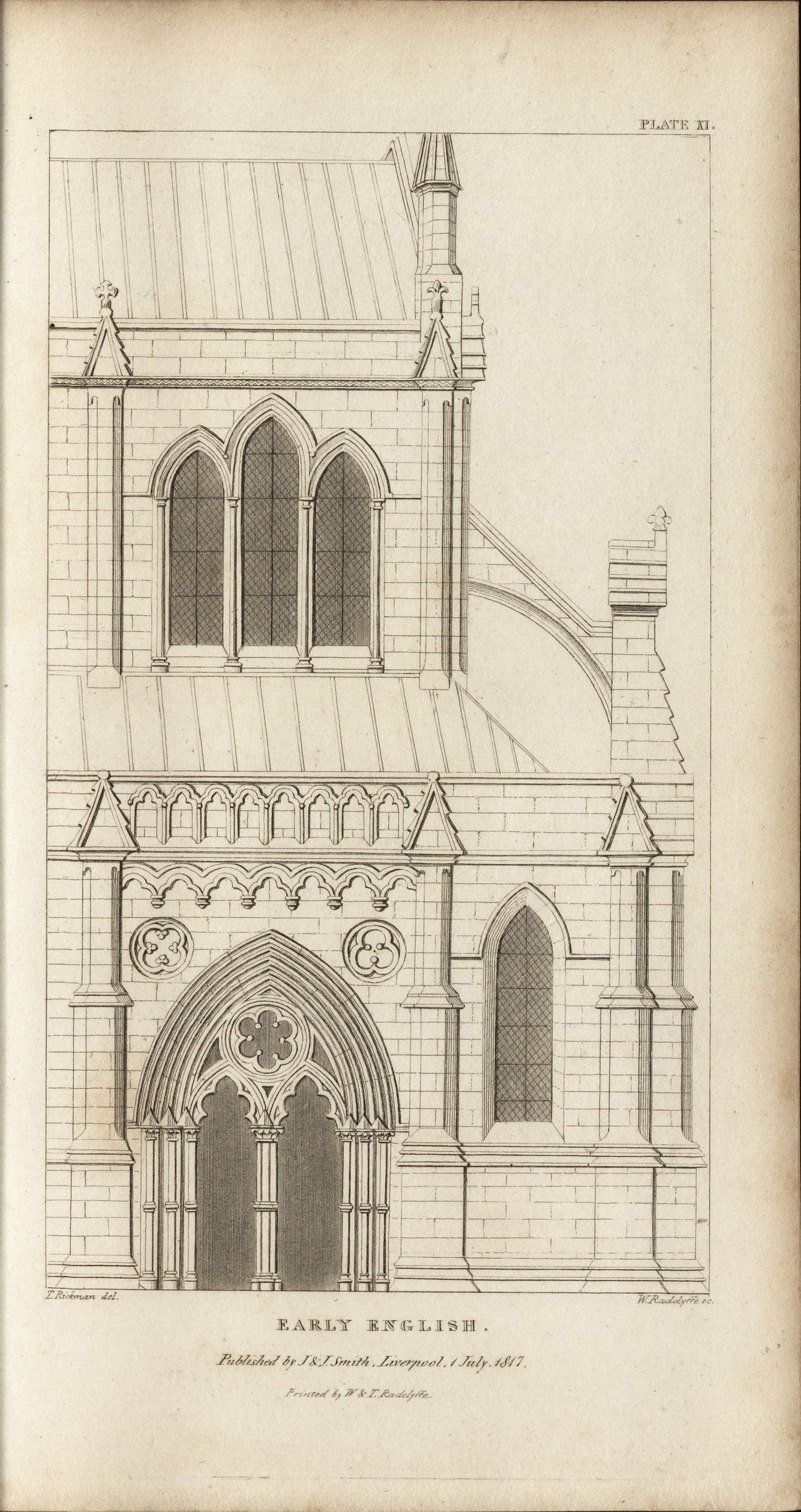
Early English

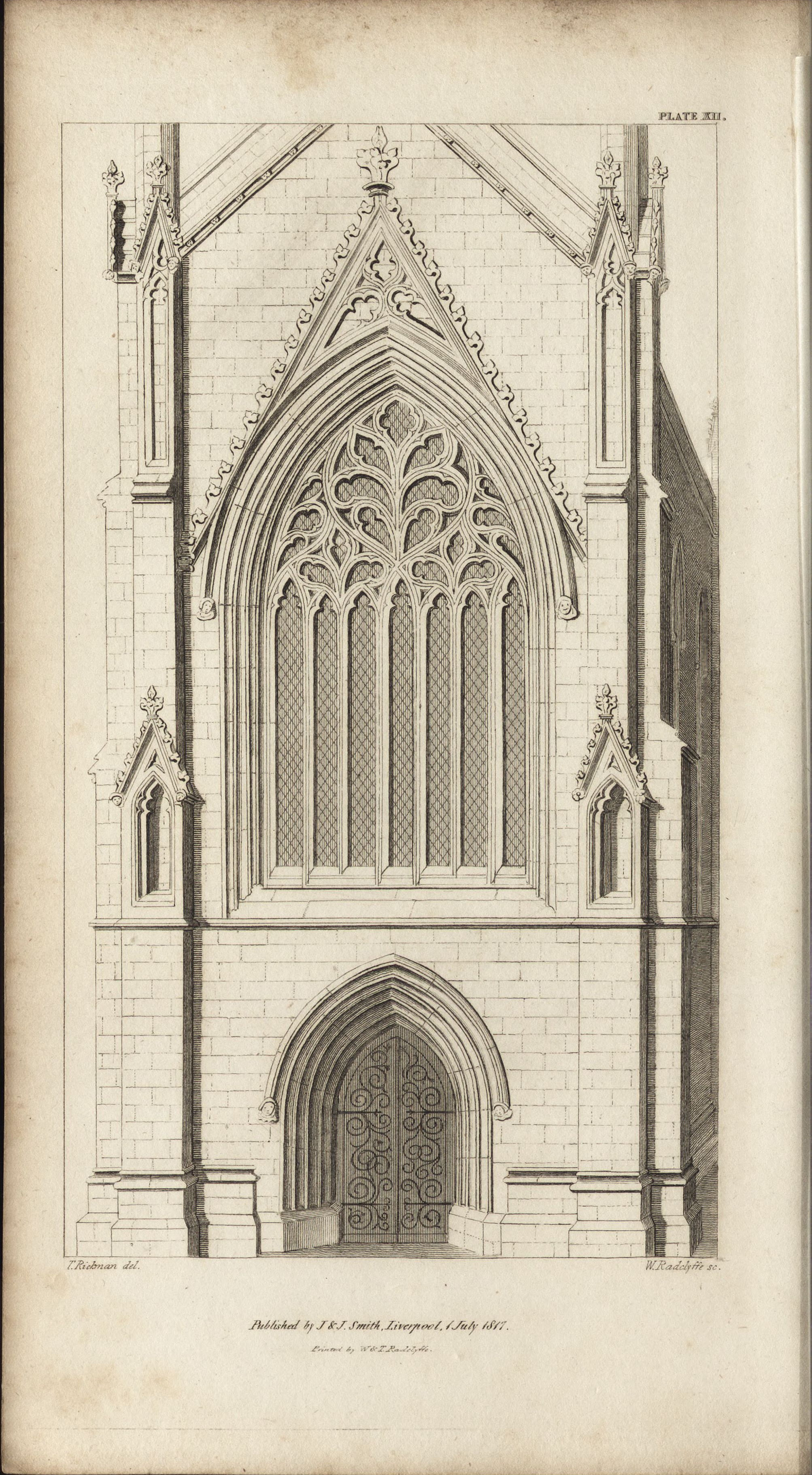
Decorated

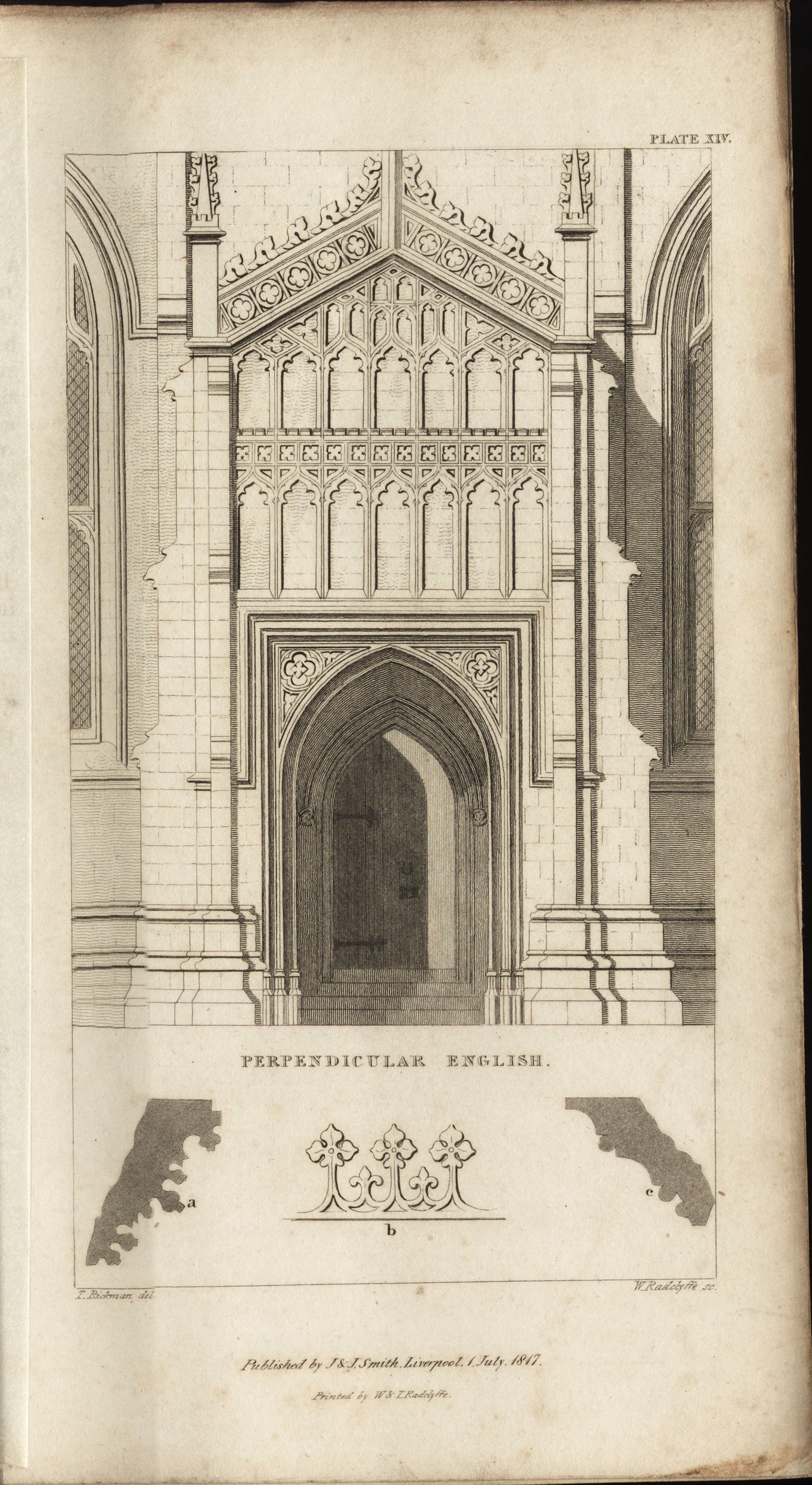
Perpendicular

== Rickman's architectural practice ==
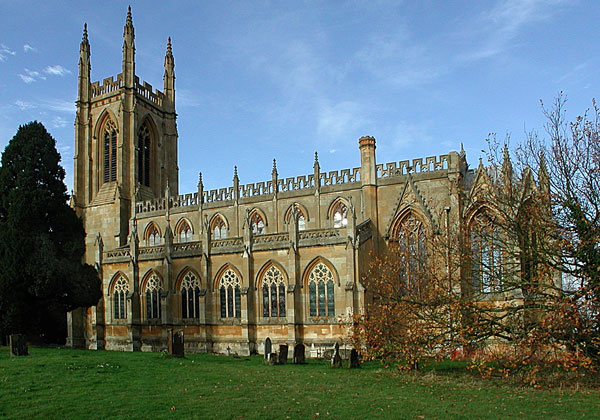
St Peter ad Vincula, Hampton Lucy is a Grade I listed building.

As an architect, Rickman was self-taught. In 1812 he met John Cragg an ironmaster based in Liverpool, and they collaborated on the design of three churches that made extensive use of cast iron: St. George's Church, Everton; St. Michael's Church, Aigburth; and St Philip's Church (since demolished) in Hardman Street.

When in the Church Building Act 1818 a large grant of money was set by the government to build new "Waterloo churches", Rickman sent in a design of his own which was successful in an open competition; thus he was fairly launched upon the profession of an architect, for which his natural gifts strongly fitted him. Rickman then moved to Birmingham where he designed St George's Church for the city. The church was completed in 1822 and demolished in 1960, but the churchyard gates remain. By 1830 Rickman had become one of the most successful architects of his time. He built churches at Hampton Lucy, Ombersley, and Stretton-on-Dunsmore, St George's at Birmingham, St Philip's, St Mary the Virgin and St Matthew's in Bristol, two in Carlisle, St Peter's and St Paul's at Preston, St David's in Glasgow, Grey Friars at Coventry, St Michael's Church, Aigburth and many others. He also designed New Court of St John's College, Cambridge, a palace for the bishop of Carlisle, and several large country houses.

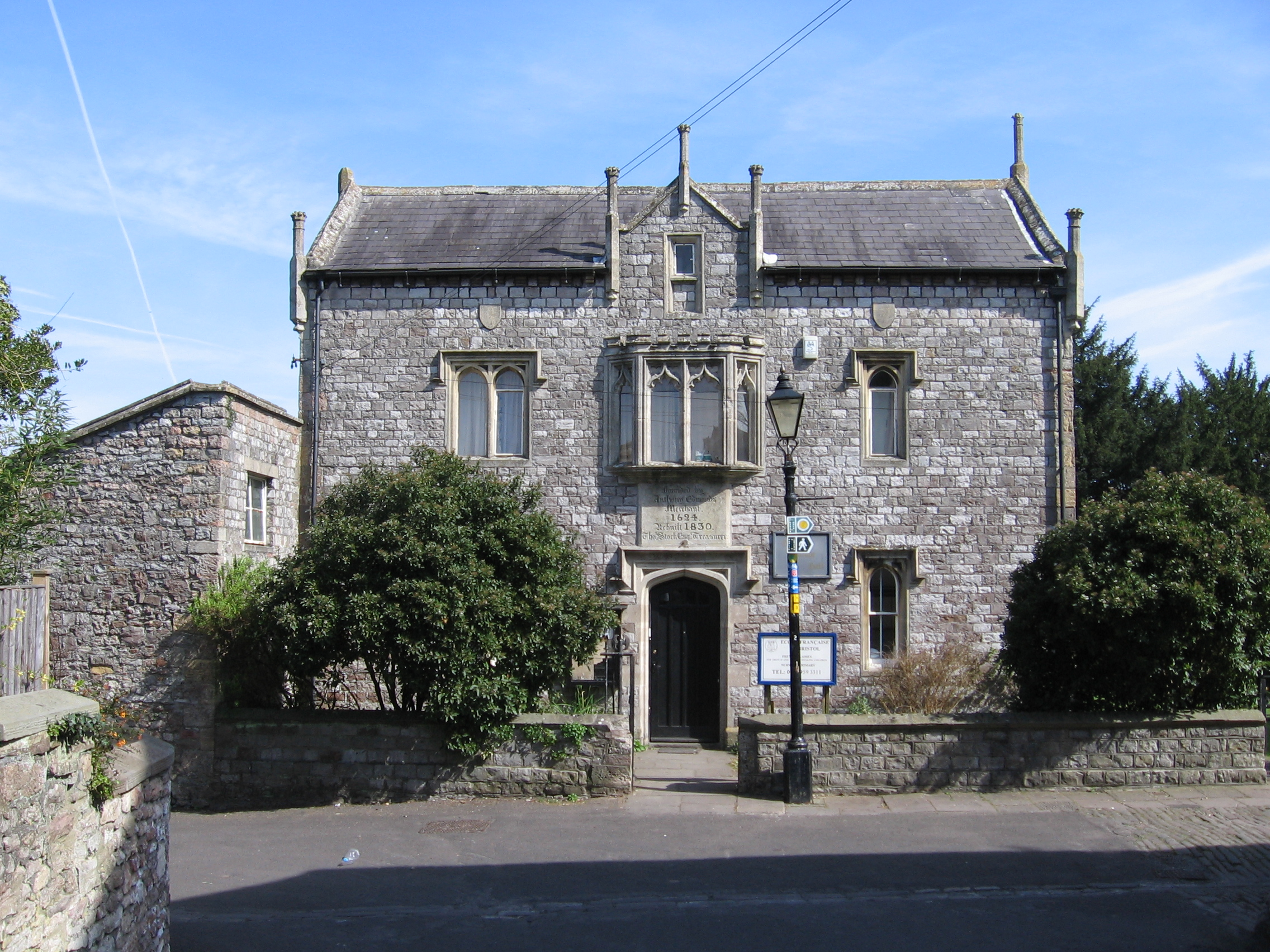
Rickman's Henbury School (1830) (now Henbury Village Hall)

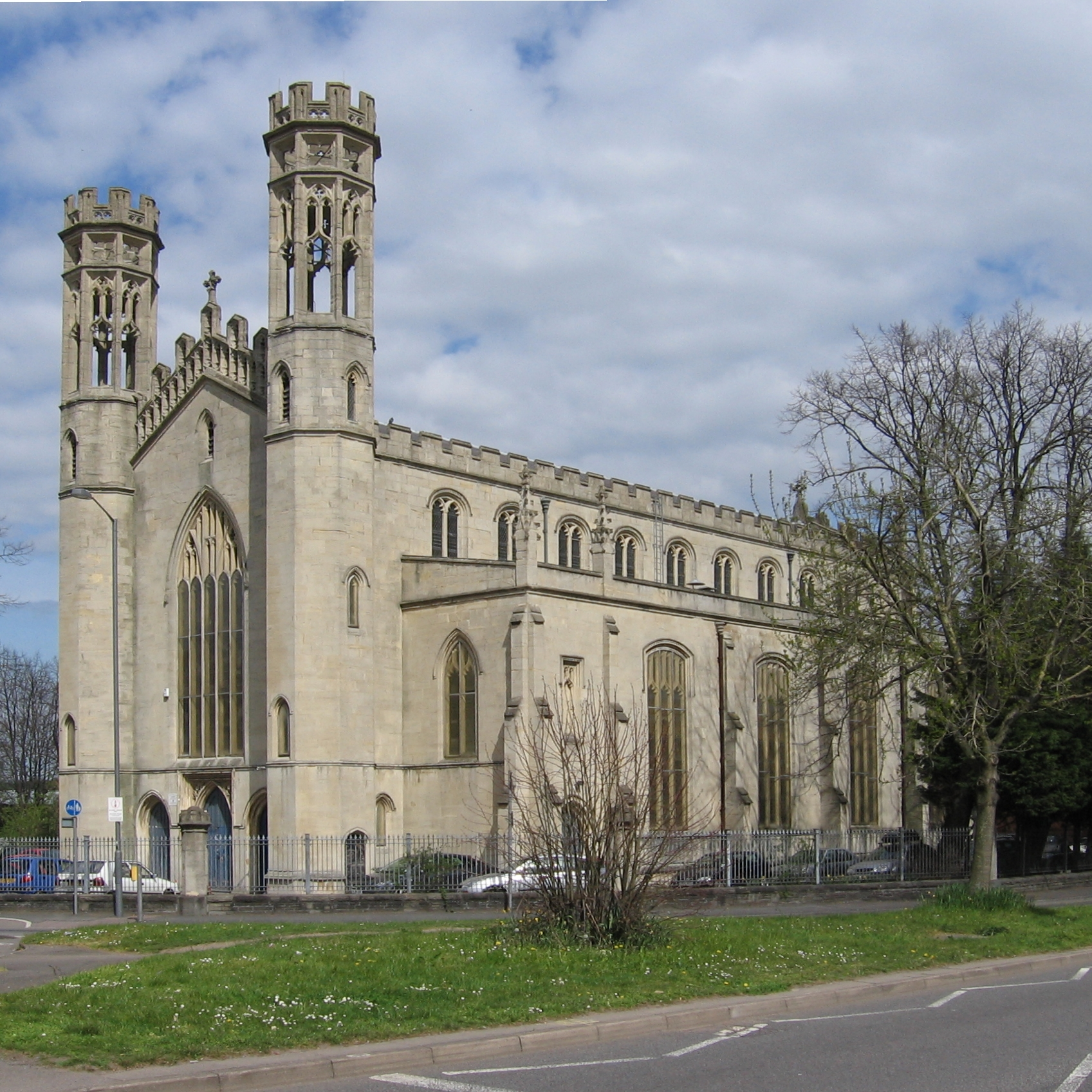
Holy Trinity, Bristol: one of Rickman's "Waterloo churches".

Rickman attracted a large share of the Church Building Commission's patronage in the new churches built in the West Midlands pursuant to the Church Building Act of 1818. Rickman's transitional Gothic style, that later designers looked down on as "Church Commissioners' Gothic", did not stand the more rigorous scrutiny of better-informed historicists in the age of photography. According to the Encyclopædia Britannica Eleventh Edition, "[his churches] are all in the Gothic style, but show more knowledge of the outward form of the medieval style than any real acquaintance with its spirit, and are little better than dull copies of old work, disfigured by much poverty of detail." A later, more generous critic, Sir Howard Colvin, has remarked "He was no ecclesiologist. If the detailing of his buildings was unusually scholarly, the planning remained Georgian, and the total effect of most of his churches is thin and brittle, if by no means unattractive." Rickman nevertheless played an important part in the revival of taste for medievalism, perhaps second only to Pugin.

Henry Hutchinson partnered with Rickman in December 1821 and formed a practice called Rickman and Hutchinson. Rickman remained in this practice until Hutchinson's death in 1831.

== Personal life ==
Rickman was married three times: first to his cousin, Lucy Rickman of Lewes; secondly to Christiana Hornor; and thirdly to Elizabeth Miller of Edinburgh, by whom he had a son, the architect Thomas Miller Rickman (1827–1912), and a daughter. He was a Quaker for most of his life. Though officially estranged after his first marriage, he continued to attend meetings, and was re-admitted prior to his second marriage. Late in his life, he became a member of the Catholic Apostolic (Irvingian) Church

== Death and burial ==
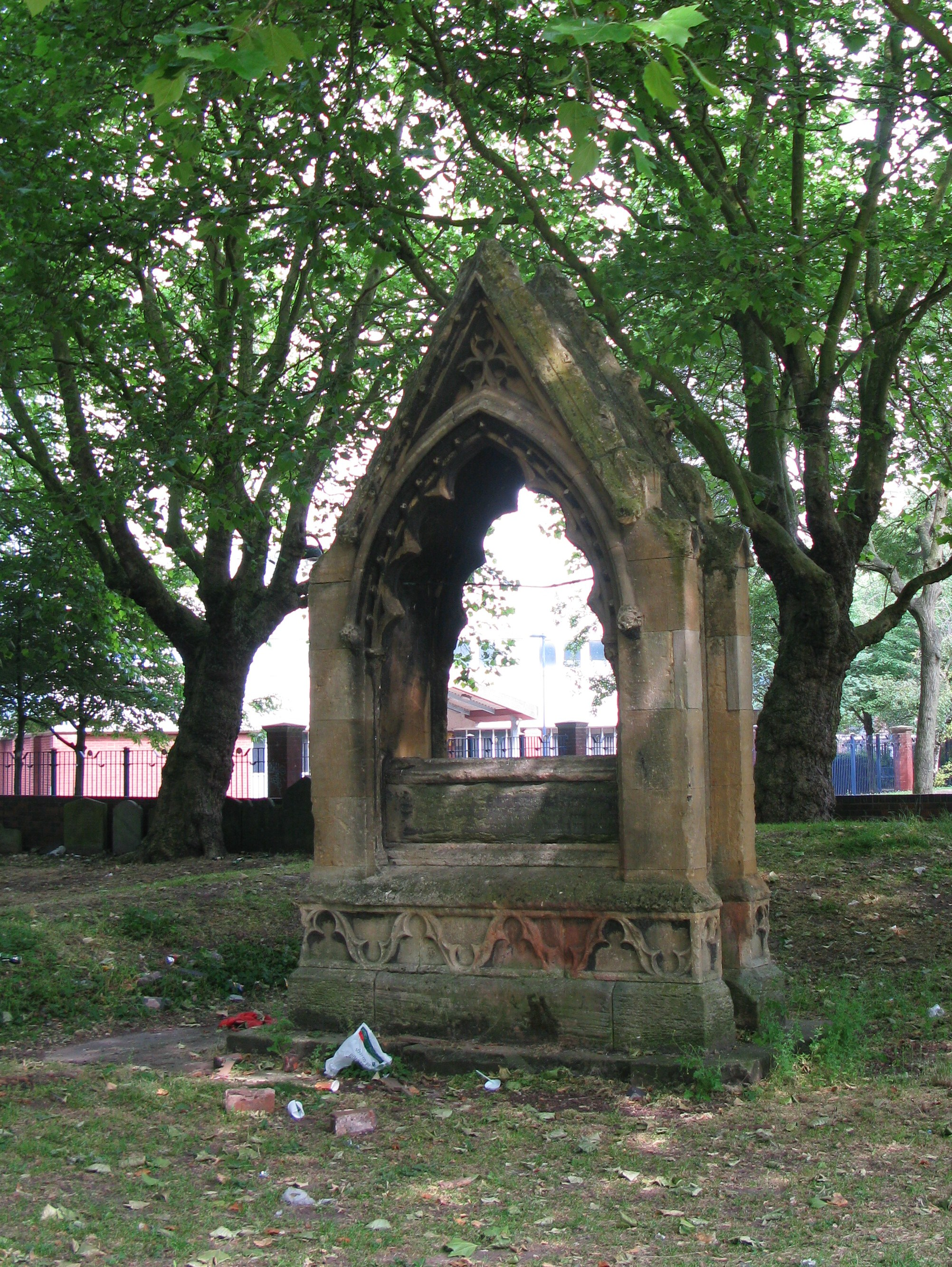
Tomb of Thomas Rickman in the former churchyard of St George in the Fields, Hockley

Rickman died at Birmingham on 4 January 1841. He was buried in the churchyard of the church he had designed: St George's Church. His tomb, designed by R. C. Hussey and completed in 1845, still stands, although the church does not.

== Major works ==
- St George's Church, Everton 1813
- St Michael's Church, Aigburth 1813
- Gwrych Castle, Abergele 1819–20
- Old Town Hall, Clitheroe 1820
- Church of St Thomas, Birmingham (war damaged 1940, now St. Thomas' Peace Garden) 1826–1829
- Bank for Birmingham Banking Company (later Midland Bank), Temple Row, Birmingham 1830.
- Holy Trinity Church, Lawrence Hill 1832
- Our Lady of Mount Carmel Church, Redditch 1834, his only Catholic church.
- Keeper's Lodge, Audley End, Essex 1835
- St Stephen's Church, Sneinton 1837
- Bishop Ryder Church, Birmingham 1838
- Rose Castle (alterations), Cumbria

== See also ==
- List of new churches by Thomas Rickman
- List of church restorations and alterations by Thomas Rickman
- List of non-ecclesiastical works by Thomas Rickman

== Sources ==
- Howard Colvin, 1993. A Biographical Dictionary of British Architects 1600–1840 3rd ed.
