= Henry Hutchinson =

British architect

Henry Hutchinson (16 October 1800 – 22 November 1831) was an English architect who partnered with Thomas Rickman in December 1821 to form the Rickman and Hutchinson architecture practice, in which he stayed until his death in 1831. Hutchinson was born on 16 October 1800 in Ticknall, Derbyshire. He partnered with Rickman after he completed his studies under Rickman. Hutchinson has been described as being an architectural genius.

Hutchinson died on 22 November 1831 in Leamington Spa and was buried on the north side of St Peter ad Vincula Church, Hampton Lucy, which he had designed in 1822.

== Works ==
- St Peter's Church, Darwen
- St Thomas' Church, Birmingham (1825–27)
- St Peter ad Vincula Church, Hampton Lucy, Ombersley (1822-6)
- Birmingham Banking Company, Bennetts Hill, Birmingham (1830–31)
- Bridge of Sighs, Cambridge (1831)
- Holy Trinity Church, Lawrence Hill 1832
