= Holy Trinity Church, Burnley =

Coordinates: 53.7898°N 2.2571°W

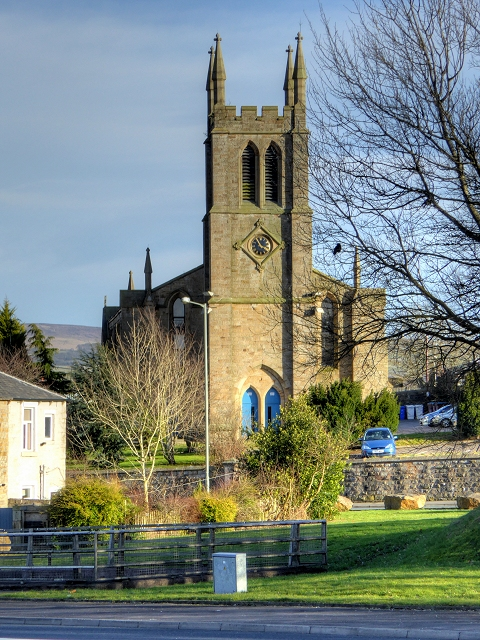
- Holy Trinity Church, Burnley, from the west

- Location in Burnley
- OS grid reference: SD 832 326
- Location: Accrington Road, Burnley, Lancashire
- Country: England
- Denomination: Anglican

History
- Status: Former parish church

Architecture
- Functional status: Redundant
- Heritage designation: Grade II
- Designated: 29 September 1977
- Architect: Lewis Vulliamy
- Architectural type: Church
- Style: Gothic Revival (Early English)
- Groundbreaking: 1835
- Completed: 1872
- Closed: 1990

Specifications
- Materials: Sandstone, slate roofs

Holy Trinity Church is in Accrington Road, Burnley, Lancashire, England. It is a redundant Anglican parish church, and is recorded in the National Heritage List for England as a designated Grade II listed building. Holy Trinity is a Commissioners' church designed by Lewis Vulliamy in Early English style. The church was extended in 1871–72, but closed in 1990, and has been converted into flats.

== History ==
Holy Trinity was a Commissioners' church, the Church Building Commission awarding a grant of £1,168 towards the cost of its construction. Its total cost was £2,918. The church was designed by Lewis Vulliamy and was built in 1835–36. The chapelry district of Holy Trinity, Habergham Eaves was assigned in 1843. In 1871-72 the chancel was enlarged and a vestry was added, probably by William Waddington. The church was declared redundant on 1 January 1990. By the following year it was derelict, having been damaged in a fire, but it was restored and converted into flats in 1993. Its benefice has been united with that of St Matthew, Burnley.

== Architecture ==
The church is constructed in punch-dressed sandstone ashlar, and has slate roofs with inserted skylight windows. Its architectural style is Early English. The plan consists of a four-bay nave without aisles, a two-bay chancel with a north chapel and a south vestry, and a west tower. The tower is in three stages, with clasping buttresses, and contains paired west doorways, a clock face in a diamond-shaped surround, and pairs of louvred bell openings. At the top of the tower is an embattled parapet with octagonal corner pinnacles, and there are more pinnacles at the angles of the nave. The bays of the nave are separated by buttresses, and each bay contains a corbel-table and a pair of lancet windows. The sides of the chancel also contain paired lancet windows, and the east window consists of a triple stepped lancet in a blank arch. The north chapel is gabled, and contains a wheel window. The interior has been remodelled, but originally it contained a three-sided gallery on cast iron columns.

== Appraisal ==
Holy Trinity Church was designated as a Grade II listed building on 29 September 1977. Grade II is the lowest of the three grades of listing and is applied to buildings that are "nationally important and of special interest". Hartwell and Pevsner in the Buildings of England series comment that the church has a "sturdy quality" and "an impressive sheerness".

== See also ==
- List of Commissioners' churches in Northeast and Northwest England
- Listed buildings in Burnley
- Places of worship in Burnley
