= St Andrew's Church, Burnley =

Coordinates: 53.8021°N 2.2352°W

- Parish Church of St Andrew with St Margaret and St James, Burnley
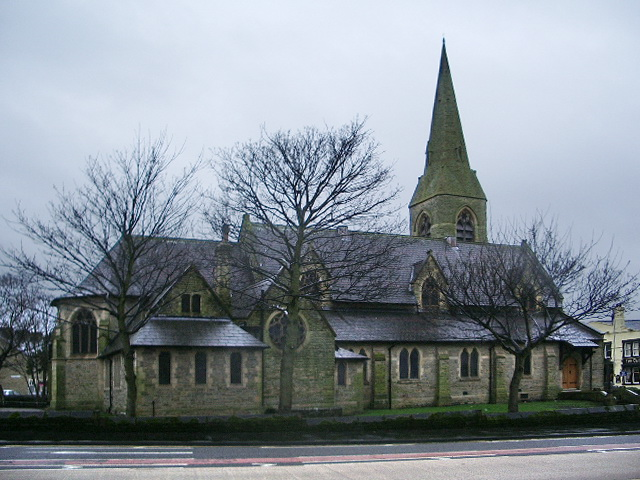
- St Andrew's Church, Burnley, from the northeast

- Location in Burnley
- OS grid reference: SD 846 340
- Location: Colne Road, Burnley, Lancashire
- Country: England
- Denomination: Anglican
- Website: St Andrew, Burnley

History
- Status: Parish church

Architecture
- Functional status: Active
- Heritage designation: Grade II
- Designated: 29 September 1977
- Architect(s): J. Medland Taylor; Austin and Paley (restoration)
- Architectural type: Church
- Style: Gothic Revival
- Groundbreaking: 1866

Specifications
- Materials: Sandstone, slate roof

Administration
- Province: York
- Diocese: Blackburn
- Archdeaconry: Blackburn
- Deanery: Burnley
- Parish: Burnley St Andrew with Burnley St Margaret and Burnley St James

Clergy
- Vicar: The Revd Fr Aiden J A Edwards B A (Hons)

St Andrew's Church is in Colne Road, Burnley, Lancashire, England. It is an active Anglican parish church in the deanery of Burnley, the archdeaconry of Blackburn, and the diocese of Blackburn. Its benefice is united with those of St Margaret, Burnley, and St James, Burnley. The church is recorded in the National Heritage List for England as a designated Grade II listed building.

== History ==
The church was built in 1866–67 to a design by J. Medland Taylor. The district chapelry of Saint Andrew, Burnley was assigned in 1869. It was restored in 1898 by the Lancaster architects Austin and Paley, and a baptistery was added during the 20th century.

== Architecture ==
St Andrew's is constructed in sandstone with slate roofs, in Gothic Revival style. Its plan consists of a nave with a west baptistery, north and south aisles, a chancel with a polygonal apse, a north vestry, a south chapel, and a southwest steeple. The tower has three stages, with a west door, a clock-face, and two-light bell openings. On its summit is a broach spire with four lucarnes. At the west end of the nave is a four-light window and a quatrefoil. Along each side of the nave are two half-dormer windows. The north aisle is in four bays, each with a two-light window; the south aisle has three bays with two two-bay windows and one three-bay window. The windows in the vestry and the chapel all have two lights, and the apse has three three-light windows. Inside the church is an open timber roof. The reredos, and almost all the stained glass, is by Kempe.

== See also ==
- Listed buildings in Burnley
- List of ecclesiastical works by Austin and Paley (1895–1914)
- Places of worship in Burnley
