= St Matthew's Church, Burnley =

Coordinates: 53.7837°N 2.2546°W

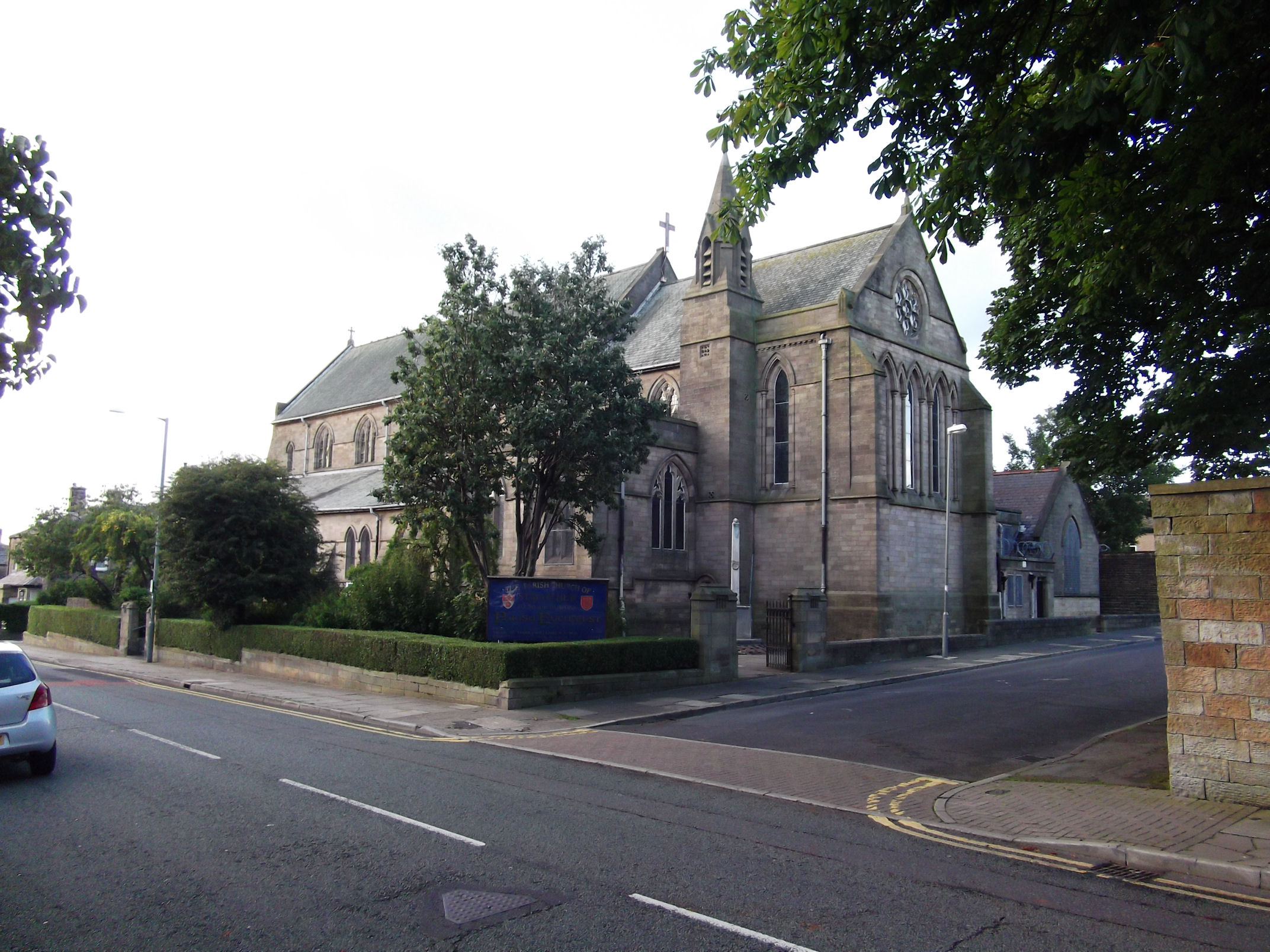
- St Matthew's Church, Burnley, from the South-East

- Location in Burnley
- OS grid reference: SD 83321 31959
- Location: St Matthew Street, Burnley, Lancashire
- Country: England
- Denomination: Anglican
- Churchmanship: Liberal Catholic
- Website: http://www.stmatthewsburnley.com

History
- Status: Parish church
- Founded: 7 October 1876
- Consecrated: 1 November 1879

Architecture
- Functional status: Active
- Architect(s): William Waddington, Henry Paley
- Architectural type: Church
- Style: Gothic Revival
- Groundbreaking: 1876
- Completed: 1931

Administration
- Province: York
- Diocese: Blackburn
- Archdeaconry: Blackburn
- Deanery: Burnley
- Parish: Burnley (Habergham Eaves) St. Matthew the Apostle with Holy Trinity

Clergy
- Vicar: Revd Alex Frost

St Matthew's Church is in St Matthew's Street, Burnley, Lancashire, England. (Note: Some sources use different names for the church. The church's own website uses "St Matthew with Holy Trinity Habergham Eaves Church". The official Church of England website uses "St Matthew The Apostle, Habergham Eaves".) It is an active Anglican parish church in the diocese of Blackburn. The original church was built between 1876 and 1879, and was designed by William Waddington and Sons. This burnt down in 1927 and was replaced by the present church. In the 1970s St Matthew's joined with the neighbouring Holy Trinity Church.

== History ==
St Matthew's was designed by William Waddington and Sons, and built between 1876 and 1879. The Lancaster firm of architects Paley and Austin had taken part in the competition for the design, but had been unsuccessful. Miss Halsted of Hood House laid the foundation stone on 7 October 1876. The church was consecrated on 1 November 1879 by the Bishop of Manchester. It contained stained glass windows designed by Kempe and Burne-Jones.

Vestments, lighted candles and birettas, in the Anglo-Catholic tradition, were used until the 1880s, but caused disquiet in the diocese. The Bishop of Manchester refused to allow the parish to have an assistant curate until the incumbent had made assurances about the church's position. The use of two altar candles and an adherence to Anglican liturgy is still reflected in the worship at the church.

In 1924 electric lighting was installed. On Christmas Day 1927 the church was destroyed by fire caused by the electrics, leaving only the walls standing; it was rebuilt between 1929 and 1931 supervised by Henry Paley of Austin and Paley, the successor in the Lancaster practice. The work cost £14,093 and provided seating for 620 people. The rebuilt church was opened by the Bishop of Blackburn. The longest serving vicar of the church was Revd F. Jones who served between 1923 and 1945. In the 1970s St Matthew's integrated with Holy Trinity Church.

== Architecture ==
The church is designed in the style of the 13th century, with a turret at the southwest corner. The stained glass includes a window dating from 1951 by Harry Stammers. There are also two windows by Henry Harvey. The original pipe organ of 1880, designed by Jardine of Manchester was destroyed in the fire. It was replaced by a three-manual organ which had been built in 1920 for a church in Farnworth by Alexander Young, also of Manchester. This was moved to Burnley and rebuilt in St Matthew's in 1933 by Laycock and Bannister of Cross Hills.

== Present day ==
St Matthew's is an active Anglican parish church in the deanery of Burnley, the archdeaconry of Blackburn, and the diocese of Blackburn. Its benefice has been combined with that of Holy Trinity, Burnley forming the benefice of Burnley (Habergham Eaves) St Matthew with Holy Trinity. It holds services on Sundays, and during the week. Associated with the church are groups of Scouts, Guides, and the Mothers' Union.

== See also ==
- List of ecclesiastical works by Austin and Paley (1916–44)
- Places of worship in Burnley
