= Places of worship in Burnley =

List of places of worship

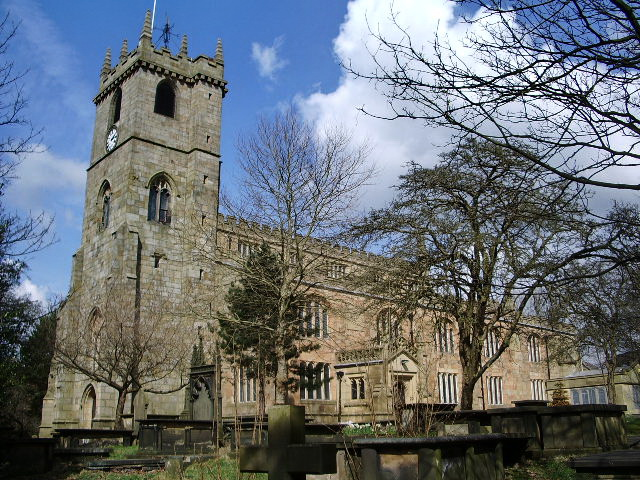
St Peter's Church, Church Street

Burnley, in Lancashire, England, has a long history of religious worship, dating from at least before 1122 in the case of the St Peter's Church. The chapel at Towneley Hall was the centre for Roman Catholic worship in Burnley until modern times. Well before the Industrial Revolution, the town saw the emergence of many non-conformist churches and chapels. In 1891 the town was the location of the meeting which saw the creation of the Baptist Union of Great Britain and Ireland. In the late 19th century a Jewish synagogue was established, and in recent times evangelical and free churches have appeared, as well as a large purpose-built mosque.

The 2001 census for Burnley gives a religious make-up of 74.5% Christian, 6.6% Muslim, 0.3% Hindu and 11.0% "No religion". Records are held for at least 77 places of Christian worship in Burnley. These include churches of the following denominations: fourteen Anglican, seven Baptist, five Congregational (now United Reformed Church), one Independent, one Independent Methodist, one Jehovah's Witness, twenty-five Methodist, one the Church of Jesus Christ of Latter-day Saints (LDS Church), one New Jerusalem, four Particular Baptist, seven Roman Catholic, one Scottish Baptist, one Spiritualist, one Unitarian, seven United Methodist Free Church.

The largest place of worship in Burnley is at Life Church Lancashire, on Sycamore Avenue (formerly the Gannow Baths). Life Church completed their new building, with a 500-seater auditorium, in November 2014.

The town has a total of 17 religious building or structures which are designated as listed buildings – all Grade II by English Heritage.

== Anglican churches ==
=== St Peter’s ===
St Peter's Church, around which the town developed, is the oldest of the town’s churches. The present structure dates from the 15th century and has been designated a Grade II* listed building by English Heritage. St Peter's lies close to the banks of the River Brun. There was a church on the site prior to 1122, but this was largely rebuilt in the 1530s by Thomas Sellars and Nicholas Craven. The oldest part of the church, the lower portion of the tower, dates from the 15th of 16th centuries. In 1735 a western gallery was added to accommodate the growing population of Burnley. The south aisle was rebuilt in 1789, and the north aisle in 1802. An upper part was added to the tower in 1803 and interior restoration work was undertaken in 1854 by Miles Thompson who built the nave arcades and clerestory. The chancel was enlarged in 1872—1873.

=== St Andrew’s ===
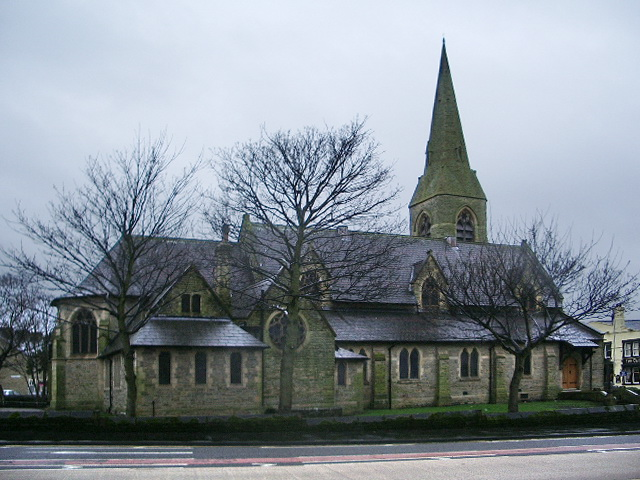
St Andrew's Church, Colne Road

St Andrew's Church on Colne Road was built in 1866–67 to a design by J. Medland Taylor, and was restored in 1898 by the Lancaster architects Austin and Paley. Its benefice is united with those of St Margaret, Burnley, and St James, Burnley. The church has been designated by English Heritage as a Grade II listed building.

A baptistery was added during the 20th century. The reredos, and almost all the stained glass, is by Kempe. St Andrew’s serves a mixed area in north Burnley varying from extremely deprived terraced housing to 1970's private housing.

=== St Matthew’s ===
St Matthew's Church, located in St Matthews Street, was built between 1876 and 1879, and was designed by William Waddington and Sons. On Christmas Day 1927 the church was destroyed by fire, leaving only the walls standing. Its rebuilding, between 1929 and 1931, was supervised by Henry Paley of Austin and Paley.

In 1835 the church began as a Mission School in Back Lane (Rossendale Road), Habergham Eaves. One hundred and fifty years later, in 1985, it took in the parish of Holy Trinity. The church has an open policy for baptism and marriage, under Anglican guidelines, and anyone who is a full member of any denomination may make their communion there.

=== St Catherine’s ===
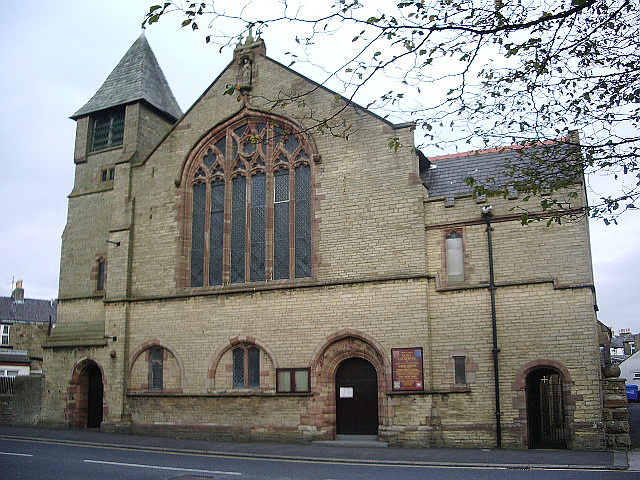
St Catherine's Church, Todmorden Road

St Catherine’s Church, on Todmorden Road, was founded in 1899. It does not have a graveyard. The parish priest is Father Roger Parker SSC. In 1895 the new church was planned to be called St Alban's, but when it opened in 1897 its name changed to St Catherine's.

St Catherine’s is a late Victorian Tractarian church with Byzantine features and a wrought iron Baldacchino. The stone-built church has a decorative brick interior and a wooden beamed ceiling without any internal columns, giving an unrestricted view of the High Altar. The Church contains a memorial to Victor Smith, VC. The Church has regular Heritage Open Days.

=== St Mark’s ===
St Mark’s Church on Owen Street was founded in 1909 and closed in 1965. It did not have a graveyard. A second St Mark’s, in Rossendale Road, was founded in 1965. It also does not have a graveyard.

=== St Stephen’s ===
St Stephen’s Church on Oxford Road was founded in 1865. It does not have a graveyard. In 1865 a mission started, and in 1870 a school and chapel were built.

=== St Cuthbert’s ===
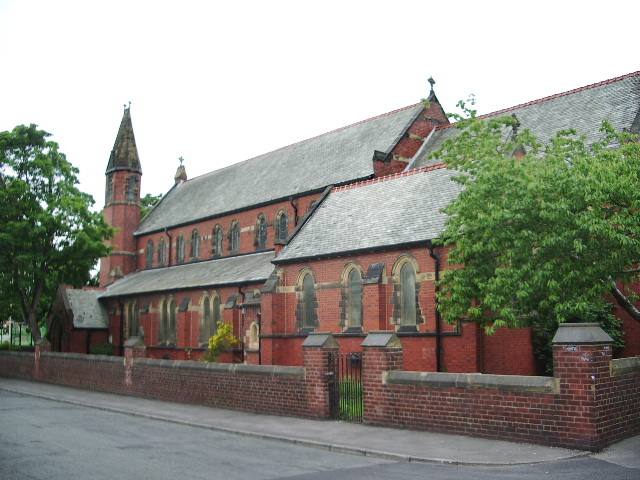
St Cuthbert's

St Cuthbert's Church on Towneley Street was founded in 1905. The church does not have a graveyard. In 1905 a Mission Hall opened on Towneley Street, and in 1906 the foundation stone for the new church was laid. In 1908 the church was consecrated.

The church supports Beavers, Cub Scouts, Scouts, Rainbows, Brownies and Guides. The Burnley District Explorer Scouts also meet at St Cuthbert’s on Friday evenings. The Mothers’ Union meets once a month, and the Burnley Lane Fellowship of Churches Luncheon Club meets every Tuesday. There is also a table tennis group and St Cuthbert’s Amateur Operatic and Dramatic Society meet weekly from June until November. Friday Friends meet once a month, and many outside groups use the church facilities. All religious services at the church are open to all.

=== All Saints with St John the Baptist’s ===
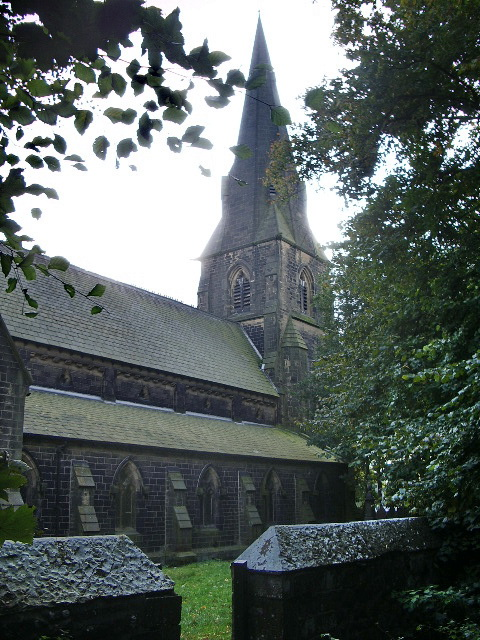
All Saints with St John the Baptist’s

The church of All Saints with St John the Baptist was built in 1845 by Sir James Kay-Shuttleworth of Gawthorpe Hall and John and James Dugdale of Lowerhouse. The graveyard closed in 1885. The church later united with St.John's Gannow to form West of Burnley Parish. The architects of the church, Weightman and Hadfield of Sheffield, were pioneers of the Gothic Revival style. The building cost £5,000, of which £3,000 came from the Dugdale family. The site itself and £1,300 was provided by the Kay-Shuttleworth family. On 17 November 1849 the church was consecrated by the Bishop of Manchester the Right Reverend James Prince Lee. The church has many interesting stained glass windows. The east window, the theme of which is Creation, was designed by the local artist Brian Clarke.

== Anglican churches now closed ==
=== St James’ ===
St James’ Church, on Bethesda Street, was founded in 1844 and moved in 1966 to March Street into a former workshop. The original church building was demolished in 1969 and the site made into a garden. It had a graveyard. The church was listed in the 1851 census as having been built in 1849. In 1869 the tower and spire were added. .

The tower and steeple of the church were listed Grade II. The tower has been described by English Heritage as being of coursed squared sandstone in a square planned perpendicular style. It had angle buttresses, a vice at the north-east corner, an offset to the belfry stage and an embattled parapet. The spire was splay-footed with lucarnes in the non-cardinal sides. The east side of the tower had a moulded Tudor-arched doorway which led to the former nave. The structure was de-listed on 14 September 2001.

In 1971 the church was demolished except for the tower and spire. In 1998 the tower and spire were also demolished to make way for a shopping complex. A history of the church is available in A hundred years at St.James, Burnley 1849-1949 by Edward L Driscoll (1949).

The second St James’ church, on March Street, was founded in 1966 and closed in 1998, when its benefice was merged with that of St Andrew’s. It did not have a graveyard.

=== Other Anglican churches ===
St Alban’s Church, on Stoneyhurst Avenue, was founded in 1959 and closed in 1982. It did not have a graveyard. In 1982 the church closed and combined with St Catherine's.

St John the Baptist’s Church, on Gannow Lane, was founded in 1868 and closed in 1981. The church had a large western tower, with a clockface, and had a graveyard. In 1868 a school was started at Wood Top, and in 1879 the church was founded. In 1892 a tower was added and a reredos installed. In 1979 the church was demolished, and the parish combined with All Saints, Habergham. There is still a Church Centre, however, at Gannow Lane.

St Margaret’s Church, on Abel Street, was founded in 1997 and closed in 1968. It did not have a graveyard. In 1969° the church was demolished.

St Oswald’s Church, on Ighten Road, was founded in 1910 and closed in 1980. It did not have a graveyard.

St Paul’s Church, on Saunder Bank, was founded in 1845 and closed in 1961. It did not have a graveyard. In 1848 the Sunday School started, and the 1851 census showed there was a school room licensed for worship prior to the erection of church. The church proper was built in 1853. When the church closed in 1961, the parish combined with St Catherine. In 1963 the church was demolished.

Holy Trinity Church, Accrington Road, Habergham Eaves (The Mitre), was founded in 1835 on land given by Robert Townley Parker. It was consecrated in 1836. In 1873 a chancel was added. In 1989 the church closed and the site converted into flats, with the parish combining with St Matthew's.

St Saviour’s Church, in Church Street, closed in 1954. It had begun in 1893 as a Protestant Association Mission Room in Chaffer's Yard. It then moved to a room above Carter's Surgery in Church Street. In 1898 a Gospel Protestant Mission Hall in Church Street was also formed, by a group from St Peter's Church, following a disagreement.

In the 1800s St Ayden Mission, for Holy Trinity, existed in Canal Street, Habergham Eaves, and later in Charlotte Street, Habergham Eaves. There was also the church of St Columba’s, on Hebrew Road (Duke Bar), but its dates are unclear.

== Roman Catholic churches ==
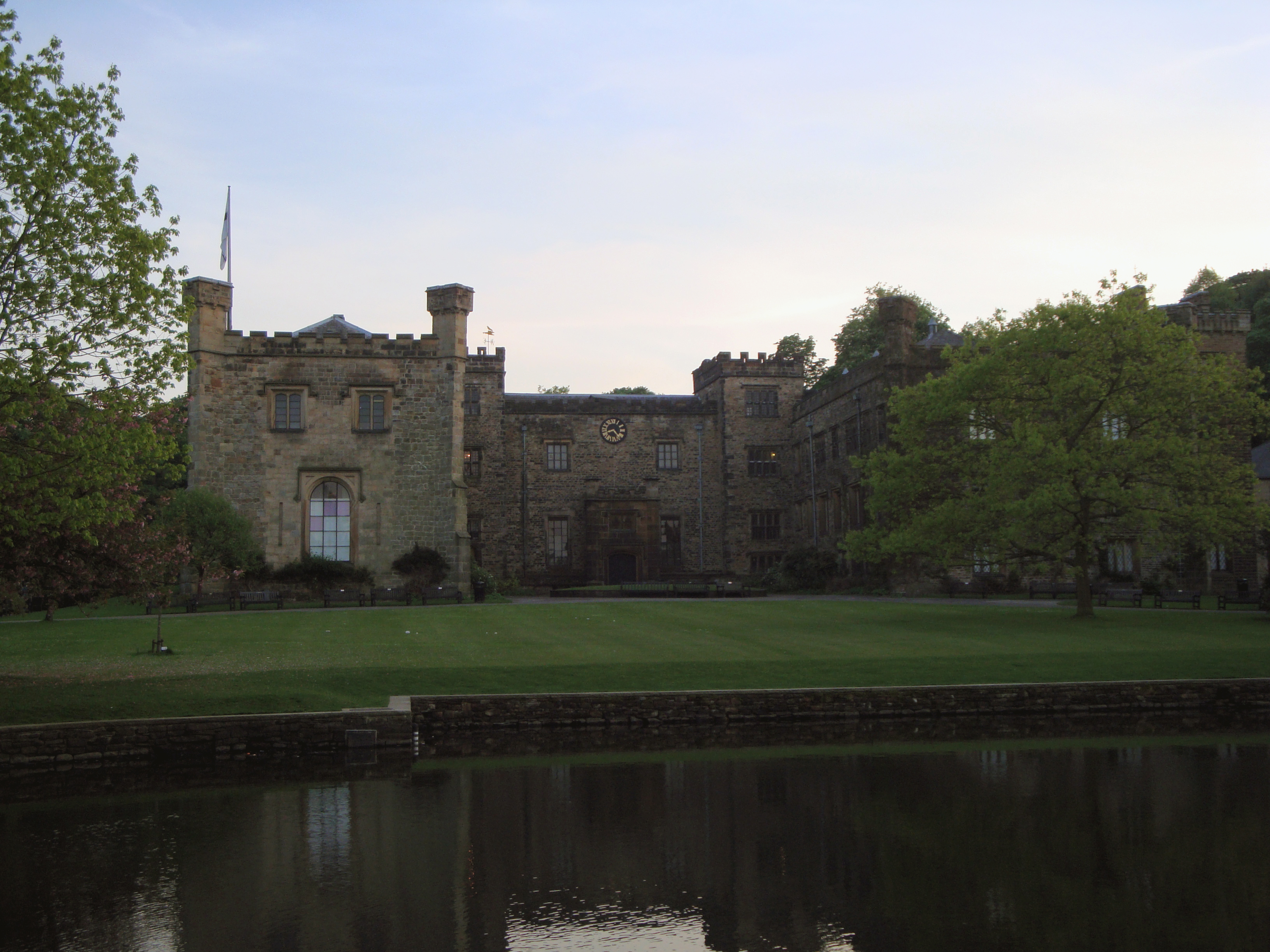
Townley Hall from the front

=== Towneley Chapel ===
One of the earliest parish priests, working before the 1730s, was Fr John Nutter who was probably born in Reedley Hallows. Together with his brother, he went to Rheims in 1579, to train as a seminary priest and was ordained in 1582. He was captured on landing back in England in January 1583, and was tried and executed on 12 February 1584, on the same day as George Haydock.

The chapel at Townley Hall, was founded before 1706 and closed in 1872, was the chief centre of Roman Catholic worship in Burnley until modern times. The Towneley family had kept a private chapel in medieval times, and for centuries had been connected with Whalley Abbey. During the reign of Queen Elizabeth I the family attended Mass in their bailiff's house. But they also provided for Mass in their private chapel, and the house became honeycombed with secret holes and hiding places. A seventeenth-century description of the hiding places at Towneley was published for the first time in 1923 when Lord Abingdon had forwarded it to the Mayor of Burnley. The document was printed in the Burnley Express on 1 August 1923. The Catholics of Towneley were of Jacobite sympathies at the time of the 1715 rebellion, as is shown by a register kept by Father Thomas Anderton, who lived at Towneley between 1705 and 1741, for almost the whole of his missionary life.

Peter Giffard, Vicar General of the North, was priest at the Hall from 1661 until his death in 1689. Father Anderton was Archdeacon of Lancashire in 1732, and Father George Kendal, who was also at Towneley for a time, was his successor in that office. Following the defeat of the Catholics in the Jacobite rising of 1745, Catholicism in Burnley saw a slow decline, and by 1774 Bishop Walton confirmed that there were only 39 to receive the sacrament. In 1784 Bishop Gibson confirmed there were only 25. The influx of the Irish workers to Burnley, from about 1800, however, saw numbers increase again. There was a first attempt in 1814 to build a new chapel, and another scheme was launched in 1817 to raise money, chiefly by subscription and to petition the Bishop for a priest. The chief local benefactors of the chapel were Peregrine Towneley (£1,000), John Witham (£200), Edward Lovat (£100) and Harry Eastwood (£50).

The chapel was built on land at Burnley Wood, given by the Towneley family, on what was then a country lane, Todmorden Road. When a new and larger St Mary's was built, the old chapel became the assembly rooms of the parish. Between 1811 and 1819 the district was led by French exile, Fr Louis Merlin. He was succeeded by Father Charles Lupton and shortly afterwards (for 25 years) by Fr Richard Hodgson, who later became a Canon of the Liverpool diocese. Beginning as a Sunday school in 1798, the Towneley family founded at Burnley one of the oldest schools in the diocese. It later became a day school. Pupils were given new clothes each year – the girls had green frocks and bonnets, and the boys had jackets and fustian trousers. About twice a year all the children dined with the family at the Hall. In 1845 Canon John Worthy came as curate and helped in the task of building a new and bigger church.

=== St Mary of the Assumption ===
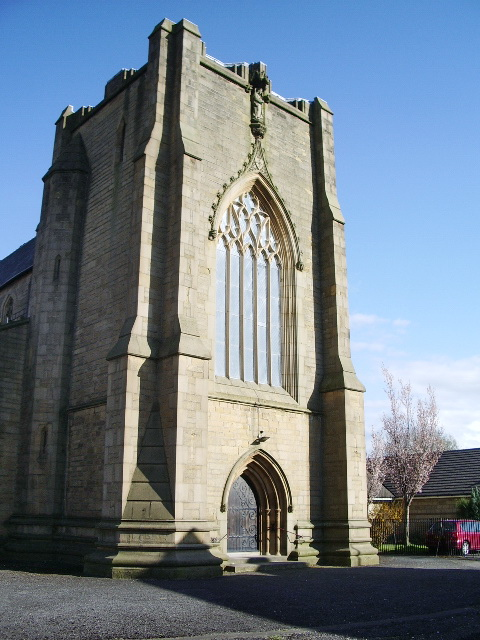
Tower of St Mary’s Roman Catholic Church, Yorkshire Street

St Mary of the Assumption Roman Catholic Church, on Yorkshire Street (formerly called East Gate), was built to designs by Weightman and Hadfield, which included a tall spire that was never built. The adjoining convent was founded in 1872 by the Sisters of Mercy. The church opened at the beginning of August 1849 amid scenes of pageantry and splendour, the entire church having been decked with flowers. Several bishops were present including Bishop Brown representing Lancashire, Bishop Briggs representing Yorkshire and Dr J Brown of Wales. Pontifical High Mass was celebrated after the singing of Terce, with an orchestral and choral setting of Haydn's Grand Mass No. 1. After the service over a hundred guests were given refreshment at the Bull Inn.

Fr Peter Hopkinson, formerly Rural Dean, is the parish priest at St Mary’s and is based at the Presbytery on Todmorden Road.

=== Christ the King ===
Christ the King Roman Catholic Church, on Healey Court, was founded in 1929. A chapel of ease of St Thomas had been established in 1876, and in 1929 Monsignor Tynan bought a house in Manchester Road to found a new parish to replace it. Fr Meagher was sent here to establish a separate parish, and Fr Watts and Fr Porter worked there for a time. After 1936, during the rectorship of Fr H. Bolger, improvements were made and a new church opened. The church does not have a graveyard.

=== St Augustine’s ===
The church of St Augustine’s, on Lowerhouse Lane, was founded in 1896. The parish of St Augustine's was formed from that of St John's, Padiham, in October 1896, with Fr Notterdam as the first parish priest. From September 1897, Holy Mass was celebrated at the unfurnished "The Cottage House”, the parish being called St Vincent's at that time. A plot of land was purchased in December 1897, and the present school chapel was opened in May 1898 by Bishop Bilsborrow. It was dedicated to St Augustine.

Lady O'Hagan donated a chalice, ciborium (still at the church) and the present statue of Our Lady. Fr Cahill took as priest over in 1904, but the parish, deemed to be too poor, was closed and made a chapel of ease to St Mary Magdalene's, Gannow. Fr Joyner then took over, but in 1908 the parish was closed again, with the chalice being sent to St Mary's Church. The buildings were put up for sale on two occasions. In 1908 Fr Bruning became parish priest and remained until 1914, having to leave because of his nationality at the outbreak of World War I. In 1915 Fr Hardman was made parish priest and built the present presbytery in 1922. He retired in 1938 and died in 1939 aged 80.

Fr Veale became parish priest in 1938. Under his guidance all of the parish’s debt was paid off, all property put in good repair, and all vestments and furnishings renewed. A new chalice was presented to the church by the crew of No 1 Gun, Howitzer Brigade, comrades of Joseph Stanley who had been killed in action in France in 1918. Fr Sheahan was parish priest in 1946, followed by Fr Houston in 1948. A new baptismal font was given to the parish by Fr Veale in October 1947.

=== St John the Baptist ===
St John the Baptist, on Bracewell Street, was founded in 1892. This mission was founded as St Saviour's. Fr Aukes, a Dutch priest set up a chapel over a blacksmith's shop. Bishop Vaughan laid the foundation stone for a two-storey school-chapel in 1893, and at the end of that year the chapel was opened by Archbishop Scarisbrick.

Between 1896 and 1902 there were three priests here for a short time. By 1901 the number of scholars had risen from about 160 to 380. Fr Shine (1902-1913) built a new house and a church in 1908, with the foundation stone laid by Bishop Casartelli.

=== St Mary Magdalene ===
St Mary Magdalene was founded in 1883 on Haslam Street. In 1980 it moved to a new church on Gawthorpe Road. Initially Sunday Mass was celebrated by the priest from St Mary's. The mission was made separate in 1887, by which time it had cost over £20,000, half of which had been provided by St Mary's and the Towneley Family. Fr Raymond, a Belgian priest, served from 1887 until his retirement in 1901. He added new infant schools. Between 1901 and 1914 the mission was in the charge of Fr Harrison, with a new church being built in 1904, together with a new presbytery, a men’s club and schools extension.

== Baptist churches ==
=== Aenon Chapel ===
The chapel is situated on Red Lion Street, and opposite Burnley Library which lies directly on the other side of Croft Street. The chapel was built in 1850-52 and was the work of local architect James Green of Portsmouth, near Todmorden. Green was also responsible for Burnley Mechanics in 1855. The chapel is in the Italianate style, on a high basement with steps to deeply arched entrances on each side. The ground floor is rusticated, a device often used by Green. The upper floor has, at the centre, a tripartite pedimented window.

There were Baptists in Briercliffe by 1760, and they arrived in Burnley some years later. One of the most influential men in the early Baptist movement, Dan Taylor, came to Burnley in 1779. He travelled from where he was living in Hebden Bridge and preached, first in Worsthorne, and then in a house in Burnley Market Place, at that time situated at the bottom of what is now Manchester Road. His visits became regular, but he described the town as a “wretched place” with “no religion in or near it that we know of.” Taylor collected money from the Assembly of the General Baptists, held in London, for the building of a Burnley church, possibly the Ebenezer Chapel. It was from Ebenezer that, in 1850, pastor Rev T Batey and 64 members formed Aenon. Within three years there were almost 200 members. The chapel once had a day school. The name “Aenon” is from the Biblical place near Salem where John the Baptist was baptised by Jesus. The word, from the Greek, was originally derived from the Hebrew term “ay-yin” meaning “spring” or “natural fountain."

W. H. Allen, minister from 1871-5, addressed the people of Burnley people on the questions of wages and industrial relations. At a meeting in the church in 1891, the Baptist Movement achieved the creation of the Baptist Union of Great Britain and Ireland, by means of an agreement between the General Baptists and the Particular Baptists. The event has been described by Dr Underwood, historian of the Baptist Movement in England, as follows: "In 1891, the Association of the New Connexion met at Burnley ... and it was resolved by an overwhelming majority to accept the invitation offered. No confession of faith was asked for or given by either party. The two Missionary Societies and Building Funds were also amalgamated.." The union of the churches was a complete success, and the meeting can be regarded as one of the most important religious events to have taken place in Burnley.

In 1987 the church closed and moved elsewhere in the town. With the building vacant, however, Lancashire County Council missed the opportunity to extend the neighbouring Burnley Library into the premises. The building was later used as a nightclub. Proposals to use the building as an indoor market did not come to fruition, and a statue of Moses (a copy of the work by Michelangelo) was erected in front of it. In 2010, however, the building was saved by the local Primary Health Care Trust, with the intended use of providing much-needed dental services for the town. The statue of Moses was then removed.

=== Ebenezer ===
The Ebeneezer Chapel, on Colne Road, was founded in 1878. It has had a graveyard. Adjacent to the church is the chapel-like Ebenezer Schools.

=== Other Baptist ===
Immanuel Chapel, on Bright Street, was founded in 1895 and closed in 1970. The church did not have a graveyard. The building is now in commercial use.

The Mount Olivet Chapel, on Broughton Street/ Plover Street, was founded in 1893 but is now demolished. The church did not have a graveyard. The church started in 1884 as a mission in the High Street and in 1893, with the help of Aenon Chapel, established a chapel in Broughton Street. In 1936 it united with Immanuel Chapel. In 1988 Broughton Street Chapel closed and the church moved to Plover Street. The church published two Jubilee souvenirs – the first for 1884-1934 and the second for 1893-1943.

Mount Pleasant Chapel, on Hammerton Street, was founded in 1858 and closed in 1997. The church did not have a graveyard. In 1858 members of the Sion Chapel took a room in Keighley Green to form a new society, and in 1868 the chapel was bought from the United Methodists by the new Baptist Society. In 1997 it moved to Rosehill Road (see below). The church published a Jubilee souvenir for 1868-1968. The church did not have a graveyard.

The church at Healey Grange, Rosehill Road, was founded in 1997. The church does not have a graveyard.

== Particular Baptist ==
=== Jireh Chapel ===
Jireh Chapel, on Boot Way, was built in 1858 for the “Gadsbyites”, a Baptist sect found in this area. On 2 August 1995 the chapel was designated as a Grade I listed building by English Heritage. The chapel is of coursed rock-faced sandstone rubble and has a slate roof. It is a small single-storey rectangular building at right-angles to the street. It has a two-window gabled symmetrical facade, with a plinth and a pedimental gable. There is a tall central doorway with altered double doors and a plain overlight. The doorway has a plain surround with a moulded cornice on large fluted consoles, There is a rectangular plaque above the doorway inscribed: JIREH/ ERECTED A.D./ MDCCCLII. There are tall segmental-headed windows which have eared architraves. None of the glazing is original. The interior of the building is no longer accessible but is reported to be just a shell. The church does not have a graveyard.

=== Other churches ===
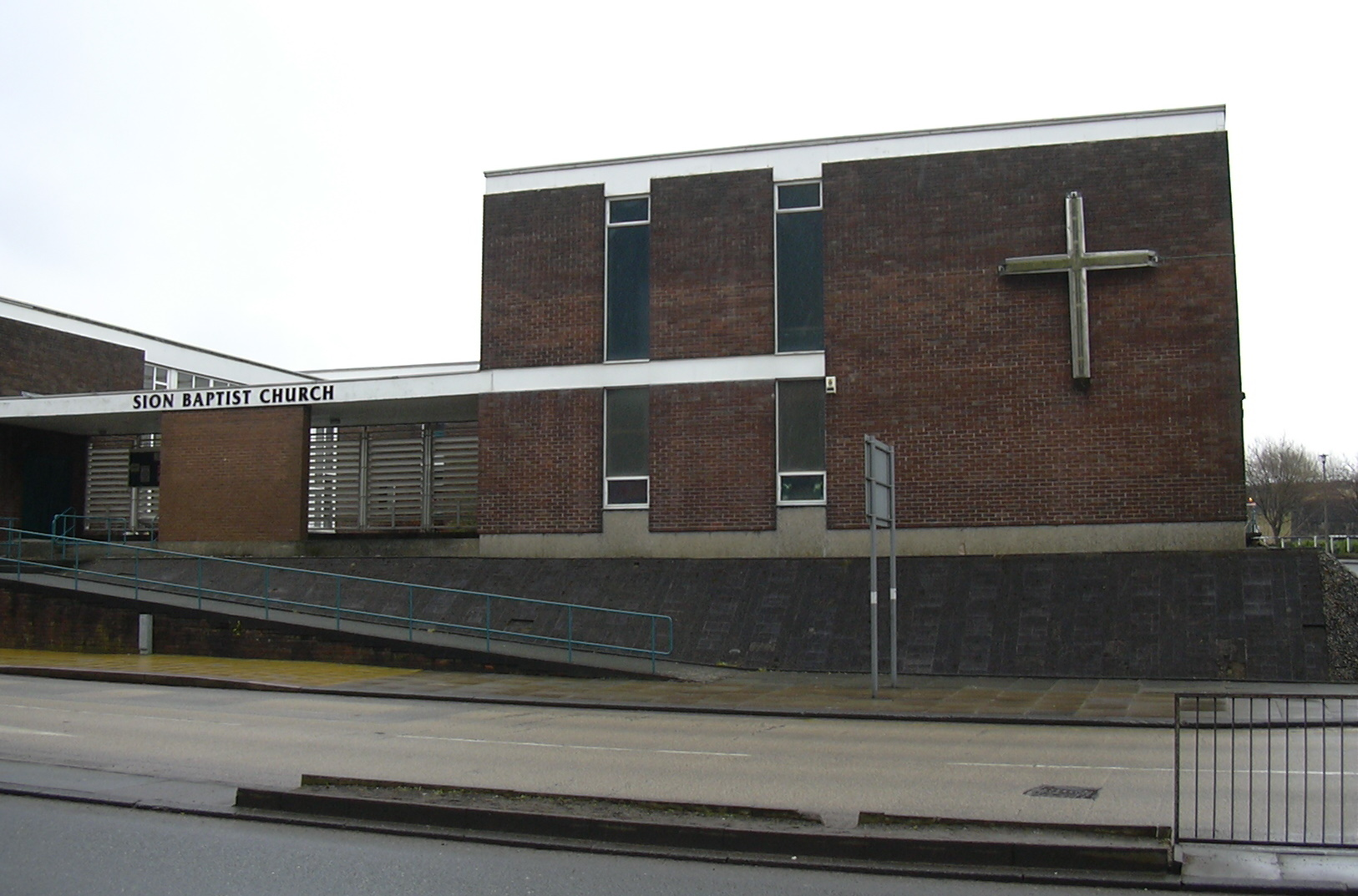
Sion Baptist Church on Church Street

Sion Baptist Chapel, on Church Road, began in 1827 as a school in Pickup Croft. In 1830 the first chapel, with a burial ground, was built in Yorkshire Street, but this was closed in the 1850s. In 1862 the chapel was rebuilt. In 1960 the church moved to new chapel in Church Street, and the old chapel was demolished to make way for a new road. The new chapel wall incorporates date stones from the old premises. It is unclear exactly when the Yorkshire Street church was closed.

== Methodist churches ==
Methodism appeared in Burnley before 1787, and the Central Methodist Church was founded in 1788 at Keighley Green. This church closed in 1840 when the congregation moved to Hargreaves Street. The old church there was used as a court and then as a Police Station until 1888, then as Burnley Labour Club. It was finally demolished in 1976. Today the Burnley Methodist Circuit consists of nine active churches in the town and the surrounding district - at Briercliffe Road, Brierfield, Brunshaw, Central, Greenbrook, Hapton, Padiham Road, Parkside and Wheatley Lane.

=== United Free Methodist churches ===
In 1907 the United Methodist Free Church merged with the Methodist New Connexion and the Bible Christians to form the United Methodist Church.

Claremont Street Chapel was founded in 1891 and closed in 1961. It did not have a graveyard. The premises was most recently used by Wright’s Upholstery Ltd as a three-piece suite showroom.

Salford Street Chapel was founded before 1895.

Brunswick Chapel, on Manchester Road, was founded in 1869 and closed in 1962. It did not have a graveyard. The chapel was demolished in 1963. “The History of Brunswick Chapel” has been written by J Atkin of the Burnley Historical Society.

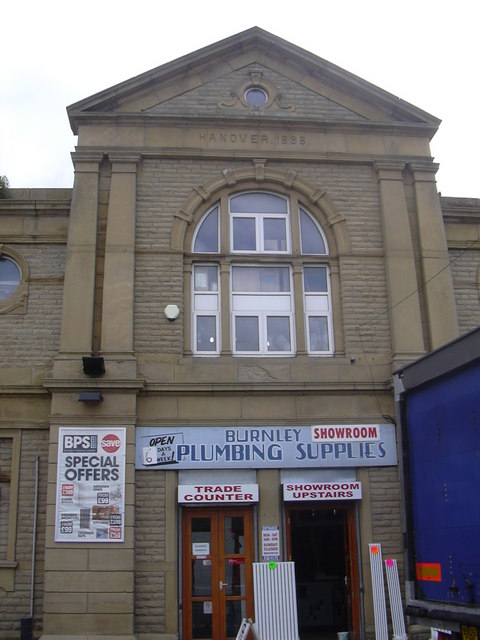
Hanover Chapel

Hanover Chapel, on Old Hall Street, was founded in 1878 and is now closed. The premises is now used by Burnley Plumbing Suppliers Ltd. The church did not have a graveyard.

Healy Wood Chapel, on Lincoln Street, was founded in 1883 and is now closed. The church did not have a graveyard.

Mount Pisgah Chapel on Myrtle Bank, Cog Lane (Stoops), was founded in 1834 and closed in 1971. It did not have a graveyard. It has now been replaced by Parkside Methodist church. Open-air services were held at Stoops from 1834, and a Protestant Wesleyan Methodist Mission was started by Rev W Ince. There were also missions at Salford Street and Hammerton Street. Three cottages were converted into a school and chapel by Stoops, and the church appeared in the Wesleyan Methodist Association Circuit Plan. By the 1851 census a Wesleyan Methodist church was recorded as having been built in 1838. In 1856 it became known as the United Methodist Free Church, and in 1884 a new church was opened. In 1971 it merged with Westhill Church on Accrington Road to become Parkside Methodist Church.

Mount Pleasant Chapel, on Hammerton Street, was founded in 1835 and closed in 1869. It did not have a graveyard. In 1834 the church was known as the “'Protestant Wesleyan Methodists” and was started by former members of Keighley Green Chapel who held meetings at Lanebridge and at Salford Mill. In 1856 it became known as “United Methodist Free Church” and in 1869 moved to new the Brunswick Chapel on Manchester Road.

=== Wesleyan Methodist churches ===
The Wesleyan Methodist Church formed in the 18th century suffered many secessions, but was the largest Nonconformist denomination in the 19th century. In 1932 the Wesleyan Methodists joined with the Primitive Methodists and the United Methodists to form the Methodist Church of Great Britain. In their 1911 History of the County of Lancaster: Volume 6, Farrer and Brownbill (eds) write: “The Wesleyans had chapels in Hargreaves Street (1840) and Stonyholme, and three others in Colne Road, &c. The Primitive Methodists built a chapel in Curzon Street in 1831, afterwards sold to the Wesleyan Reformers, and they have now two chapels in the northern part of the township—Mount Zion and Elim (1850), Burnley Lane. The Free Methodists had the chapel in Curzon Street, 1852; they have now three places of worship.”

Brooklands Road chapel was founded in 1883 and closed in 2002. It did not have a graveyard. The church originated in 1775 when services were held at Burnley Wood and occasionally in a house in Huffling Lane, then every Sunday at Burnley Wood Farm. In 1879 a mission started, and in 1883 a chapel opened on Brooklands Road, called Towneley Methodist Chapel. By 2002 the chapel had closed.

Lower Lane Chapel, or Lowerhouse Chapel, on Greenbrook Road, was founded before 1846. Methodism began at Lowerhouse in 1798 with a Sunday School in a cottage opposite Victoria Terrace. In 1837 a large room was built by the Dugdales of Ivy Bank. In 1876 it transferred to larger premises, and in 1898 a new school and chapel were erected. In 1984 the congregations of Lowerhouse and Rosegrove joined to form Greenbrook Methodists.

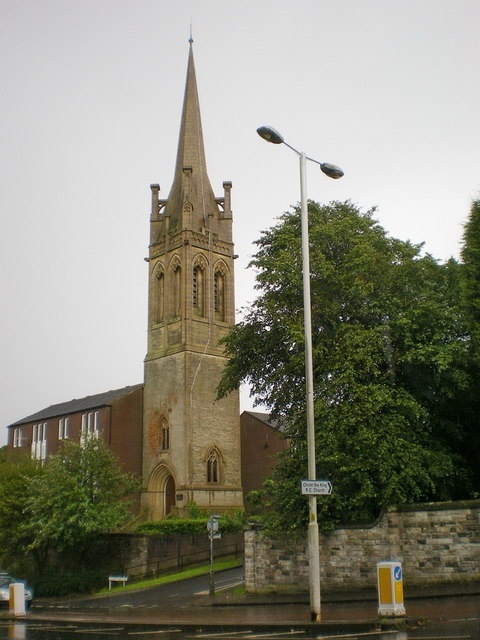
Church spire of the former Manchester Road Wesleyan Methodist Church

Manchester Road church was founded before 1893, although the main church opened in 1905. When the church was demolished, flats were built on the site, but the spire was preserved. A plaque remains dedicated to Thomas Cook J.P., “Who desired that this steeple be preserved as the landmark it is. A symbol of the former use of this site as a place of worship to God and the enduring craftsmanship of time past.”

Stoneyholme Chapel, on Hubie Street, founded in 1880, is now converted to a plumbing warehouse. In 1880 a mission opened in Regent Street/ Railway Street/ Canning Street, and in 1888 the chapel was opened. It is unclear when the church closed.

Whittlefield Chapel, on the High Street, was founded in 1873. The church originated in 1873 when a mission opened in the High Street over a blacksmith's shop. In 1878 the chapel opened. It is unclear when the chapel closed.

The New Central Methodist Church opened in 1967, when a new church was built on the site of the former Wesley Chapel in Hargreaves Street.

The Fulledge Chapel in Todmorden Road was founded in 1861 and closed in 1959. In 1889 the Hull Street Mission Room opened and a school was established. After the chapel closed in 1959, the building was used for other purposes. In 1985 it was gutted by fire, and in 1992 the ruined building was demolished.

Lane Bridge chapel, on Parker Lane, was founded in 1865 and closed before 1989. The church began as a Mission School in 1865. By 1868 there was a chapel in Fletcher Street, which later moved to Parker Lane. It is unclear when the chapel closed, but in 1989 the building was demolished.

The Queensgate Chapel, on Colne Road, was founded in 1909 and closed in 1968. It did not have a graveyard. It later became a Pentecostal church. It is now used as an Islamic centre (see below).

Rosegrove Methodist Chapel, on Gannow Lane, was founded in 1863 and closed in 1984. It did not have a graveyard. The church started as a school in a cottage called Bowker Fold. In 1867 a new cottage was adapted and in 1870 the school chapel opened. It was enlarged in 1883 and again in 1896. In 1902 a new chapel opened next to the former one. In 1937 the church absorbed the congregation from "Beulah" Primitive Methodist Chapel. When the chapel closed in 1984, the congregation joined Lowerhouse (see above). The church was eventually demolished following fire damage.

The Rosehill Mission, on Robert's Row, was founded before 1873. It did not have a graveyard. The mission opened in 1871 and the school opened in 1878.

Wood Top Chapel, on Florence Street, was founded in 1878. It is now closed and has been demolished, but its date of closure is unclear. A mission was started in 1878 and in 1891 the chapel opened.

Park Hill Chapel, on Padiham Road, was founded in 1826 and closed in 1952. In 1826 the first meeting place was over a shop and warehouse. In 1843 the chapel opened and was in the Burnley circuit. In 1876 there were considerable alterations, and in 1896 and in 1898 there were further structural changes.

Accrington Road church was founded in 1849 at Bartle Hills, but the chapel there became too small, and so in 1871 the congregation moved to a new church on Accrington Road. In 1961 the name of the chapel changed to “Westhill” when the church at Howard Street closed and joined. In 1967 the chapel closed because of dry rot, and the schoolroom was used as a chapel for a time. The church finally closed completely in 1971 when the congregation joined the Mount Pisgah Chapel at Myrtle Bank, Cog Lane. The church did not have a graveyard.

=== Primitive Methodist churches ===
Curzon Street Chapel was founded in 1822 in the Blackburn branch of the Hull Circuit. In 1823 it was placed into Clitheroe branch of Silsden Circuit. In 1824 the Clitheroe Circuit was formed and in 1829 the Burnley Circuit. The chapel was built in 1833 and opened in 1834. The Baptismal Register of 1835–1837 shows that whole families were baptised at the same time. In 1852 the Bethel Chapel in Hammerton Street opened.

Bethel Chapel, on Hammerton Street, opened in 1852. In 1932 it closed and the building was sold to the Christian Science Church. The church did not have a graveyard.

Howard Street Chapel was founded in 1895 and closed in 1961, when it combined with Accrington Road Wesleyan Methodists and became known as Westhill Methodists. The building is now in commercial use.

Beulah Chapel, in Rosegrove, opened before 1902 and closed in 1937. The church did not have a graveyard. The church began with the formation, in 1899, by Mr and Mrs Thornborrow of the church on Roebuck Street, Gannow Top of a new society, which had meetings in their kitchen. The meetings later moved to a wooden shanty in Lowerhouse Lane. In 1905 the chapel opened. When it closed in 1937, the congregation joined with Rosegrove Wesleyan Methodists. The building is now used as a library.

Jubilee Church, at Gannow Top, Padiham Road is claimed, by one source, to have been founded in 1903. It does not have a graveyard. The church is also said to have opened in 1902, built to replace the Zion Chapel at Gannow Top. In 1961 it took in the congregation from Claremont Chapel. In 1994 it re-opened after major building alterations.

Mount Zion chapel, on Colne Road, opened in 1847 and closed in 1938. The church began as a mission at Rake Head which opened in 1847. In 1850 a small school and chapel opened in Briercliffe Road, and this was recorded in the 1851 Census. In 1877 a new chapel was erected in Colne Road, between Rylands Street and Ford Street. It is unclear when the building was demolished, but it was before then in secular use.

The Rehoboth Chapel, on Springfield Road (formerly Waterloo Road), was founded in 1863. It is unclear when it was closed and when it was demolished. It did not have a graveyard. The chapel started as a mission in a cottage in Springfield Road in 1863 and then in a mill. In 1869 the chapel opened, and in 1881 Rehoboth Sunday School opened on Springfield Road. The Sunday School building was being used as a children's nursery in 1997.

Zion Chapel, on Roebuck Street, was founded in 1878. It is now closed and has been demolished, but its date of closure is unclear. The first meetings were held in a cottage in Thompson Street, and in 1869 the chapel opened. In 1884 the church re-opened, and in 1897 there were plans to build a new church.

Briercliffe Road church held its first services at Reedley Lodge, but in 1867 a small chapel was built at Lane Head. This was replaced in 1895 by the new “Elim Chapel” on Briercliffe Road, at the corner of Melville Street. In 1996 the chapel closed and amalgamated with the congregation of Colne Road Methodist Church. In 1999 Elim Chapel was demolished, with plans to build a new church here and then to sell the Colne Road Church building. In 2001 the new chapel, called United Methodist Church, opened. The church does not have a graveyard.

=== Independent Methodist ===
Robinson Street Chapel was founded in 1891. It did not have a graveyard. The chapel evolved from an earlier one in Calder Street. There is a date stone on the building commemorating its construction in 1891. It closed in about 1980 but was still standing in 1997, when it was being used as a storeplace.

== Congregational churches ==
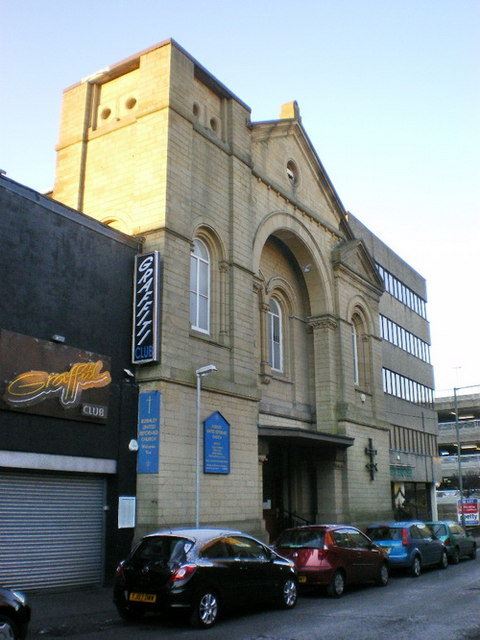
Burnley URC

The Congregationalists established Bethesda Chapel at Goodham Hill in 1814. A secession from this congregation resulted in the Salem Chapel in 1851, and a third secession produced another chapel. The Bethesda Chapel was rebuilt in 1881. It is now the United Reformed Church.

Owen Street Church, in Rosegrove, was founded in 1900. It did not have a graveyard.

Thursby Road Mission Hall, on Heasandford Road, was founded 1911 and closed in 1950.

Westgate Chapel, in West Gate, was founded 1859 and closed in 1972. In 1973 it was damaged by fire. It has now been demolished and the site built on.

Burnley Wood Chapel, on Hollingreave Road, was founded 1890 and closed in 1979. The mission began in 1889 and in 1896 the chapel was built.

Salem Chapel, on Manchester Road, was founded in 1849. The site is now occupied by Endsleigh Insurance. In 2006 the new minister at Salem Chapel, Martin Top, was Pastor David Gwyn Isaacs.

== Other non-conformist ==
=== Unitarian ===
The Trafalgar Street church was founded in 1858 and closed in 1960. An illustration survives of the church built in 1871. In 1894 the interior was re-modelled, and the space in front of the church was filled up with a block of schoolrooms and a meetings hall. In 1858 a room was taken in Thomas Street by an offshoot of the Nazareth Unitarian Chapel in Padiham, and the following year a mission opened at Tanner Street. In 1870 the church moved to Trafalgar Street Chapel. It is unclear when the chapel was closed or when it was demolished.

=== Scottish Baptist ===
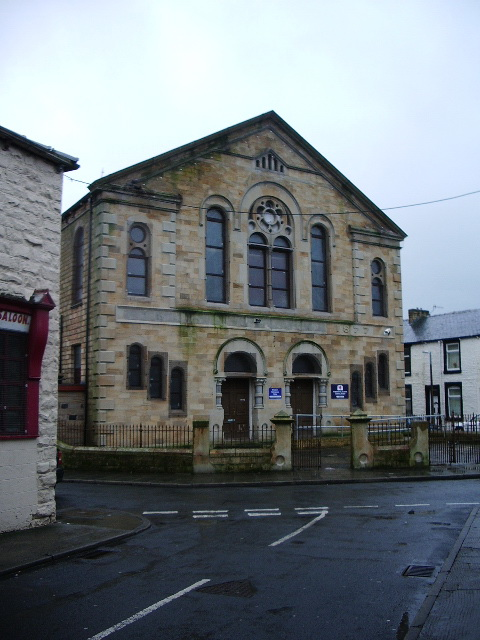
Angle Street Baptist

The Bethel Scottish Baptist chapel on Angle Street, was founded in 1867 and closed in 1968. The building is now in use as a Muslim school.

=== Life Church ===
Life Church is a non-denominational Church on Sycamore Avenue. The Church can trace its history back to 1911. In 1921 the believers were recognised as "The Pentecostal Church" and held congregation in rented buildings, until the purchase of their first building on Thursby Road in 1949. They stayed at this location for 21 years until the congregation grew too large and were forced to purchase a larger venue. In 1970 the church purchased the former Colne Road Methodist Church and renamed themselves and the building to "Queensgate Pentecostal Church". The congregation stayed at this location until 2005, when they purchased Gannow Baths on Sycamore Avenue, a closed down, government owned public leisure centre and surrounding fields. Gannow Baths was renovated to serve as a temporary place of worship for the congregation whilst work began to build a purpose built, 500 seater auditorium on the adjoining fields of their current venue. The building on Colne Road was subsequently sold and converted into a Mosque. Construction of their purpose built church began in 2008 however soon after work began both construction developers were forced into bankruptcy, ultimately delaying the building of their new church. In 2014, the new building was completed and officially opened.

=== New Church ===
The New Church, previously New Jerusalem Church, is a Swedenborgian church on Briercliffe Road. In 1814 the church was established in Burnley and in 1849 was located at Coke Street, where it was still to be found for the 1851 census. The society failed in 1857 and was re-established ten years later in a tinsmith shop on Finsley Gate. It failed again in 1873 but was restarted in 1885 by people from Embsay who had moved to the area. In 1887 the New Jerusalem Church was built, and in 1906 another new church was built in Briercliffe Road. In 1990 a new church was built next to the previous site. The church has published a Jubilee souvenir for the period 1885-1935 as well as A History of the New Church, written by Anne Brigg, in 1946. The church does not have a graveyard.

=== Christian Science ===
In 1932 the Bethel Chapel in Hammerton Street was bought from the Methodists. By 1979 the church had relocated to premises in Calder Street, formerly the Pack Horse Inn. The premises was for as time a Christian Science Reading Room, but is now “Burnley Concert Artists” Working Men’s Club. .

=== Salvation Army ===
The Salvation Army has a citadel on Richard Street. There is also a former Salvation Army Hall, on Elmwood Road, which may now be in industrial use.

=== Jehovah’s Witness ===
The Kingdom Hall of Jehovah’s Witnesses, on Morse Street, was established before 1966. In 1994 a new hall was built on the site of the old one.

=== Spiritualist ===
There is a Spiritualist Church on Stanley Road. The church first opened in 1906 on North Road. It later moved to Hammerton Street and then to Stanley Street. The church has services on Sunday afternoons and Tuesday evenings.

=== LDS Church ===
The Church of Jesus Christ of Latter-day Saints (LDS) church began to meet, in 1902, at Victoria Street. In 1964 they were at Liverpool Road and in 1969 moved to Belvedere Road.

== Synagogues ==
Only one Jewish congregation, the Burnley Synagogue, is known to have existed in the town. The beginnings of Jewish worship can be traced back at least as far as 1894, when a room, especially furnished to act as a synagogue, was made available by dentist N. S. Bernstein. A synagogue proper, at 20 Sandy Gate, was consecrated on 25 August 1895, reputedly the private property of S. Shabbatt, then vice-president. The congregation was formally established in 1906. By 1931, however, only four Jewish families remained in the town, and the synagogue closed in about 1934.

== Mosques ==
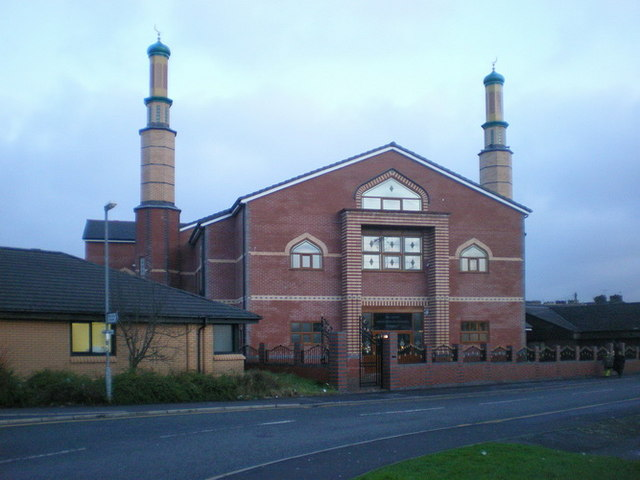
Jamia Masjid Ghausia Mosque, Abel Street

October 2009 saw the official opening of Burnley's first purpose-built mosque. The £1.5M privately funded Jamia Masjid Ghausia Mosque on Abel Street in Daneshouse, was the culmination of ten years of fundraising in the local and wider Muslim communities.

There are ten mosques in Burnley:

- Jamia Masjid Abu Bakr on Brougham Street
- Anjaman-e-Muhibban-e-Ahel-e-Bait Hussainia Mosque on Grey Street
- Jamia Masjid-e-Farooq-e-Azam Mosque on North Street, Duke Bar
- Merkazie Jamia Mosque Ghosia on Colne Road, Duke Bar
- Dar-ul-islah Wattabari masjid on Colne Road, Duke Bar
- UK Islamic Mission - Masjid-e-Ibrahim on Elm Street and Clegg Street
- Masjid Ali Murtaza on Talbot Street
- Shah Jalal Masjid & Madrassa on Burns Street
- Dar-ul-Alum on Leyland Road
- The Queensgate Islamic Centre on Colne Road, Reedley, was previously a Pentecostal church, and originally was the Queensgate Wesleyan Methodist Church which closed 1968 (see above)

== Gallery ==
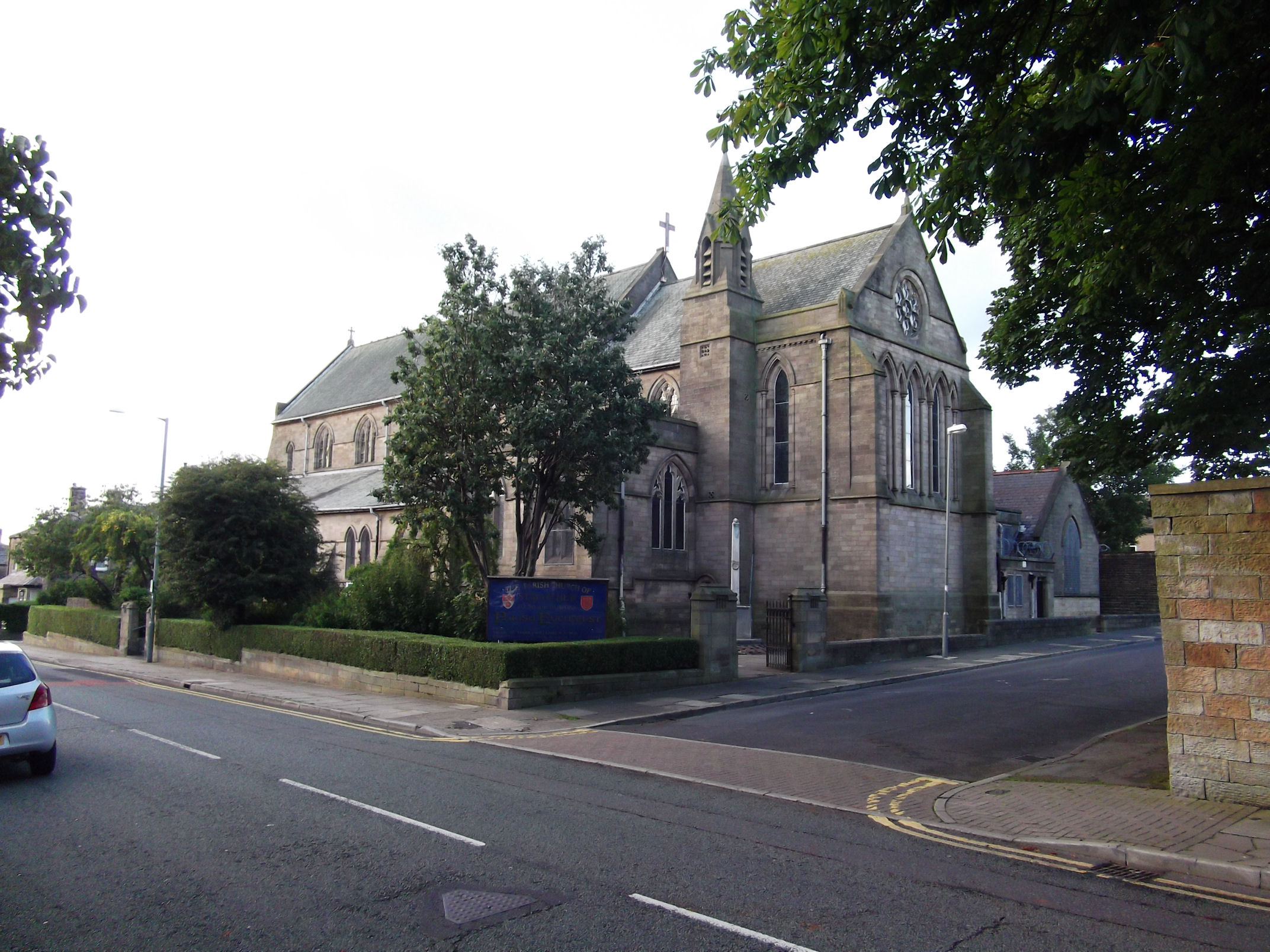
St Matthew’s Anglican

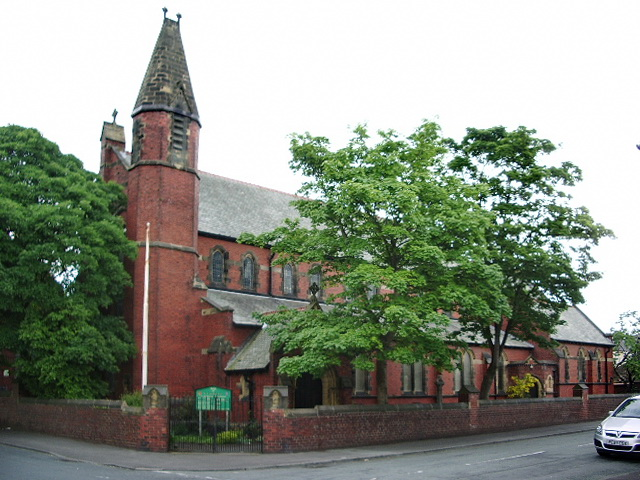
St Cuthbert’s Anglican

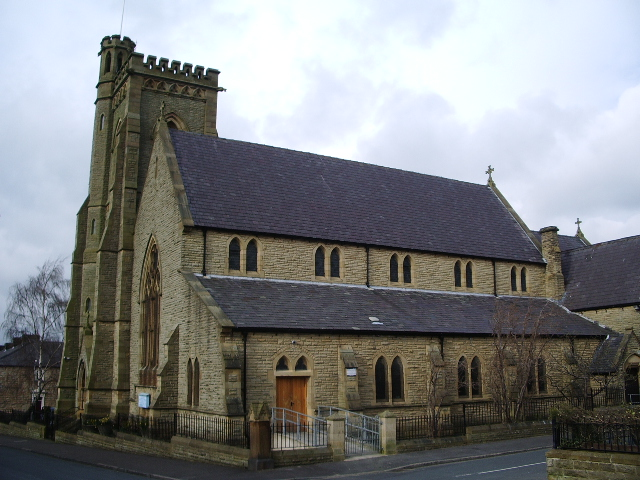
St Stephen’s Anglican

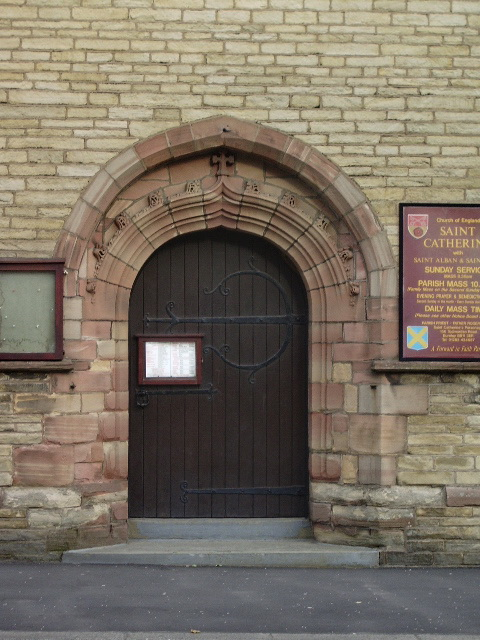
St Catherine’s Anglican (doorway)

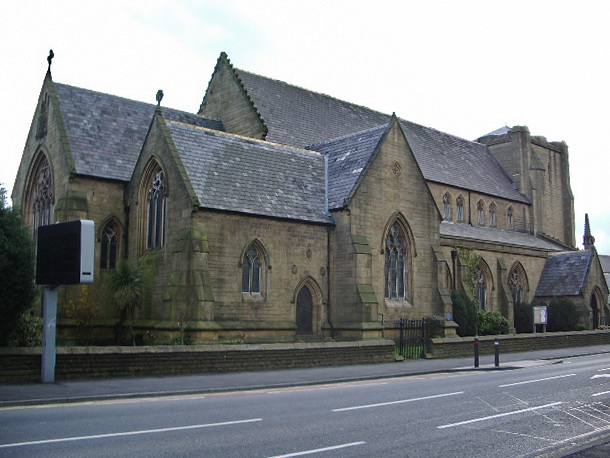
St Mary of the Assumption Catholic

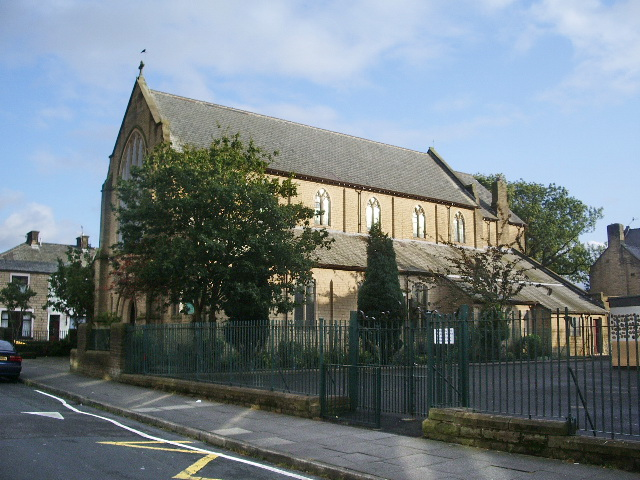
St John the Baptist‘s Catholic

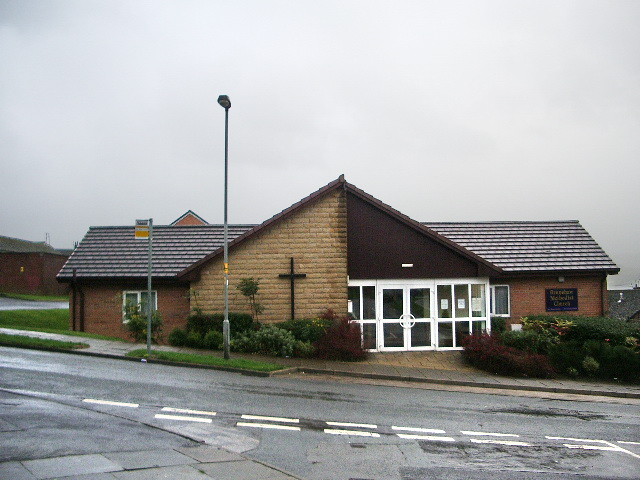
Brunshaw Methodist

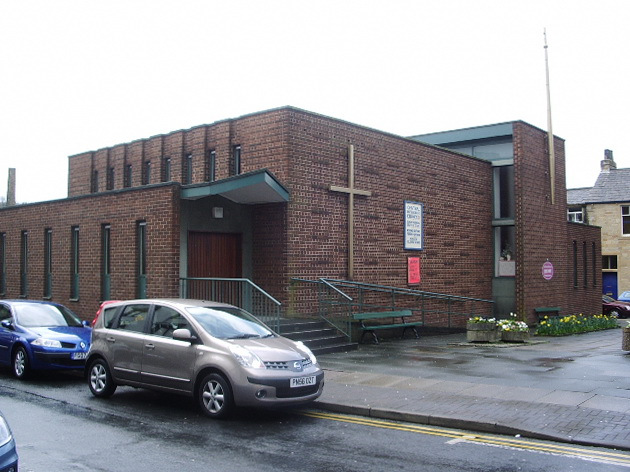
Central Methodist Church

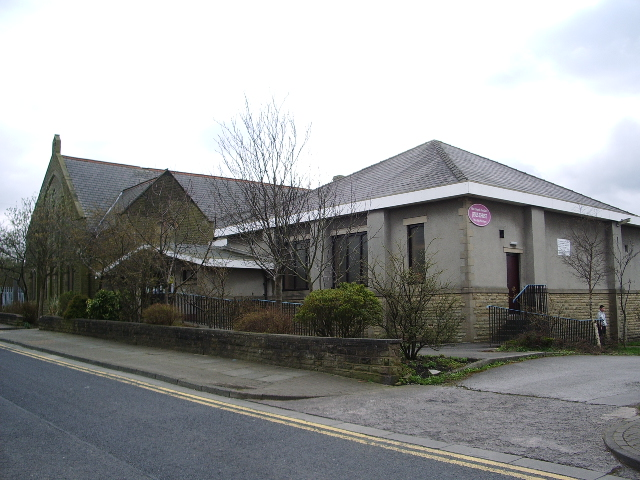
Greenbrook Methodist

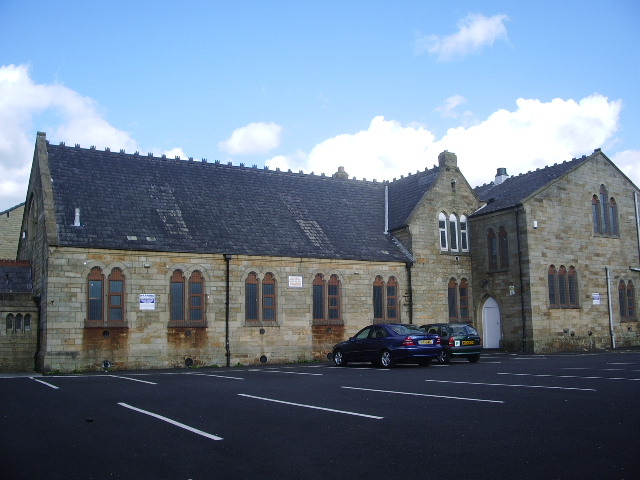
Colne Road Church

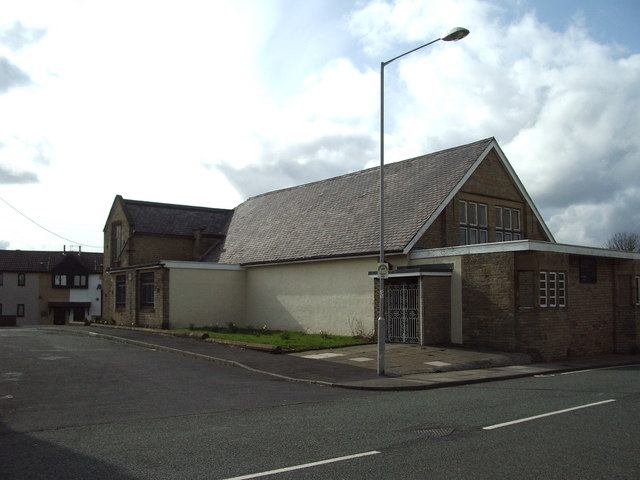
Parkside Methodist

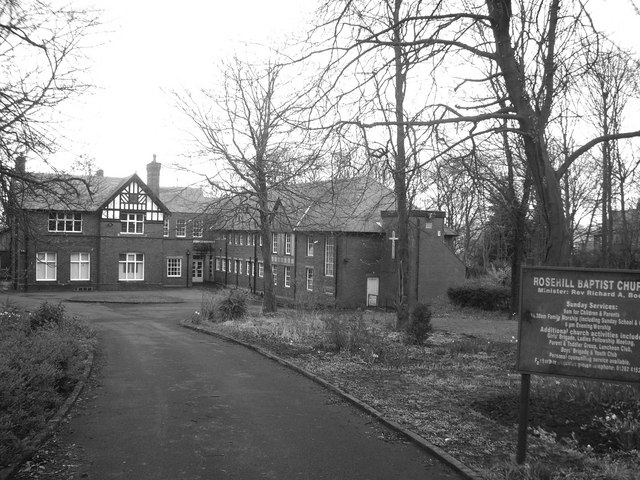
Rosehill Baptist

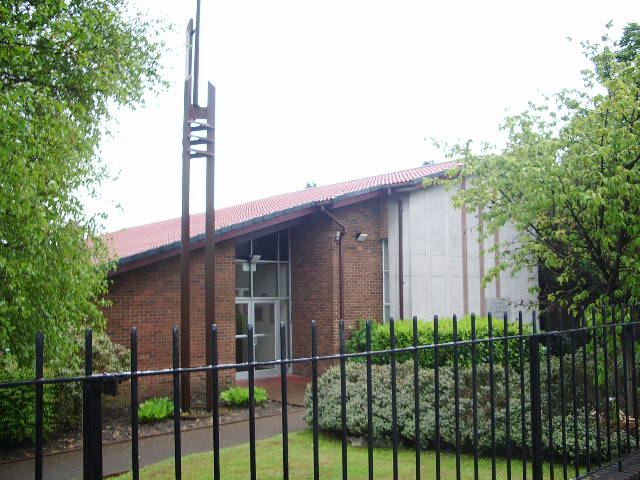
The Church of Jesus Christ of Latter-day Saints

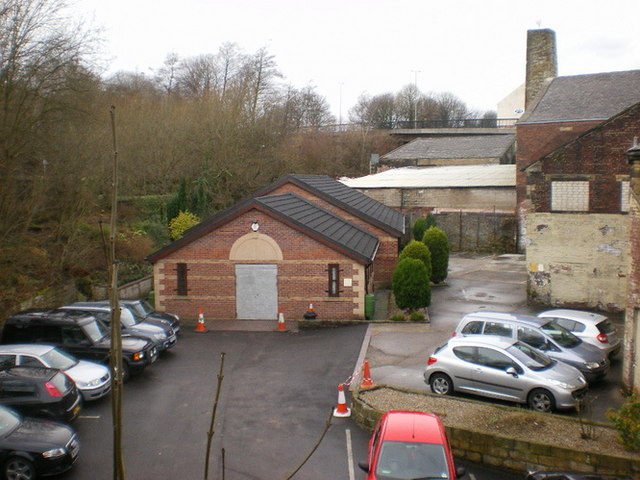
Burnley Spiritualist Church

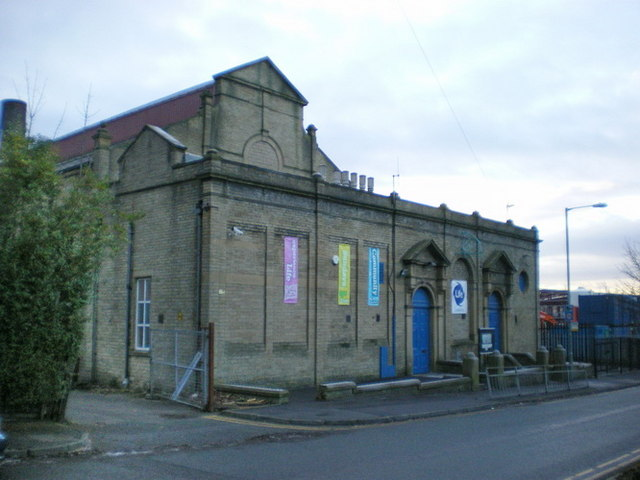
Former Life Church (new building is adjacent)

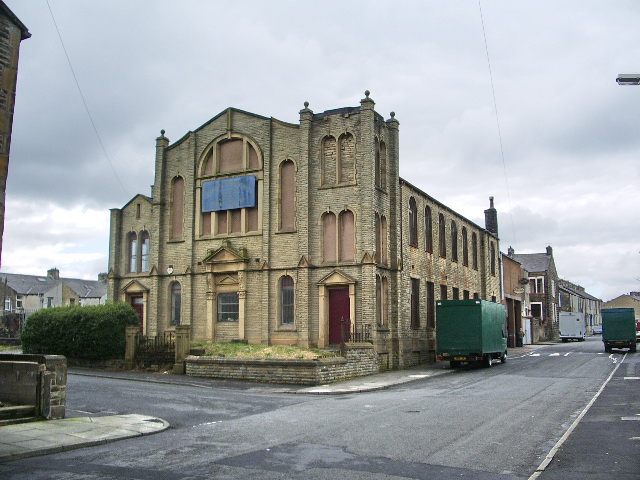
Former Claremont Street Methodist

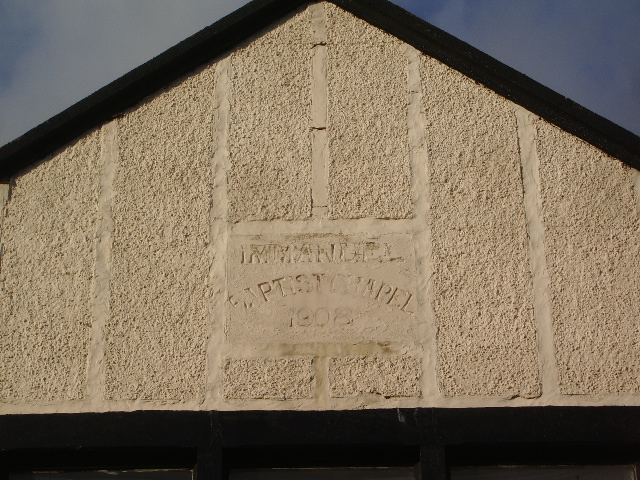
Foundation stone at Immanuel Baptist
